= Coors strike and boycott =

20th-century labor action against Coors Brewing Company

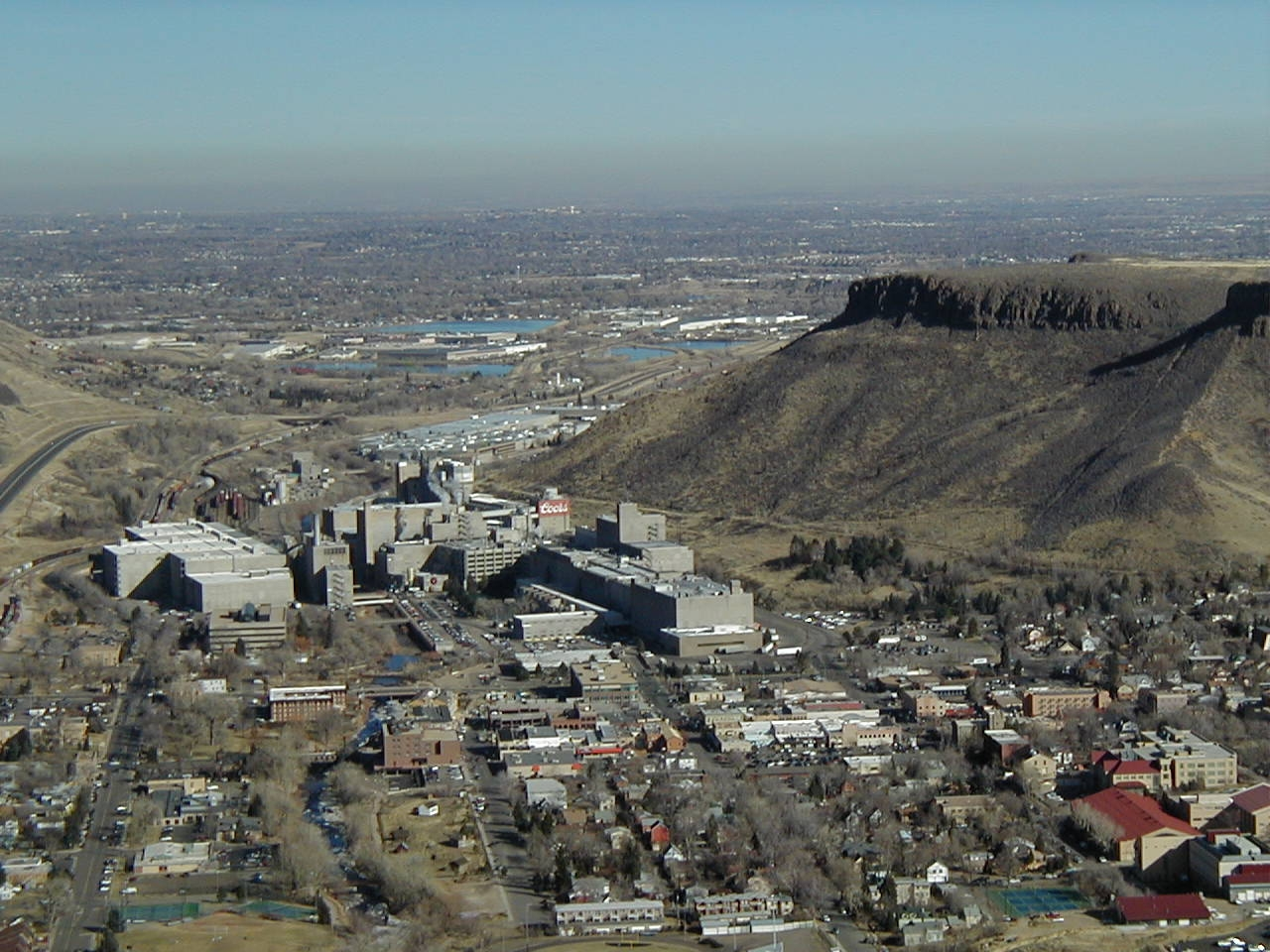
Cityscape of Golden, Colorado, home of the Coors Brewing Company

The Coors strike and boycott was a series of boycotts and strike action against the Coors Brewing Company, based in Golden, Colorado, United States. Initially local, the boycott started in the late 1960s and continued through the 1970s, coinciding with a labor strike at the company's brewery in 1977. The strike ended the following year in failure for the union, which Coors forced to dissolve. The boycott, however, lasted until the mid-1980s, when it was more or less ended.

The boycott began in 1966 as a regional affair coordinated by the Colorado chapter of the American GI Forum and the Denver-based Crusade for Justice. These two Hispanic groups initiated a boycott due to the Coors Brewing Company's discriminatory practices that targeted Hispanics and African Americans. Additionally, they opposed the Coors family's support of right wing political causes. Soon afterward, the boycott expanded through much of the American West. By the 1970s, the boycott covered much of Coors' market area and involved Hispanic, African American, and women's rights groups, as well as labor unions and LGBT activists. The latter group opposed Coors' practice of using a polygraph test during their hiring process, which they alleged allowed them to discriminate against LGBT individuals. In San Francisco, the city's LGBT community and the Teamsters union allied to promote the boycott that involved noted gay rights activists Harvey Milk and Cleve Jones.

In April 1977, members of Brewery Workers Local 366, which represented over 1,500 workers at the company's flagship Golden, Colorado brewery, went on strike over noneconomic issues related to, among other things, the company's use of polygraph testing and their 21 grounds for dismissal. Shortly after the strike started, the AFL-CIO (the United States' largest federation of labor unions) initiated a nationwide boycott of Coors. The strike lasted for over 20 months, during which time a majority of the union members went back to work without a contract after the company began replacing strikers with strikebreakers. The company initiated a vote the following year over whether the local union would be dissolved, with a majority of workers voting to dissolve Brewery Workers Local 366. Despite this, the AFL–CIO continued their boycott. By the 1980s, Coors began making deals with several minority groups to do more business with minority companies and hire more minority workers. Despite this, the boycott continued and expanded to include numerous other groups, such as the National Organization for Women and the National Education Association. However, in August 1987, the AFL–CIO agreed to end the boycott, with Coors making several concessions that included using union labor to build a new facility in Virginia and an agreement to an expedited union vote at its Golden facility. In December 1988, workers at the Golden brewery voted against unionizing by a margin of over 2 to 1.

The strike and boycott had a direct economic impact on Coors. The company's market share in several western states dropped from over 40 percent to as low as 17 percent in the case of California. Additionally, the boycott may have encouraged the company to expand nationally, as the company expanded its presence from 11 states in 1975 to 49 states by 1988. In the LGBT community, the boycott left a lasting impact, as several groups and activists still object to Coors over the company's past actions and the family's continued support of conservative politics. As late as 2019, Coors beer was difficult to find in any gay bar in San Francisco.

== Background ==
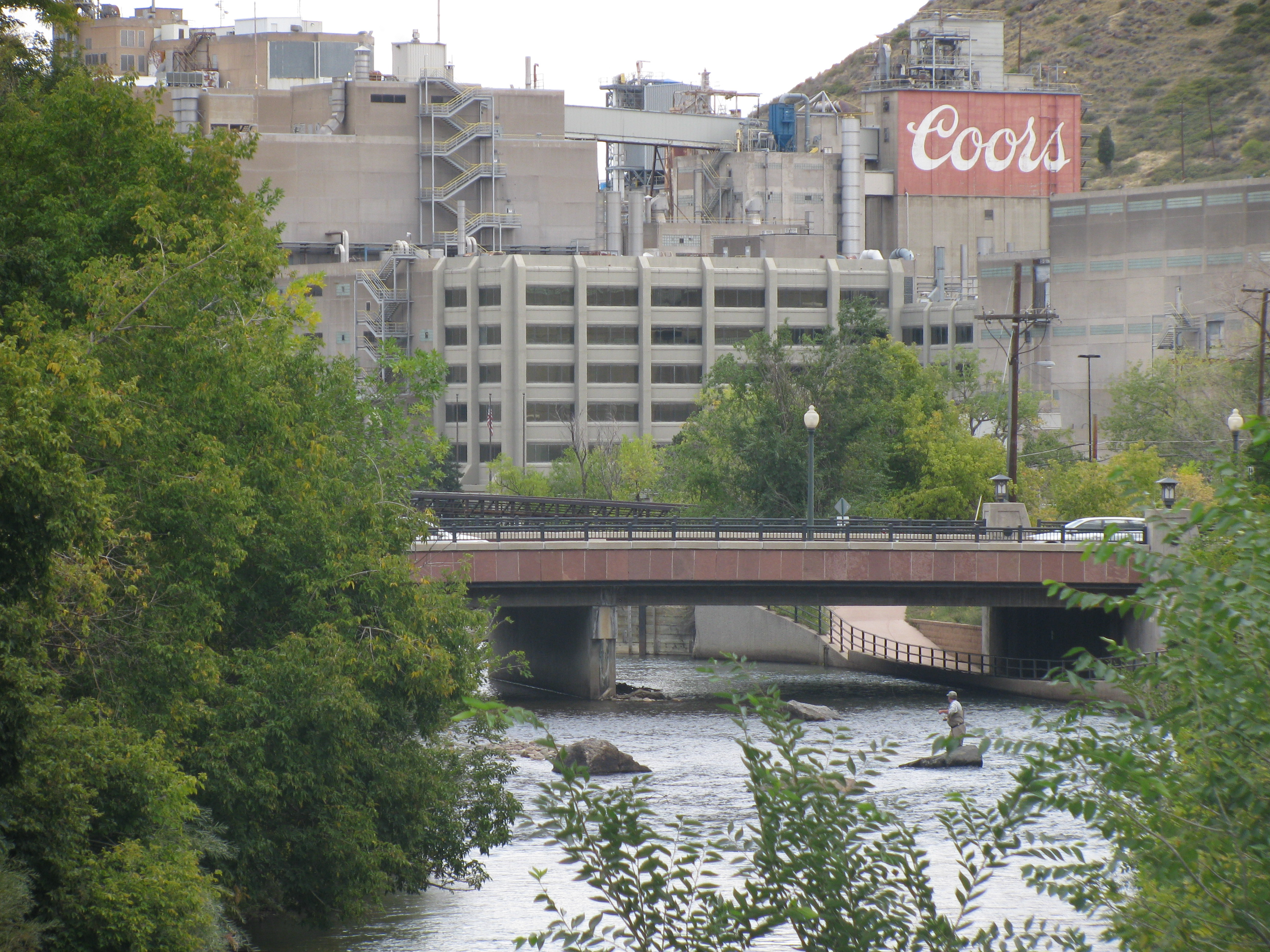
The Coors brewery along the Clear Creek

=== Coors and organized labor ===
The Coors Brewing Company is a Colorado-based brewing company that was founded in 1873 by German American Adolph Coors. By 1975, it had grown to become the fourth-largest brewing company in the United States, and its brewery in Golden, Colorado was the single largest brewing facility in the world. That year, the company did approximately $440 million in sales. Its product was notable at the time for being one of the few beers created in the United States not to be pasteurized, which required the beer to be constantly refrigerated to prevent going stale. The company was also notable for only selling its products in 11 states in the American West, as opposed to the national distribution of its main competitors: Anheuser-Busch, the Joseph Schlitz Brewing Company, and the Pabst Brewing Company. This limited market area led to considerable bootlegging of the product to the eastern United States. Organized labor activities at the brewery began in the 1930s, (Note: A 1978 report by the Associated Press claimed that the company had had a union presence for 42 years at that time, since 1936 when union representation began. However, a 1979 article in The Washington Post claimed that a union had been invited to organize at the brewery 45 years prior, giving the year of 1934.) when Adolph Coors II (who had succeeded his father as chief of the company) invited a labor union to organize at the location. However, in the following decades, the company had a troubled relationship with organized labor, with the AFL–CIO claiming that the company had destroyed 19 different unions at their facilities, including local unions representing boilermakers, electricians, and ironworkers, among other groups.

=== The Coors family and social issues ===
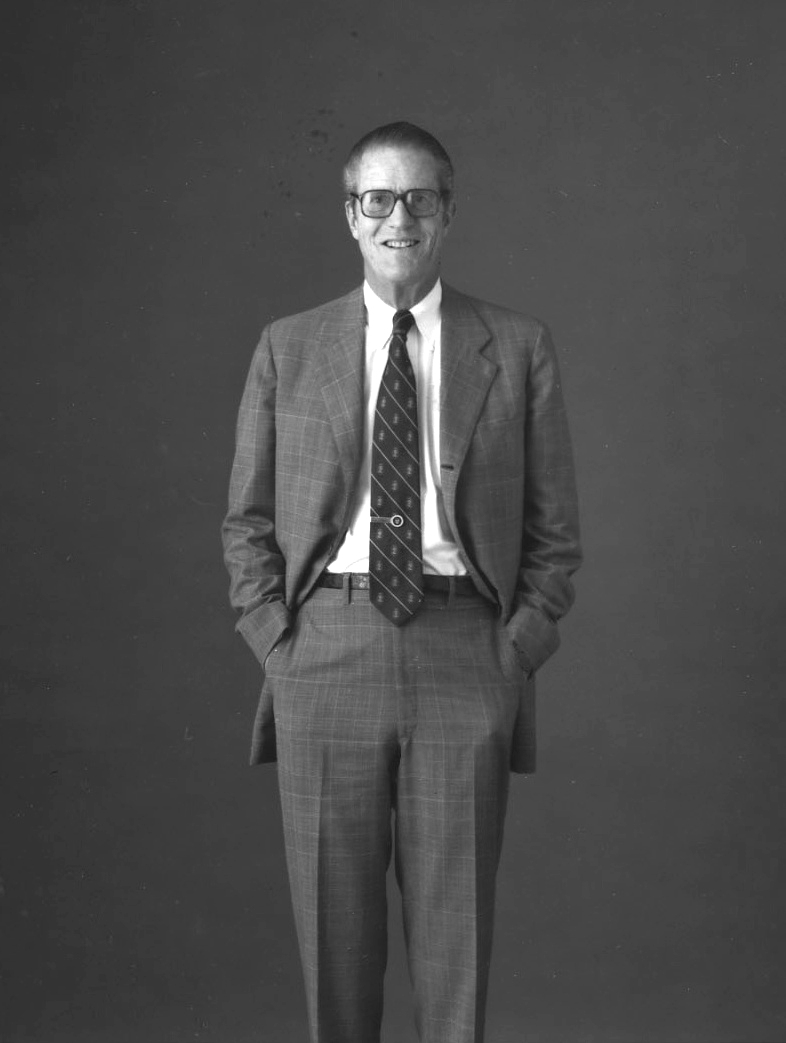
Executive Vice President Joseph Coors

By 1975, several members of the Coors family held leadership positions in the company, including Executive Vice President Joseph Coors and Chairman of the Board William Coors, both grandsons of Adolph's. The family was well known for their support of conservative political causes, with Joseph in particular described by The New York Times as an "ultraconservative zealot". During the late 1960s to early 1970s, Joseph served as a member of the Regents of the University of Colorado, during which time he took a hardline stance against student activism. He also opposed the creation of a chapter of the United Mexican American Students on campus, as well as the creation of courses regarding Chicana/o studies. Contemporary regents, from both the Democratic and Republican Parties, criticized Coors' actions as regent. In 1974, he was nominated by U.S. President Richard Nixon to the board of directors for the Corporation for Public Broadcasting. However, his nomination was later killed by the U.S. Senate Commerce Committee, which expressed concerns over potential conflicts of interest after it was revealed that he had donated money to the John Birch Society. Joseph later donated money towards Ronald Reagan's 1976 presidential campaign, and he additionally provided grants and funding to conservatives groups including The Heritage Foundation, the Free Congress Foundation, and the National Right to Work Committee.

== Boycott begins ==
=== Hispanic and African American groups ===
Starting in 1966, the Colorado chapter of the Hispanic veterans' organization American GI Forum, along with the Denver-based group Crusade for Justice, initiated a boycott against Coors due to the company's discrimination against Mexican Americans. Specifically, they cited the fact that Hispanic workers constituted only a small fraction of the total employees at Coors, with only 27 of the 1,330 employees in 1968 being Mexican Americans (approximately 2 percent of Coors' total workforce, compared to 15-20% of the population statewide). Additionally, many of the jobs held by Hispanic employees at Coors were menial labor positions. Women also constituted a very small portion of Coors' workforce, with only 56 women (44 of whom were white) working for the company in 1967. In August 1970, the Colorado Civil Rights Commission found the company guilty of firing a worker due to his race. The commission ultimately ruled against the company on two separate occasions in the early 1970s for discriminating against African American workers. A September 1975 complaint filed by the Equal Employment Opportunity Commission (EEOC) alleged that almost all of the African Americans and Mexican Americans at Coors worked in unskilled or semiskilled positions and that almost all of the women were employed in either office or service positions, or as clerical workers. That month, the EEOC filed a lawsuit against the company with the United States District Court for the District of Colorado, with the company settling out of court in 1977.

In addition to employment discrimination, Hispanic activists also singled out Joseph Coors' actions while university regent and the Coors family's response to the Delano grape strike. During the strike and associated boycott, which had been organized by the United Farm Workers, the Coors family supported non-union grape growers, and the Crusade for Justice's newspaper El Gallo published images reportedly showing Coors trucks being used to transport grapes harvested by non-union farmers to markets. In 1969, 43 students at Southern Colorado State College protested Coors by blocking people at a local pub from ordering Coors beer. 15 of the students were arrested, and the college later filed a restraining order against the protestors. The same year, the boycott grew nationwide, with the national chapter of the American GI Forum instituting a boycott against Coors. This action was supported by several other national organizations representing Hispanics and Mexican Americans, including the Mexican American Youth Organization and the Raza Unida Party. Representatives from the American GI Forum had several meetings with William Coors during this time to address the issues they were protesting, but the discussions proved fruitless.

=== Polygraph testing and LGBT response ===
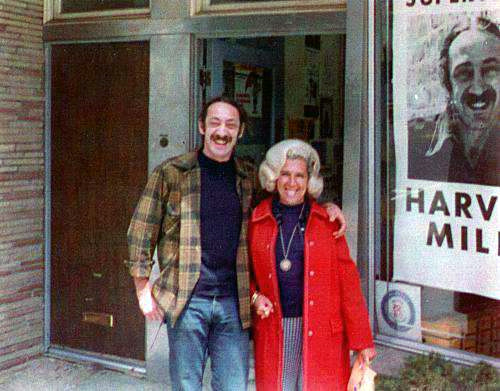
Activist Harvey Milk (left) helped coordinate an alliance between San Francisco's gay community and labor unions to boycott Coors.

Another point of contention between the company and protestors involved the use of polygraph tests on job applicants, a process that the company had implemented following the 1960 kidnapping and murder of Adolph Coors III. These tests, conducted during the applicant's background check, were a significant point of contention among union members at the company, with the union alleging that the questions asked violated privacy and led to discrimination. Questions asked during the testing covered topics including the use of marijuana, personal debts the individual owed, political affiliations of the application (specifically regarding "subversive, revolutionary or communist activities"), and a question that read, "Is there anything in your personal life that might tend to discredit or embarrass this company if it were known?" Multiple sources also reported that applicants were asked about their sexual orientation. While critics of the testing alleged that the company used the information collected to prevent people from being hired based on political affiliations or sexuality, the company denied this. According to William Coors, approximately 45 percent of applicants failed the polygraph testing, primarily with regards to questions over drug use.

Despite the company's claims, Coors became known throughout the LGBT community for its homophobic practices, and by 1973, the boycott had expanded to include members of that community. The LGBT community also began to forge an alliance against Coors with local unions, who resented the company's anti-unionism. Around this time, president Allan Baird of Teamsters Local 921, which had organized Coors distribution workers in San Francisco, worked with activist Howard Wallace (an openly gay truck driver and Teamsters member) to organize a large-scale boycott in the Bay Area, leading to numerous gay bars refusing to carry Coors products. Gay rights activist Scott Smith was also involved in the boycott and brought it to the attention of Harvey Milk, a noted gay activist and politician, who met with Baird in 1973 and helped coordinate the boycott, strengthening the alliance between the traditionally conservative Teamsters union and the area's gay community. Through Milk, the boycott spread throughout the Castro District, the city's gay neighborhood. Milk also encouraged the Teamsters to hire openly gay people and to oppose the Briggs Amendment, a California ballot measure that would have banned LGBT teachers from employment. Activist Cleve Jones was also involved, and he later claimed that the Bay Area boycott was the first-ever instance of collaboration between labor unions and the gay rights movement. Activist Tami Gold later claimed that the boycott was "perhaps one of the first major public demonstrations of the links between class and sexual identity".

== Strike action ==
1977–1978 Coors strike
- Date: April 5, 1977 – December 14, 1978 (Note: End date represents the date that brewery workers voted to decertify the local union.) (1 year, 8 months, 1 week and 2 days)
- Location: Golden, Colorado, United States
- Caused by: Disagreements over content of new labor contract
- Goals: Change in grounds for dismissal; End to polygraph testing
- Methods: Strike action; Picketing; Walkout
- Result: Strikebreakers and union members hired without labor contracts; Workers vote to decertify local union

Parties
Brewery Workers Local 366	Coors Brewing Company

During the boycott, brewery workers at Coors had union representation as members of the Brewery Workers Local 366, which had existed at the plant since at least a failed strike in 1957. A 1975 article in The New York Times described the unions at Coors as weak, highlighting several failed strikes that had occurred throughout the company's history. At the time, union members reported that working conditions were not ideal, with the most significant point of contention being the 21 causes for firing, which included doing anything "which would discourage any person from drinking Coors beer" and "making disparaging remarks about the employer". While the union's president claimed that the labor contract was "pretty lousy", he admitted that the pay and benefits offered by the company were better than most in the industry, and that "[a]s long as they're getting a high wage rate and aren't faced with disciplinary action, their contract doesn't mean much to them".

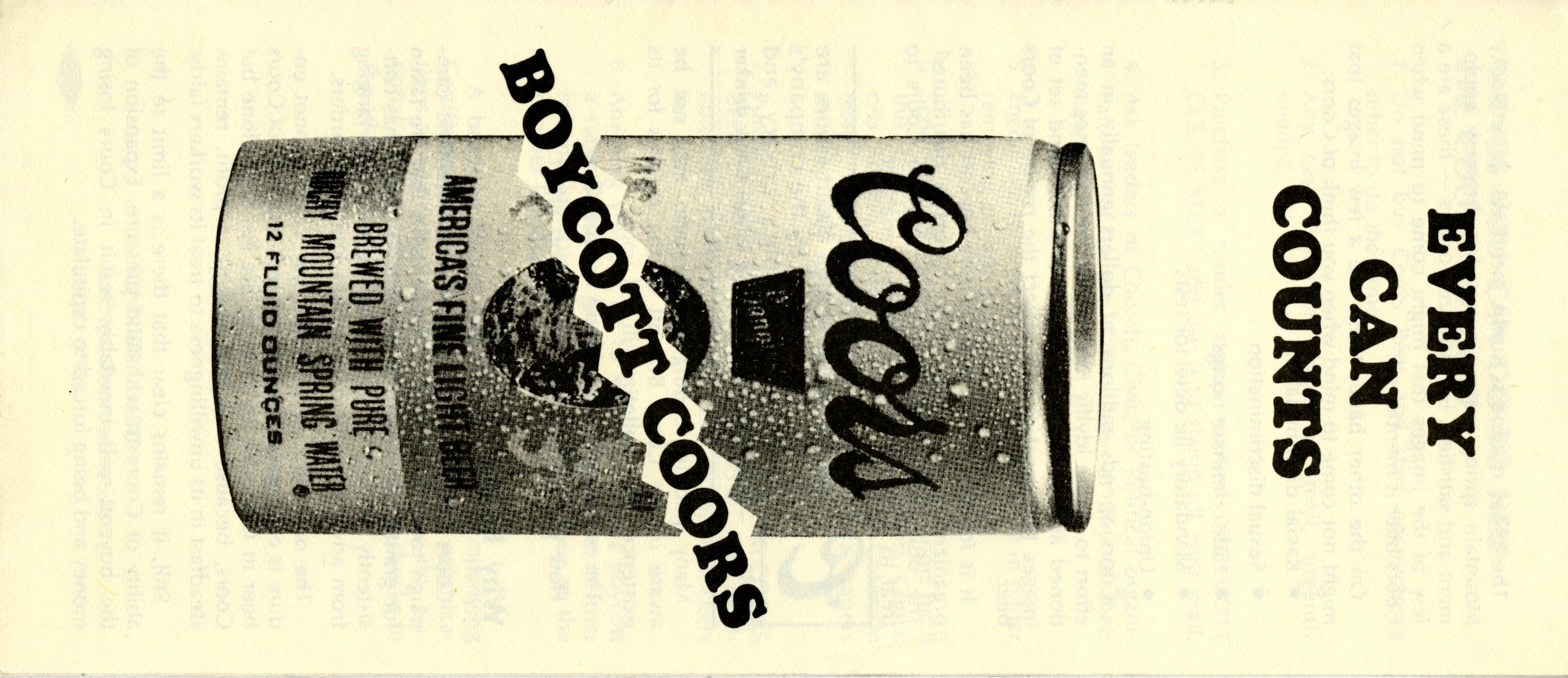
Local 366 Coors Boycott Pamphlet, Juan Federico “Freddie Freak” Trujillo Collection, Colorado State University – Pueblo Archives.

In 1976, under Colorado's Labor Peace Law provisions, Coors demanded a vote amongst brewery workers on whether the brewery would remain a union shop. In a vote held that December, the union shop was kept, with 92 percent voting in favor. On March 1 of the following year, the labor contract between Coors and the local expired, and ensuing negotiations on a new contract were bogged down by disagreements between the two. The disagreements were not related to pay but instead concerned the company's grounds for dismissal and their use of polygraph testing for applicants. Additionally, the company had wanted to change policies regarding seniority rights, which the union opposed. On April 5, 1977, approximately 1,500 (Note: One source gives this number as approximately 1,400. A 1988 article in The New York Times gives a specific number of 1,472.) union members began a strike action against the company with a mass walkout. However, the next day, the company sent letters to the striking employees saying that they would hire strikebreakers if necessary and that, if the striking worker were replaced, they ran the risk of losing their position within the company. On April 12, the AFL–CIO announced a national boycott of Coors in support of Local 366. Around this time, then-company president Jeff Coors, in speaking to the Los Angeles Times, stated that agreeing to the union's proposals was like "inviting the Russians in to take over America".

Shortly after the strike's start, Coors began pushing for the union shop rule at the brewery to be revoked, which was strongly opposed by the strikers. According to a company official, Coors "didn't believe non-strikers should be forced to join the union or that people should be forced to pay union dues to support the boycott". Within several weeks from the start of the strike, hundreds of strikebreakers had been hired, and many strikers had returned to work. Soon, the main issues of the strike concerned keeping the union shop rule and pushing for the rehiring of strikers. By early 1978, Coors was seeking a vote on whether to decertify the union, and, after agreeing to pay $254,000 in back pay, the ballot became official. By June, it was reported that a majority of strikers had returned to work, and by the time of the vote in early December, (Note: Sources vary on the exact dates of the vote, with a 1979 article in The Washington Post stating that voting happened from December 13 to 14, while a 1991 book by Russ Bellant gives the vote dates as December 14 and 15. The Associated Press reported on the "[u]nofficial returns" in the voting tally as happening on the night of December 14.) only 500 of the initial 1,500 strikers were still on strike. The Associated Press reported on December 14 that workers had voted 993 to 408 to decertify Brewery Workers Local 366, bringing an end to the strike.

== Continued boycott ==
In 1979, both the American GI Forum and the California-based Mexican American Political Association announced that they were ending their boycott, with the GI Forum stating that there had been "some improvement" from the company. However, despite the decertification vote, the AFL–CIO stated their intent to continue their nationwide boycott. Additionally, in the following years, protestors began targeting the Coors Classic, a Colorado-based road bicycle race sponsored by Coors. Around 1984, the National Education Association (a non-AFL–CIO union with approximately 2 million members at the time, making it the largest labor union in the United States) voted to support the boycott. That same year, the National Organization for Women also launched a boycott due in part to Joseph Coors' opposition to the Equal Rights Amendment, and with Coors' expansion into Massachusetts, students at the University of Massachusetts Amherst voted to ban the beer from the college. Around this time, however, Coors began reaching out to groups that had threatened to boycott. In October 1987, the company signed a $325 million agreement with a coalition consisting of the NAACP and Operation PUSH, two African American activist organizations. An additional $300 million agreement was made with the Hispanic group La Raza, with the company agreeing to do more business with minority businesses and contractors and hire more minority workers, among other things. As a result of the agreements, the NAACP ended their threats to boycott Coors. The agreements also helped the company's relationship with groups including the National Urban League and the League of United Latin American Citizens.

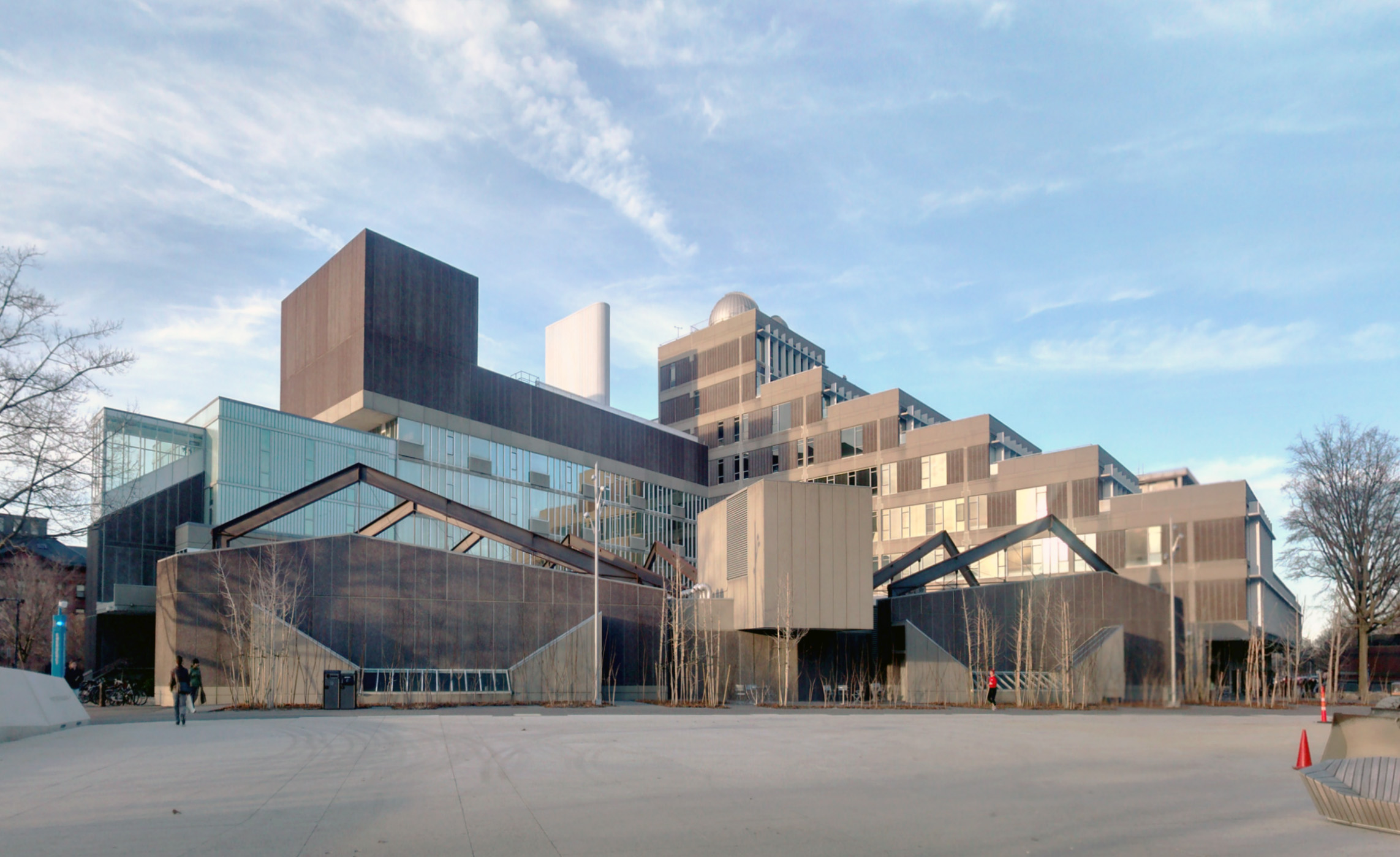
Approximately 200 students picketed Joseph Coors outside the Harvard Science Center in February 1987.

In 1986, the South Dakota Farmers Union announced they would also be boycotting Coors following advertisements Coors released that the union said cast aspersions on local barley farmers. That same year, Coors announced they would be ending their use of polygraph testing, which had been one of the main issues between the company and union. The replacement screening process would involve a partnership with the firm Equifax, with a company representative stating that the screening process would still allow the company to find if applicants were communists or on narcotics. By 1987, Coors had expanded its market to include 47 states, and it was the only brewery among the top 15 in the nation that was not unionized. In February of that year, during a speech given by William Coors at the Harvard Science Center in Cambridge, Massachusetts, approximately 200 Harvard University students picketed the executive and his company. That same month, Coors expanded their market to include New York and New Jersey, with the AFL–CIO organizing a regional boycott. However, at the time, the non-AFL–CIO affiliated Teamsters were not part of the boycott, instead focusing on organizing the workers at a Coors brewery in Elkton, Virginia. In March, a scuffle broke out at the New York State Capitol in Albany, New York between union members and Coors wholesalers during an event held by company representatives who were publicizing Coors' expansion into the state.

== End of the boycott ==
=== Agreement between the AFL–CIO and Coors ===
In 1985, Pete Coors took over the company's day-to-day operations from his father Joseph and immediately began negotiating with the AFL–CIO on an agreement that would end the boycott. The AFL–CIO rejected Coors' initial offer in February 1987, but on August 19, they announced that they had come to an agreement with the company and would end their boycott. Among the concessions, the company agreed to use union workers in the construction of their new facility in Virginia. This had been a point of contention that prevented the February agreement from being approved. Additionally, the AFL–CIO and the company claimed that the agreement would make it easier for worker organization efforts at Coors facilities, However, any union vote would be overseen by a third party such as the American Arbitration Association rather than the National Labor Relations Board (NLRB). Shortly after the agreement, the International Association of Machinists and Aerospace Workers (IAM) announced their intent to start organizing drives at both the Elkton and Golden facilities, while the International Union of Operating Engineers (IUOE) and the United Auto Workers (UAW) also expressed interest in organizing Coors workers. An AFL–CIO representative at the time of the announcement claimed that it was "arguably the biggest victory in my time at the federation, and that covers 18 years", while AFL–CIO president Lane Kirkland called the boycott "a complete success, a resounding success" and commented on the "more positive approach taken by (the new) management" at Coors. However, some union members criticized the agreement, as Coors did not guarantee a union contract. At the time, union membership in the United States had been on the decline, with activist and writer Jonathan Tasini stating, "Organized labor has been in such desperate straits that the Coors settlement has been perceived as a victory – even though the workers at Coors are still without a union."

=== Teamsters union drive ===
At the time of the agreement, the Teamsters were attempting to organize workers at the Golden facility. The Los Angeles Times reported that the AFL–CIO saw this as a threat to possible union efforts by the IAM, IUOE, and UAW. As part of the agreement, only AFL–CIO unions would be guaranteed an expedited vote on union representation. Following the agreement, the Teamsters continued their efforts to organize at the Golden plant. In late 1987, the Teamsters became an AFL–CIO affiliate. Following this, the Teamsters were the AFL–CIO union tasked with the organization at the Golden plant. In September 1988, it was reported that the Teamsters and Coors disagreed on whether a union vote would include only brewery workers (favored by the Teamsters), or an additional 2,000 container workers who were less favorable to unions (favored by Coors). The dispute was at the time being settled by the NLRB. Ultimately, only the brewery workers participated in the union vote. (Note: Sources differ on the number of brewery workers at the plant at the time of the vote, with sources claiming 1,500, 1,600, and 1,700.) On December 15, 1988, workers at the Golden plant voted against unionizing with the Teamsters. The vote came after 18 months of campaigning, with the final vote being 1,081 against to 413 in favor of unionizing. Among the issues presented during the campaign, the Teamsters cited increased wages and pension plans with Teamsters members at Anheuser-Busch as examples of what could happen with a union at Coors. However, Coors rebutted that Anheuser-Busch was larger than Coors and could therefore afford the larger pay and benefits.

== Impact ==
The strike and boycotts had a considerable impact on Coors, with Jonathan Tasini stating that they "effectively helped stunt the company's growth". In the late 1970s, the company's market share in California had dropped from a high of over 40 percent to just 14 percent. In the company's home state of Colorado, there was a similar drop from 47 percent in 1977 to 24 percent in 1984. In 1987, the Los Angeles Times claimed that "Coors officers have conceded that the boycott, which was joined over the years by various special-interest groups opposed to the outspoken political conservatism of Coors family patriarch Joseph Coors, had damaged its main market areas in the West and its drive for nationwide sales". However, these numbers and the impact the boycott had on the decline are disputed by Coors representatives. A company representative in 1983 claimed that, while the boycott hurt sales in California, the overall decline in sales during this time was due to increased competition from the Miller Brewing Company and Anheuser-Busch. Speaking later about the boycott, Pete Coors stated that "the '70s and early '80s were not a stellar time for the company". The decrease in market share in Coors' limited market area may have contributed to the company's decision to expand nationwide, with the company having a presence in every state except Indiana by 1988. This is compared to the company's stance in 1975 when a company representative claimed there were no plans at the time to expand to the eastern United States.

== Legacy in the LGBT community ==
In the years after the boycott ended, the relationship between Coors and the LGBT community remained frayed. In a 1998 article from the alternative newspaper The Village Voice, the Gay & Lesbian Alliance Against Defamation was criticized for accepting a $110,000 donation from Coors, stating that, at the time, the boycott was still active in the LGBT community. At the time, Coors was trying to make inroads into the LGBT community by increasing advertisements targeting the community (several of which highlighted the fact that the company offered domestic partnership benefits to workers) and donating to events such as pride parades. However, individuals within the community criticized the company's past and the Coors family's continued support for right-wing politics. As a representative for ACT UP stated in that Village Voice article, "The change in employee practices is important. But meanwhile they're still trying to kill us. For anyone in the gay community to do business with Coors is suicidal." In 2002, the LGBT newspaper Out Front Colorado was criticized for refusing to run an ad submitted by the LGBT committee of the National Lawyers Guild that criticized Coors and contended that the boycott was still active. In 2019, union and LGBT activist Nancy Wohlforth commented that "to this day, you can't find Coors in a gay bar in San Francisco", a claim backed up by a 2017 article by the Teamsters on the impact of the boycott. A 2014 article published by Colorado Public Radio stated that "grudges against Coors continue" among groups that had been involved in the boycotts.

== Sources ==
- Anderson, Dave (October 8, 2015). "Public messaging vs. internal practices". Boulder Weekly. Archived from the original on March 14, 2021.
- Bellant, Russ (1991). The Coors Connection: How Coors Family Philanthropy Undermines Democratic Pluralism (2nd ed.). Cambridge, Massachusetts: South End Press. ISBN 978-0-89608-416-2 – via Google Books.
- Brantley, Allyson P. (June 3, 2021a). "The solution to the craft beer industry's sexism and diversity problems". The Washington Post. Archived from the original on June 3, 2021.
- Cole, B. Erin; Brantley, Allyson (October 3, 2014). "The Coors Boycott: When A Beer Can Signaled Your Politics". Colorado Public Radio. Archived from the original on March 20, 2021.
- Crisman, Robert (Winter 1978). "Coors: Joseph Coors has met the enemy". Freedom Socialist. Freedom Socialist Party. Archived from the original on February 11, 2020.
- Dewar, Helen (January 22, 1979). "Coors Flattens Brewery Workers Union, Battles Boycott". The Washington Post. Archived from the original on June 4, 2021.
- Gold, Tami (Winter 1999). "Making out at Work". Social Text. 17 (61). Duke University Press: 89–110. ISSN 0164-2472. JSTOR 488681.
- Grossman, Evan O. (March 5, 1987). "Is Coors the One?". The Harvard Crimson. Archived from the original on June 23, 2014.
- Hsiao, Andrew (November 3, 1998). "The GLAAD Hand of Coors". The Village Voice. Archived from the original on September 16, 2018.
- Hurt III, Harry (March 1976). "Muscling In On Texas Beer". Texas Monthly. Archived from the original on June 5, 2021.
- "Teamsters Pride At Work: A Look Back At The Coors Boycott". International Brotherhood of Teamsters. June 2, 2017. Archived from the original on January 28, 2021.
- Ivins, Molly (May 28, 1979). "Union at Coors May Be Broken But It Hasn't Halted Its Boycott". The New York Times. ISSN 0362-4331. Archived from the original on August 20, 2020.
- Jimenez, Rolando (April 1976). "COORS: El Precio Que Pagamos". El Despertador. 5 (3): 2. JSTOR community.28035516.
- Johnston, Oswald (August 20, 1987). "AFL-CIO Ends 10-Year Boycott of Coors Beer". Los Angeles Times. Archived from the original on June 5, 2021.
- Jones, Cleve (March 15, 2009). "What Would Harvey Milk Say About President Clinton's Speech at the Manchester Hyatt?". The Huffington Post. Archived from the original on June 6, 2021.
- Kelleher, Susan; Reid, T. R. (December 17, 1988). "TEAMSTERS DEFEATED AT COORS". The Washington Post. ISSN 0190-8286. Archived from the original on December 10, 2020.
- Kelly, Kim (June 7, 2019). "How LGBTQ Union Activists Transformed the Labor Movement". Teen Vogue. Condé Nast. Archived from the original on March 21, 2021.
- Knudson, Thomas J. (September 7, 1987). "Labor Truce Welcomed at Coors Base". The New York Times. ISSN 0362-4331. Archived from the original on November 5, 2017.
- Lichtenstein, Grace (December 28, 1975). "Sold only in the West, Coors beer is smuggled to the East. Henry Kissinger drinks it. So does Paul Newman, though he would abhor the Coors family's politics". The New York Times. ISSN 0362-4331. Archived from the original on November 12, 2020.
- "Coors to Stop Using Lie Detectors". Los Angeles Times. Associated Press. August 29, 1986. Archived from the original on November 12, 2020.
- "10-Year Coors Boycott Ends as Unions Win Concessions : Firm OKs Voting at Colo. Plant". Los Angeles Times. Associated Press. August 19, 1987. Archived from the original on April 9, 2021.
- McDevitt, John (July 28, 2015). "The Coors Boycott: The LGBTQ movement and people's counter-offensive against the right". Liberation News. Party for Socialism and Liberation. Archived from the original on January 22, 2021.
- Mirken, Bruce (July 13, 2001). "Coors Courts Gays". Mother Jones. Archived from the original on December 5, 2020.
- "Coors bitter brew". Now. July 29, 2004. Archived from the original on April 5, 2022.
- Peterson, Iver (December 2, 1984). "Making Big Business a Threat it Can't Refuse". The New York Times. ISSN 0362-4331. Archived from the original on January 30, 2018.
- "Coors Boycott Coordinator Expresses Appreciation" (PDF). President's Newsletter. 1 (20). United Farmworkers of America. March 20, 1978. Archived from the original (PDF) on March 18, 2015.
- Prial, Frank J. (March 9, 1987). "Union Boycott of Coors Extended to New York". The New York Times. ISSN 0362-4331. Archived from the original on November 3, 2017.
- Richter, Paul (September 27, 1987). "Coors' New Brew: Taking Out the Political Aftertaste". Los Angeles Times. Archived from the original on November 25, 2020.
- Roberts, Michael (June 27, 2002). "A Brewing Disagreement". Westword. Archived from the original on December 1, 2020.
- Shilts, Randy (1982). The Mayor of Castro Street: The Life and Times of Harvey Milk. St. Martin's Press. ISBN 978-0-312-56085-0 – via Google Books.
- Stumbo, Bella (September 18, 1988). "Brewing Controversy : Coors Clan: Doing It Their Way". Los Angeles Times. Archived from the original on April 6, 2021.
- Tasini, Jonathan (January 31, 1988). "The Beer and The Boycott". The New York Times. ISSN 0362-4331. Archived from the original on May 12, 2021.
- "Around the Nation". The New York Times. Associated Press. December 15, 1978. ISSN 0362-4331. Archived from the original on March 7, 2018.
- "Coors Tries to Conquer Southeast Beer Market". The New York Times. April 2, 1983. ISSN 0362-4331. Archived from the original on February 14, 2018.
- "A.F.L.-C.I.O. Agrees to End Boycott of Coors". The New York Times. Associated Press. August 20, 1987. ISSN 0362-4331. Archived from the original on November 4, 2017.
- "Coors Workers Reject Teamsters". The New York Times. Associated Press. December 17, 1988. ISSN 0362-4331. Archived from the original on January 30, 2018.
- Wins, Molly (June 12, 1978). "Union's Survival Is at Stake in 14-Month Strike at Coors Brewery". The New York Times. ISSN 0362-4331. Archived from the original on December 10, 2020.
