= CoorsTek =

American ceramic manufacturing company

CoorsTek, Inc.
- Type: Private
- Industry: Technical Ceramics for semiconductor, automotive, medical, oil and gas and many other industries
- Founded: (1910), Golden, Colorado, U.S.
- Founders: Adolph Coors Sr.; John J. Herold
- Headquarters: Golden, CO, United States
- Number of locations: 61
- Area served: Worldwide
- Key people: Jonathan Coors, (CO-CEO); Michael Coors, (CO-CEO); Timothy I. Coors, (CO-CEO)
- Products: Engineered Ceramics
- Services: Ceramic powder processing; Analytical laboratories
- Revenue: US$820 million (estimate)
- Owner: The Coors family
- Number of employees: 5,900 (2015)
- Divisions: Structural Ceramics; Electronic Ceramics; Vehicle & Personal Armor
- Subsidiaries: Ceramatec; DEW Engineering; EmiSense; Select Ion
- Website: www.coorstek.com

CoorsTek, Inc. is a privately owned manufacturer of technical ceramics for aerospace, automotive, chemical, electronics, medical, metallurgical, oil and gas, semiconductor and many other industries. CoorsTek headquarters and primary factories are located in Golden, Colorado, US. The company is wholly owned by Keystone Holdings LLC, a trust of the Coors family. John K. Coors, a great-grandson of founder and brewing magnate Adolph Coors Sr., and the fifth and youngest son of longtime chairman and president Joseph Coors, retired as president and chairman in January 2020 after 22 years.

== History ==
=== Adolph Coors and John Herold ===
Prussian-born Adolph Coors (1847–1929) opened the Colorado Glass Works in 1887 with fellow German immigrant Joachim Binder and James R. Ward to manufacture beer bottles for his brewery, the Adolph Coors Brewing Company, west of Denver. In 1888, the glass works, incorporated as Coors, Binder & Co., was idled by a strike and never reopened. The remaining building of the Glass Works by 1910, its warehouse, was leased to Austrian-born John J. Herold (1871–1923) and incorporated as the Herold China and Pottery Company situated upon the site at 600 Ninth Street in Golden. Herold used clay from nearby mines to make tableware and heat-resistant ovenware under the trademark Herold Fireproof China, with major financial support from Coors.

The now-abandoned clay pits form the western boundary of the Colorado School of Mines (CSM) campus. CSM professor Herman Fleck helped Herold perfect his glazing technique. Adolph Coors became the majority stockholder and was elected to the board of directors of Herold China in 1912.

John Herold resigned in 1912 due to tuberculosis and other health concerns, and Adolph Coors Company acquired Herold China in 1914. Herold returned later in 1914 to manage the plant, but left permanently in 1915 for the Guernsey Earthenware Co. in Cambridge, Ohio. Adolph Coors II (1884–1970) was the first vice-president (VP) and general manager (GM). CSM evaluated Fireproof China for industrial applications in 1914, and found it suitable.

The company began producing chemical porcelain in 1915 as a result of a World War I embargo on German imports. Adolph Coors' third son, Herman F. Coors (1890–1967), was named manager in 1916, during which year the plant's iconic brick face upon Ford Street was built. Employment increased from 37 employees in 1915 to 75 in 1917. The plant became the largest employer of women in Golden, with Herman Coors advertising specifically for female employees in the Golden Transcript. Herold China was renamed Coors Porcelain Company in 1920, and the trademark "Coors U.S.A." was first used. The Rocky Mountain Bottle Company, maker of Coors beer bottles in nearby Wheat Ridge and a joint venture with Owens-Brockway Glass Container Inc., came long after Coors, Binder & Co., and has never been affiliated with Coors Porcelain.

=== Rosebud porcelain and Prohibition after WW1 ===
After World War I, Coors Porcelain made tableware and cookware bearing the trademarks Rosebud, Glencoe Thermo-Porcelain, Coorado, Mello-Tone and others. During Prohibition, the ceramic business was largely what kept the parent company afloat.

The original factory site at 600 Ninth Street in Golden was the only Coors Porcelain facility until the 1970s, and remained the company headquarters until a new facility was built northeast of Golden in the early 1990s. The 440,000 sq ft (41,000 m^{2}) Ninth St. plant consists of several adjoining buildings that occupy four square blocks, and was CoorsTek's largest manufacturing site until it closed in 2021.

Herman Frederick Coors managed the company in the early days. Herman's older brother, Grover Cleveland Coors (1888–1954), began the fledgling company's foray into ceramic technology by inventing a tool for forming spark plug insulation in 1919. Chemist Harold W. Ryland (1881–1966) was hired in 1923, and worked his way up to GM and VP of Porcelain and mayor of Golden 1939–45 before his 1957 retirement. Germany became competitive once again in 1926, and put downward pressure on Coors' chemical porcelain business. Adolph I's death in 1929 put Adolph II solely in charge of the idled A. Coors Co. brewery and Porcelain both, until his sons Adolph III, Bill and Joe joined in the 1940s.

Herman Coors offered to buy Porcelain in the early 1920s after frequent management disagreements with his father and older brother, but was refused. Herman left in 1922 to develop clays mined by the Alberhill Coal and Clay Company for use in china that could compete with imports. He started the H.F. Coors China Company, a manufacturer of dishes for restaurants and institutional use, in Inglewood, California, in 1925. Grover also had friction with Adolph Jr., left for California in 1924, and eventually became a representative for the brewery there.

The H.F. Coors pottery's trademarks include Coorsite, Alox flatware and Chefsware. Herman retired from Coors China in 1946, and was succeeded by his son Robert M. Coors (1920–2004). Robert's brother Dallas Morse Coors (1917–1996) was the VP. Robert retired in 1978, and sold the 125-employee company to Standex International Corporation.^{,}

Standex was preparing to close Coors China and sell its property for redevelopment circa 2003. Mug-maker Catalina China Inc. of Tucson, Arizona, acquired the assets of Coors China from Standex, and moved the company to Tucson in 2003. The assets included a 200-ft-long gas-fired tunnel kiln.

Figure 1: CoorsTek ceramic products. All are glazed porcelain except C. A Fisher filtration funnel; B Buchner funnel; C 99.8% alumina crucible; D Desiccator plate; E Commemorative thimble-size stein for brewery visitors; F 95-mm diameter crucible rack.

=== Aluminum beer cans ===
In the 1950s, Coors Porcelain's parent company investigated the possibility of replacing steel beverage cans with aluminum ones, as part of a closed-loop recycling system. The effort was the brainchild of W.K. "Bill" Coors (1916–2018), the second son of Adolph II and the vice-president of Porcelain.

Coors formed a joint venture with Beatrice Foods (then parent of Primo Beer in Hawai'i), named Aluminum International, to develop the seamless aluminum can. Coors built a pilot plant at the southeast corner of 8th Street and Washington Avenue in 1955 for the aluminum can line. After years of experiments, failures and successes, including the ill-fated late 1954 rollout by Primo of the can which proved not yet ready for market due to flaws, Coors at last unveiled the perfected seamless aluminum can to the world in January 1959.

In 1970, Coors resumed their ambitious and aggressive program called "Cash for Cans", which operated throughout Coors' 11-state marketing area offering a penny a can. Coors success with the aluminum industry was a critical breakthrough in the development of America's recycling market and collection infrastructure.

The can operation eventually outgrew the Porcelain building (which was then absorbed into the main porcelain plant as Building 10) and moved into its present location east of the brewery in 1966. The can, end and bottle factories were jointly managed by Joe Coors as Coors Container Company from 1971 to 1981. Coors Brewing Company reorganized its 340-employee can, end and tab operations into a joint venture with the Ball Corporation in 2002, known as Rocky Mountain Metal Container LLC.^{,} Coors Ceramics began developing hot-pressed SiC-whisker-reinforced Al_{2}O_{3} ceramic tooling for beverage can machinery in the 1990s.

On January 22, 2009, the original Coors can plant was named an ASM Historical Landmark by the Board of Trustees of ASM International, for its role in ushering in the age of recyclable aluminum beverage containers. The date marked the 50th anniversary of Coors' first aluminum can. The building, known though later years as Building 10, proved too incapable of adaptive reuse upon the plant's redevelopment commenced in 2024 and it was largely taken down, but its remaining glass block windows were salvaged and a remaining portion of its northeast wall kept standing with the goal of preserving it as part of the project.

=== Technical ceramics and company growth after WW2 ===
The company gradually diversified its lines of technical ceramics before and especially after World War II. The factory was enlarged by 40,000 ft^{2} in 1960. Coors greatly expanded its product lines, reduced scrap and accelerated production with the aid of cold isostatic pressing in the 1940s; metallizing, tape casting and hot isostatic pressing in the 1950s; and multilayer ceramic capacitors in the 1960s. A four-story high, 32-ft diameter spray dryer with 5000 lb/hr capacity was installed in 1962.

Lawrence Radiation Laboratory awarded Coors a 2-year contract in 1963 to produce enriched urania-beryllia fuel elements for Project Pluto's Tory II-C nuclear ramjet engine, which increased employment by 230 to a then-record 1100 total. High-alumina (85 to 99.9% Al_{2}O_{3}) ceramics replaced porcelain (mixed-oxide ceramics, e.g., mullite) in many thermomechanical, electrical and chemical applications. Coors engineers invented fully dense, glass-free 99.5+% Al_{2}O_{3} ceramics in 1964, useful for many applications where porcelain is deficient.^{,}

Growth in the 1970s enabled Coors to build the 150,000 ft^{2} electronic ceramics Clear Creek Valley Plant east of Golden in 1970, and its first facility outside of Golden, an electronic substrate plant in Grand Junction, CO, in 1975. Coors made its first purchase of a competitor when it bought Wilbanks Inc. of Hillsboro, Oregon, in 1973. Two more competitors, Research Instrument Co. of Norman, Oklahoma, and Alumina Ceramics Inc. of Benton, Arkansas, were acquired in 1975 and '76, resp. Coors opened its first foreign factory in Glenrothes, Scotland, in 1981. Two more foreign subsidiaries were acquired in the early 1980s, an electronic ceramics plant in Singapore and a paper-tooling plant in Brazil. Coors began making silicon carbide, silicon nitride, spinel, zirconia and several other ceramic products by the mid-1980s.

Figure 2: CoorsTek ceramic products. A Porcelain pestle; B Porcelain mortar; C Glazed porcelain casserole; D Glazed porcelain 100-mm long boat; E TTZ (toughened zirconia) putter; F 99.8% alumina tray. Scale: the coin between E & F is a U.S. quarter.

=== The Joe Coors era ===
Joseph "Joe" Coors Sr. (1917–2003), third son of Adolph II, joined Porcelain in 1940 after graduation from Cornell University and stints at DuPont and National Dairy Products Corp. He was promoted to president in 1946, and became a member of the board of directors and an executive of Adolph Coors Company as well in 1952. Joe was named a Fellow of the American Ceramic Society (ACerS) in 1967, and an Honorary Member of ACerS in 1985.

=== Coors Porcelain becomes Coors Ceramics ===
Coors Porcelain was renamed Coors Ceramics Company in 1986, shortly after Joseph Coors Jr. (1942–2016),^{,} succeeded R. Derald Whiting (1923–1995) as president. At the time, porcelain was a small part of the 12-plant, 2200-employee company's output. High-alumina ceramics were and remain the company's primary products. Joe Jr., a mathematician and quality engineer, had been at Wilbanks 1973-84 and was its president 1980–84, and the vice-president for quality at Coors Porcelain 1984-5 prior to his promotion. Joe Jr. promptly reorganized the company into two divisions, Electronic and Structural.

=== Chaired professor and ceramic research at CSM ===
Janet H. Coors (1912–1994), widow of Herman Coors, endowed the Colorado Center for Advanced Ceramics (CCAC) at the Colorado School of Mines in 1988 with $2 million, and established the H.F. Coors Distinguished Professor of Ceramic Engineering chair. Coors executive David G. Wirth Jr. (1937–2017), was appointed as the first director of CCAC. Dennis W. Readey left the Ohio State University to become the first Coors Professor and succeeded Wirth as director of CCAC. Readey, a Fellow of ACerS, served as president of ACerS in 1991–2, and was named a Distinguished Life Member of ACerS in 2002. Upon his retirement, Readey was succeeded as Coors Professor by Nigel Sammes, and as director of CCAC by Ivar Reimanis. Reimanis was promoted to the Coors Chair in 2012 upon Sammes' retirement. Geoff Brennecka was awarded the Coors Chair in 2022.

John Coors earned his B.Sc. in chemical engineering at CSM in 1977, the first of eleven Coors family members to graduate from Mines as of 2014. W. Grover Coors, a brother of John, earned his Ph.D. at CSM in 2001 and has been a research professor in CCAC as well as an employee of CoorsTek. VP Doug Coors holds a B.Sc. in Engineering Physics, Co-CEO Michael Coors holds a B.Sc. in Mechanical Engineering, and Co-CEO Timothy Coors (son of Jeff) a B.Sc. in Chemical and Petroleum Refining Engineering, from Mines. Michael was appointed to the Mines Board of Trustees by Gov. Jared Polis in Jan 2024.

CoorsTek endowed CSM with $26.9 million, the largest in Mines' history, for the construction of the CoorsTek Center for Applied Science and Engineering, in September 2014. Ground was broken for the new 95,000 sq. ft. (8800 m^{2}) building on 2 May 2016 on the former site of Meyer Hall, the home of the physics department. CoorsTek employed about 50 CSM alumni at the time of the announcement.^{,}

=== The Coors empire separates ===
Adolph Coors Company became a holding company in 1989, with Coors Brewing Company as its largest subsidiary. The non-brewing subsidiaries were spun off late in 1992 under a new holding company, ACX Technologies, Inc. (NYSE: ACX), with Bill Coors as chairman of both holding companies. The key subsidiaries of ACX were Coors Ceramics Co.; Graphic Packaging International Inc., with Joe Jr.'s younger brother J.H. "Jeff" Coors as chairman and president; Golden Technologies Company (GTC), a collection of R&D projects headed by former Wilbanks executive Dean Rulis; and Golden Aluminum Company, with Joe Jr. as its interim president.

Most of the ceramics-related GTC projects were folded into Coors Ceramics, while others were sold to investors or shut down with the demise of GTC in the late 1990s. Golden Aluminum was sold to Alcoa in 1999, and is now an independent remelter and rolling mill in Fort Lupton, Colorado. Graphic Pkg., previously Coors Packaging Co. 1974–88, merged with Riverwood International Corp. in 2003 and moved its headquarters to suburban Atlanta, but kept a 250-employee plant in Golden until 2010 that supplied paperboard packaging for Coors beer.

ACX and Adolph Coors Co. had many common stockholders including the Coors family, but were otherwise entirely independent of one another. Coors Ceramics Co. was no longer affiliated with the Coors brewery. Coors Ceramics' headquarters moved from Ninth St. in Golden to a new building in the Coors Technology Center in an unincorporated area northeast of Golden.^{,}

=== Acquisitions and diversification ===
In an effort to broaden its business beyond mostly structural and insulating ceramics, Coors Ceramics made several acquisitions in the late 1990s, especially of suppliers to the semiconductor industry. Coors acquired plastics manufacturer Tetrafluor Inc. of El Segundo, California, in August 1997 for $15.8 million. Coors bought precision machine shops Edwards Enterprises of Newark, California, and Precision Technologies of Livermore, California, in March 1998 for $18 million and $22 million, respectively. Coors acquired ceramic maker Doo Young Semitek Co., Ltd., of Kyungbook, South Korea, for $3.6 million in December 1999. Coors purchased machine shop Liberty Machine Inc. of Fremont, California, US for $4 million in March 2000.

In 1993, Coors sold circuit board manufacturer Microlithics Corp. to VisiCom Laboratories, and its ceramic subsidiaries in Ocean Springs, Mississippi and Rio Claro, São Paulo, to undisclosed buyers. CoorsTek bought BAE Systems' Advanced Ceramics in Vista, California, in 2011 for $7 million, and added product lines in body armor, helicopter seat plating and ceramic heaters. In September 2013 CoorsTek purchased Innovative Medical Device Solutions of Fort Worth, Texas, for an undisclosed amount, merged it with C5 Medical Werks of Colorado, and created a new subsidiary, CoorsTek Medical LLC.

=== Coors Ceramics becomes CoorsTek ===
In 2000, ACX was dissolved and Coors Ceramics became an independent, publicly traded company under the name CoorsTek, Inc.^{,} Annual revenue was $334M and an operating loss of $32M was reported for 1999. CoorsTek was traded on the NASDAQ under the symbol CRTK. Joe Jr. retired as chairman of CoorsTek in 2000, and was succeeded by his younger brother John (b. 1956). John had been president since Oct 1998. Revenue jumped to $540M in 2000, with record operating income of $58.0M. Worldwide employment declined in 2001 from 4200 at the beginning of the year to 2400 in mid-2002, due largely to a semiconductor industry slump. Keystone Holdings LLC, a trust of the Coors family that owned 27% of CoorsTek stock, bought the remaining 73% it did not already own, and took the company private once again in 2003.

John Coors had been the president of Golden Genesis Corp. (GGC), a manufacturer of photovoltaic devices for solar power collection in Scottsdale, Arizona. ACX owned 55% of GGC stock (Nasdaq: GGGO), which it sold to Kyocera Solar Inc. in 1999 for $30 miilion

=== Saint-Gobain acquisition ===
CoorsTek signed an agreement in June 2010 to buy certain assets of the Advanced Ceramics division of the French conglomerate Saint-Gobain.^{,} The Advanced Ceramics division employed 1200 workers worldwide, and 500 at six North American sites, at the time. CoorsTek gained ownership of several longtime competing brands, such as Cerbec Si_{3}N_{4} bearings, Solcera and Cerastat. The transaction was completed in January 2011, with CoorsTek assuming ownership of six plants in Europe; four in the USA; one each in Canada, Mexico and Brazil; and sales offices in Japan, China, Taiwan and Singapore. The acquisition gave CoorsTek a total of 44 facilities on four continents, and increased capabilities in SiC, Si_{3}N_{4}, mullite and steatite. Compagnie de Saint-Gobain retained ownership of its 22 High-Performance Refractories, Lo-Mass, Carborundum Abrasive Products and Hexoloy SiC products business sites.

=== Covalent Materials Corp. acquisition ===
CoorsTek acquired Covalent Materials Corp., formerly Toshiba Ceramics Co., and its three factories in Japan in December 2014 for ~$450M, the largest acquisition in CoorsTek's history. The transaction gave CoorsTek over 50 production facilities in 14 countries on four continents, with over 6,000 employees. Covalent began as Toyo Fire Brick Company in 1918 in Tokyo, and later became Toshiba Refractories Co. Toshiba Refractories merged with Toshiba Denko to become Toshiba Ceramics Co., Ltd., in 1968, with factories in Oguni, Yamagata; Hatano, Kanagawa; and Kariya, Aichi. Covalent's product line includes crucibles, heating elements, refractory bricks, and components for the semiconductor and flat panel display industries, made of silicon carbide, boron carbide, alumina, graphite, yttria and silicon. Its trademarks include Cerasic, Sapphal, Exyria, Glassun, Neobone and Ceraphite. The crucibles business was sold to Momentive Technologies in 2022.

CoorsTek revenues increased to $1.25 billion since the Coors family-owned Keystone Trust bought all the stock in 2003. CoorsTek claims it has turned a net profit every single quarter since then. Forbes magazine estimated that CoorsTek's cash flow reached $340 million in 2015. CoorsTek was worth an estimated $2.5 billion in 2015, about $200 million more than the family's 16% stake in the brewery.

CoorsTek sold the crucibles business from the Covalent acquisition to Momentive Technologies Inc. of Strongsville, Ohio, in 2022.

Production was discontinued at CoorsTek's original site at 600 Ninth St. in Golden in 2021. The company plans to redevelop the property into its world headquarters and other commercial uses. Much of the complex was deconstructed in 2024, with many artifacts from the site saved including those from decades of porcelain plant operation (including the kiln that made insulators for the Manhattan Project) and unearthed remains from the 1880s era Colorado Glass Works. The historic and iconic 1916 brick face on Ford Street, along with a portion of the plant's major 1926 addition, its 1940s buildings from the World War II era, combination steel and concrete tower building and a portion of the 1955 aluminum can pilot plant, were preserved, with modern buildout of the new headquarters from these commenced in 2025.

== Products and services ==
- 99.8% alumina tubing, crucibles and thermocouple sheaths
- Analytical laboratories specializing in ceramic products
- Cera-Check beams for coordinate measuring machines
- CeraShield ceramic armor
- CeraSurf-p alumina-zirconia hip replacement
- Ceramic powder preparation, including ball milling and spray drying
- Cera-Slide paper-making tooling
- Coors USA laboratory wares
- Cyclone liners and wear-resistant tiles for effluent separation and mineral dressing
- Electronic 96% alumina substrates and ceramic dual in-line packages
- Exhaust port liners and other engine components
- Grinding media
- Kiln furniture, heat exchangers, refractories
- Metallized waveguides and stand-off insulators for electric power transmission and telecommunications
- Micro-filtration devices for medical applications
- Proppants for fracking
- Pump plungers and seal rings
- Valve plates for washerless faucets
- Wire-drawing capstans and dies
- Zirconia oxygen sensors

== Subsidiaries ==
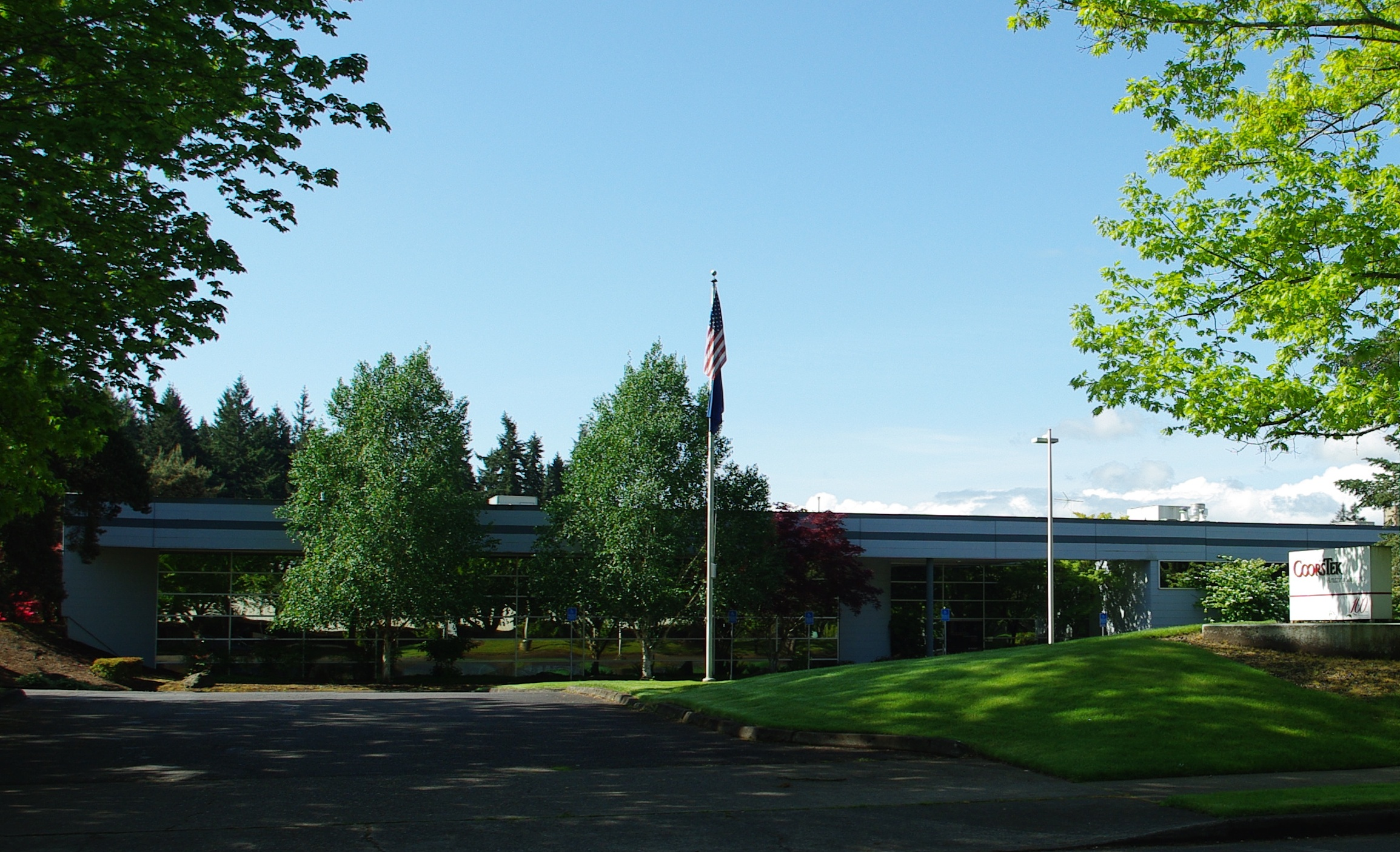
Facility in Hillsboro, Oregon

=== Subsidiaries and Outlying Operations ===
Benton, Arkansas, US	Formerly Alumina Ceramics, Inc. Alumina and reaction-bonded SiC seal rings.
Fremont, California, US	Formerly Liberty Machine Inc.
Vista, California, US	Formerly BAE Systems and Cercom Inc.
Arvada, Colorado, US	CoorsTek Specialty Chemicals; formerly Boulder Ionics.
Golden, Colorado, US - 9th & Washington	Alumina and porcelain lab wares.
Golden, Colorado, US - Denver West, McIntyre and N. Table Mtn.	Headquarters, R&D, HIP, injection moulding.
Golden, Colorado, US - Clear Creek Valley Plant	Analytical lab, tape-cast substrates, metallizing.
Golden, Colorado, US	Outlast Technologies LLC. Temperature-regulating textiles.
Grand Junction, Colorado, US	Formerly C5 Medical Werks, now the Bioceramics part of CoorsTek Medical LLC.
Grand Junction, Colorado, US	Thick-film 96% alumina substrates, fiber-optic ferrules, micro-extrusions.^{,}
East Granby, Connecticut, US	Formerly Norton Co. Si_{3}N_{4} bearings.
Lexington, Kentucky, US	Avon Protection. Body and aircraft armor. Acquired in 2023.
Worcester, Massachusetts, US	Originally Norton Emery Wheel Co.
Milford, New Hampshire, US	Formerly Norton Co. PbMgNbO_{3} igniters.
Oklahoma City, Oklahoma, US	Formerly RI Ceramic Co. of Norman, OK, and HB Co. Alumina pump components.
Tulsa, Oklahoma, US	Tulsa Machine Works & Manufacturing
Hillsboro, Oregon, US	Formerly Wilbanks, Inc. Alumina tooling for paper mills and metrology.
Oak Ridge, Tennessee, US	Formerly Coors Technical Ceramics Co.
Austin, Houston, US and Odessa, TX	Petrochemical, oil and gas hardware and services.
Salt Lake City, Utah, US	Ceramatec, Inc.
Edmonton, Alberta, Canada	Petrochemical, oil and gas hardware
Cambridge, ON, Canada	BLS Textiles, Inc.
London, Ontario, Canada	Formerly Advance Manufacturing Technologies ULC (AMT)
Ottawa, Ontario, Canada	DEW Engineering and Development Ltd.
Paris, Ontario, Canada	CoorsTek Advanced Ceramics Hamilton ULC, foundry filters, formerly Hamilton Pottery Co.
Tampere, Finland	CoorsTek Sensors; formerly Pegasor, Oy.
Bindlach, Bavaria, Germany	ANCeram GmbH & Co. KG^{,}
Lauf an der Pegnitz, Bavaria, Germany	Formerly Stettner & Co. GmbH. Steatite «(MgO)_{3}(SiO_{2})_{4}» products.
Mönchengladbach, North Rhine-Westphalia, Germany	Formerly Carborundum Abrasives.
Oguno, Yamagata; Hatano, Kanagawa; and Kariya, Aichi, Japan	Formerly Covalent Materials Corp., Toshiba Ceramics Co. Electronic ceramics, R&D and refractories.
Tokyo; Tokuyama, Yamaguchi; and Nagasaki, Japan	Formerly Saint-Gobain. Japan HQ, quartz glass and photomask substrates.
Gumi City, Korea	CoorsTek Korea
Kyungbook, Korea	Formerly Doo Young Semitek Co., Ltd.
Seongnam, Korea	Motor actuator assemblies.
San Luis Potosí, Mexico	Formerly Saint-Gobain. Inspection and assembly of igniters and silicon nitride bearings.
Uden, Netherlands	Formerly the ceramics operation of Philips. European R&D center.
Robertsfors, Sweden	Large-scale silicon nitride balls.
Rayong, Thailand	CoorsTek Advanced Materials (Thailand) Co., Ltd., a 400,000-ft^{2} factory that opened in 2022.^{,}^{,}
Crewe, Cheshire, England, UK	Dynamic-Ceramic Ltd. Petrochemical, oil and gas hardware.
New Mills, England, UK	Flowguard hydro-pneumatic pressure vessels, pulsation dampeners, suction stabilizers and surge absorbers.
Turnov, Czech Republic	Substrates / Armour. Formerly Saint Gobain

=== Former subsidiaries ===
Alpha Optical Systems Inc.	Ocean Springs, Mississippi, US	Spinel radomes
Ceram Corp.^{,}	El Cajon, California, US	Grinding wheels
Ceramicon Designs Ltd.^{,}	Golden, Colorado, US	Ceramic golf club heads
Cercom, Inc.^{,} (Re-acquired as BAE in 2011.)	Vista, California, US	Body armor, helicopter seat plating and ceramic heaters
Coban Industrial Ltda. (Moved to Vinhedo in 2004, re-acquired as part of S-G in 2010.)	Rio Claro, SP, Brazil	Pulp and paper tooling
Coors Biomedical Co.	Lakewood, Colorado, US	Dental crowns
Coors Ceramics Asia-Pacific Pte. Ltd.	Singapore	Electronic ceramics
Coors Ceramics UK, Ltd.	Glenrothes, Fife, Scotland, UK	Thick- and thin-film substrates. CoorsTek's first foreign subsidiary, in 1981. Formerly VZS-Seagoe Advanced Ceramics Ltd.
Coors Components, Inc. (Sold in 1987.)	Broomfield, Colorado, US	Capacitors
Coors Electronic Package Co.^{,}	Chattanooga, Tennessee, US	CERDIPs
Coors Optical Systems Co.	Golden, Colorado, US	Spinel radomes
CoorsTek Medical LLC. Formerly IMDS.	Fort Worth, Texas, US	Medical implants
Gaiser Precision Bonding Tools (Closed in 2019.)	Ventura, California, US	Ceramic capillaries and nozzles
Humphreys Investment Co.	Denver, Colorado, US	Spiral separators
MicroLithics Corp.^{,} (Sold to VisiSub Inc. in 1994.)	Golden, Colorado, US	Multilayer interconnect boards for military hardware
Resistant Materials Systems, Inc./Coors Wear Products, Inc.	Lawrence, Pennsylvania, US	Tile linings
Royal Worcester Industrial Ceramics, Ltd.	Tonyrefail, Wales	
Tetrafluor Inc.	El Segundo, California, US	Seals and bearings

=== Alumina Ceramics, Inc. ===
Robert L. Johnson founded Alumina Ceramics, Inc. (ACI) in Benton, Arkansas, in 1971. Johnson had been a ceramic engineer and project director at the Alumina Research Division of Reynolds Metals Co. in nearby Bauxite, Arkansas. One of ACI's first products was Saphrox 99.7% Al_{2}O_{3} grinding media. Johnson left ACI in 1974 to work for Motorola in Phoenix, Arizona, and was succeeded by Ken Holiman. Coors bought ACI in 1976, mostly for the seal ring specialty ACI had developed, and eventually moved most of its alumina and SiC seal operations to Arkansas. Coors built a second factory on Boone Road. In 2019, CoorsTek invested $26 million and added 50,000 ft^{2} to the 180,000 ft^{2}, 200-employee Arkansas operation, in anticipation of growth in its aerospace and defense markets.

=== Ceramatec, Inc. ===
Ceramatec was founded in Salt Lake City in 1976 by University of Utah Professors Ronald S. Gordon, Al Sossin and Anil V. Virkar, to develop liquid-core, sodium-sulfur batteries for automotive applications. Gordon was the first president. The battery uses a beta-alumina solid electrolyte (BASE) ceramic membrane to separate the sulfur anode and sodium cathode. Donald L. Heath, a former Coors Porcelain employee, became president in 1985 and moved the company to a larger building. David W. Richerson, author of Modern Ceramic Engineering (2nd Ed., Marcel Dekker Inc., 1992), was hired in 1985 and became the VP for applied technology until he left in 1992. Ceramatec was bought by Elkem Metals Co., from a 10% stake in 1982 to full ownership in 1989. Petter Oygarden of Elkem became the president in 1989 and guided the company to profitability by 1992, when Ceramatec had 120 employees and $12M in revenue.

Ashok V. Joshi, an expert in solid oxide fuel cells (SOFC) and the VP, bought the company from Elkem in 1999 and became president in 2000. Joshi won the Utah Governor's Medal for Science and Technology in 2003, and the IRI Achievement Award in 2010. CoorsTek acquired the 165-employee operation in 2008 to be one of its R&D centers, with Joshi continuing as interim president and D.M. "Doug" Coors (son of Joe Jr.) as manager of R&D and later president. CoorsTek launched a joint venture with Innovate! Technology in Ladera Ranch, CA, in 2009, EmiSense Technologies LLC, to commercialize emissions sensors developed by Ceramatec. A new subsidiary, CoorsTek Membrane Sciences AS, was launched in Oslo, Norway, in 2015 to commercialize BASE, SOFC and other ion-separating technologies developed by Ceramatec, under the direction of Per Christian Vestre. ^{,}

=== Coors Biomedical Company ===
Coors Biomedical Co., a 35-employee Porcelain subsidiary founded in 1980 in nearby Lakewood, Colorado, developed a low-shrinkage, high-alumina porcelain for dental restorations in the early 1980s, that could be fitted and fabricated in the dentist's office. The product, sold under the name Cerestore, raised some concerns among dentists for its wear on opposing teeth and its accuracy of fit.^{,} Coors Biomedical was also developing synthetic bone-grafting technologies. The technology became the property of Johnson & Johnson after Coors Biomedical closed in the late 1980s.

=== Coors Ceramics U.K., Ltd. ===
Coors Porcelain opened its first foreign subsidiary, Coors Ceramics UK Ltd. (CCUK), in the Southfield Industrial Estate in Glenrothes, Fife, Scotland, in 1981. A key function of the site was to act as the sales and marketing facility for the European market. CCUK grew when Porcelain acquired Royal Worcester Industrial Ceramics Ltd. in Wales in 1984. Former CoorsTek President Derek C. Johnson began his Coors career as an electrical engineer at CCUK in 1984. CCUK was reorganized in 1988 as Coors Ceramics Electronics Ltd. (CCEL), with product lines mostly similar to those of the Coors plant in Grand Junction, namely roll-compacted, laser-drilled, thick-film 96% alumina substrates for hybrid circuits. CCEL added 99.6% alumina thin-film substrates in 1991. CCEL received the Queen's Award for Export Achievement in 1992, for its record exports of lasered ceramic substrates. CCEL acquired neighboring property in late 1992 and tripled its manufacturing operations to 30,000 sq ft (2,800 m^{2}).

VZS/Seagoe Advanced Ceramics Ltd. made ceramic products in Glenrothes, including stand-off insulators, switch gears, circuit breakers, ball valves, pump shafts and bearings, trays and boiler ferrules. Its products were used in semiconductor, defense, chemical, laser, electrical, textile, and paper applications. Seagoe began as George Wade & Sons Ltd. in Portadown, County Armagh, Northern Ireland. In December 1994, W. Laurie Hoskisson led the management buyout of VZS Technical Ceramics Ltd. from the Cookson Group and was appointed managing director. Hoskisson helped negotiate the merger of VZS Technical Ceramics of Glenrothes with Seagoe Advanced Ceramics of Craigavon, Northern Ireland, in January 1998. The Irish factory closed in 2002. CCEL acquired its 4000-m^{2} neighbor and competitor, managed by Hoskisson, from Beauford plc in 2006. Hoskisson worked for CCUK beginning in 1981 as Production Manager, before he was hired by VZS. In 2017, the 70-employee operation, managed by Mark Cameron, signed a contract to manufacture ceramic components for Teledyne e2v's radiotherapy machines. The Glenrothes operations closed permanently on 29 May 2021, due in part to Brexit and the COVID-19 pandemic.

=== Coors Technical Ceramics Company ===
Coors built a $1–2M, 2800–3700 m^{2} factory in Oak Ridge, TN, in early 1990, known as Coors Technical Ceramics Company (CTCC). The 40-employee Oak Ridge plant was considered an extension of Coors' Oklahoma subsidiary, R.I. Ceramic Co., with William A. "Woodie" Howe (1942–2006) managing both operations and reporting to John Jenkins, VP and GM of Coors Ceramics Structural Division. Some unspecified Y-12 product lines from Cercom in Vista, CA, were moved to Oak Ridge, along with key employees from Norman. The Tennessee location was chosen to take advantage of the technology transfer programs at Oak Ridge National Laboratory's High Temperature Materials Lab. Howe, a Coors employee from 1962 to 1999, was promoted to VP of the Structural Products Group in 1996, which included CTCC operations in Tennessee, Oklahoma, California and Texas, and ACI in Arkansas. Later in 1996, CTCC acquired HB Company Inc., a manufacturer of petrochemical pump components, giving CTCC additional facilities in Oklahoma City, Odessa, Texas, and Red Deer, Alberta.

=== CoorsTek Medical LLC ===
A growing demand for ceramic implantable medical devices led J.B. "Brad" Coors (son of Joe Jr.) to open C5 Medical Werks Inc. in western Colorado in 2005 next to CoorsTek's Grand Junction factory that opened in 1975. CoorsTek acquired Fort Worth-based Innovative Medical Device Solutions in 2013, and merged the two to create 400-employee CoorsTek Medical LLC, under the direction of Jonathan Coors, son of John. CoorsTek Medical had operations in Chandler, Arizona, Vandalia, Ohio, Molalla, Oregon, Logan, Utah and Providence, Utah, in addition to Texas and Colorado. Products included artificial joints, components for medical machines and implantable screws, rods and plates. The 88,000-ft^{2} former IMDS Vandalia site in suburban Dayton was the largest CoorsTek Medical location with 200 employees.

The 12-employee, 9000-ft^{2} Chandler site in suburban Phoenix, begun by IMDS in 2006, was primarily a prototype design and construction operation. The former C5MW site produced components for hip and knee joints, disc replacements in spine surgery, seeds for brachytherapy, cochlear implants, neuro-stimulators, neuro-sensors and crowns, bridges, abutments and implants for dental applications. The Colorado plant added ceramic injection molding capabilities in 2008. CoorsTek Medical was sold to UnitedCoatings Group of Italy in July 2019, and renamed Lincotek Medical S.p.A.

=== R.I. Ceramic Company ===
Francis "Frank" Maginnis (1925–2018) left the University of Oklahoma Physics Dept. machine shop to start Research Instrument Company in Norman, Oklahoma, in 1958 to produce components for oil-field pumps.^{,} In 1966, Maginnis developed a way of making alumina pump plungers for the oil and gas industries, replacing steel and other metals that corroded too easily. Sales grew over the next eight years at a rate of 70-80% per year. The company was acquired by Coors Porcelain in 1975, primarily for the product line of ceramic plungers used in reciprocating pumps in secondary oil recovery processes, and ceramic ball valves.

Coors renamed the company R.I. Ceramic Company in 1978. The acquisition gave Coors product lines that would have cost ~ten times as much to develop, and an inventory of products to address buyers' immediate needs. Before the acquisition, the delivery time in Golden for ceramic pump components was months, whereas with R.I. it was closer to a week. Woodie Howe was promoted from the metallizing department supervisor in Golden to president of R.I. in 1980. R.I. had about 40 employees in the mid-1980s. Former CoorsTek chief operating officer J. Mark Chenoweth began his Coors career as a machinist at R.I. in 1986. The 1996 acquisition of HB Company's newer operation in Oklahoma City led to closure of the plant in Norman and its relocation to the state capital.

=== Wilbanks International, Inc. ===
William H. Wilbanks (1927–2006), Tom Stuart and Frank C. Erzen founded Wilbanks Inc. in 1963 in Hillsboro, OR, to manufacture ceramic components for the pulp and paper industries. The components included suction box covers, foil sections, Versafoil forming tables and cleaning cones. The plant was originally located at 26900 S. W. Tualatin Valley Hwy. in Hillsboro, before moving to its present site in the Hawthorn Farm Industrial Park on 53rd Ave. Coors Porcelain acquired 40-employee Wilbanks in 1973, and modified its new subsidiary's name to Wilbanks International, Inc. Bill Wilbanks remained as president until 1980, while Coors employees G.G. Grimes and Shepard Sweeney were named VP & GM and secretary-treasurer, respectively. Coors president R.D. Whiting became the chairman of the executive committee.

Joe Coors Jr. was a quality engineer at Wilbanks 1973-84 and served as president 1980–84. Dean Rulis was the president of Wilbanks 1984–92. Bill Wilbanks, a ceramic engineer at Tektronix in Portland before he started his namesake firm, managed the 170-employee Coban plant in Brazil in the mid-1980s until his retirement from Coors. Erzen, also a former Tektronix engineer, served as engineering manager of Coban beginning in 1981. CoorsTek sold its paper machine drainage elements operations in Hillsboro to the Coldwater Group in 2017. Coldwater moved the equipment to its Atlanta facility, but still gets its ceramic components from CoorsTek.

== Presidents ==
- Adolph Coors I (1915–1929)
- Adolph Coors II (1929–1946)
- Joseph Coors Sr. (1946–1972)
- Robert Derald Whiting (1972–1985)
- Joseph Coors Jr. (1985–1992, 1997–2000)
- James Wade (1992–1997)
- John K. Coors (2000–2004)
- Derek C. Johnson (2004–2005)
- John K. Coors (2005–2020)
