= Adolph Coors (disambiguation) =

Adolph Coors (1847–1929) was a German-American brewer.

Adolph Coors may also refer to:

- Adolph Coors II (1884–1970), businessman
- Adolph Coors III (1915–1960), kidnapping victim

== See also ==
- Adolph Coors Company
- Adolph Coors Foundation
