= Joseph Coors =

Chemical engineer, conservative activist

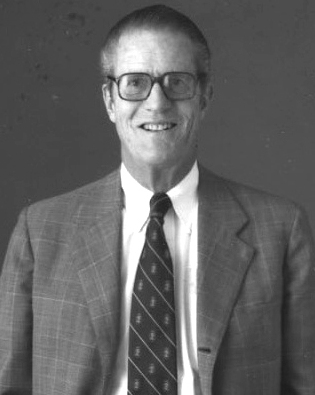
- Coors in 1983
- Born: November 12, 1917; Golden, Colorado, U.S.
- Died: March 15, 2003 (aged 85); Rancho Mirage, California, U.S.
- Resting place: El Camino Memorial Park, Sorrento Valley, California, U.S.
- Employer: Coors Brewing Company
- Spouse: Holly Coors (m. 1941; div. 1987)
- Children: 5, including Pete
- Parent: Adolph Coors II (father)
- Relatives: Adolph Coors (grandfather); Adolph Coors III (brother); William Coors (brother)

Joseph Coors Sr. (November 12, 1917 – March 15, 2003), was the grandson of brewer Adolph Coors and president of Coors Brewing Company.

== Early life and education ==
Coors was born on November 12, 1917, in Golden, Colorado, to Alice May Kistler (1885–1970) and Adolph Coors II. His two older brothers were Adolph Coors III, born in 1915, and William Coors, born in 1916.

Coors attended Cornell University, where he graduated in 1939 with a Bachelor of Science degree in chemical engineering. Two years later, in 1940, Coors earned his master's degree at Cornell. As a Cornell University student, his brother, Adolph Coors III, and his cousin, Dallas Morse Coors, were his classmates, and all three were inducted into both Kappa Alpha Society and the Quill and Dagger honor society at the university.

== Career ==
After graduation, he began work in the Coors Porcelain Co., the business that helped the company survive Prohibition. With his brother William (their desks were located only one foot apart), Joseph refined the cold-filtered beer manufacturing system and began America's first large-scale recycling program by offering one-cent returns on Coors aluminum cans. He served one term as a regent of the University of Colorado from 1967 to 1972 and attempted to quell what he considered to be campus radicalism during the Vietnam War. He was president of Coors from 1977 to 1985 and as chief operating officer from 1980 to 1988.

Brewery Workers Local 366 in Golden, Colorado, struck the Coors plant in August 1977. Coors continued brewery operations and replaced the striking workers who stayed out. The new workers voted to decertify the union in December 1978, officially ending the strike. The strike and decertification caused a 10-year boycott of Coors by the AFL-CIO. In the aftermath of the strike, Coors required new employees to take lie detector tests, which were discontinued in August 1986.

In 1977, after a regional agreement prevented the movement of toxic aluminum waste from aluminum can production across adjacent state borders, Coors set up the Mountain States Legal Foundation, headed by local lawyer James G. Watt, to fight the environmental constraints in the courts. Watt later became U.S. Secretary of the Interior, and appointed local attorney Anne M. Gorsuch as head of the Environmental Protection Agency to dismantle toxic waste disposal laws, causing an outcry that got her sacked by President Ronald Reagan after 22 months, after which Watt was forced to resign for politically insensitive remarks.

Coors was also known to have privately donated $65,000 to buy a light cargo plane for the Contras' effort in Nicaragua during Reagan's presidency. That donation went through National Security Council adviser Oliver North.

=== Politics ===
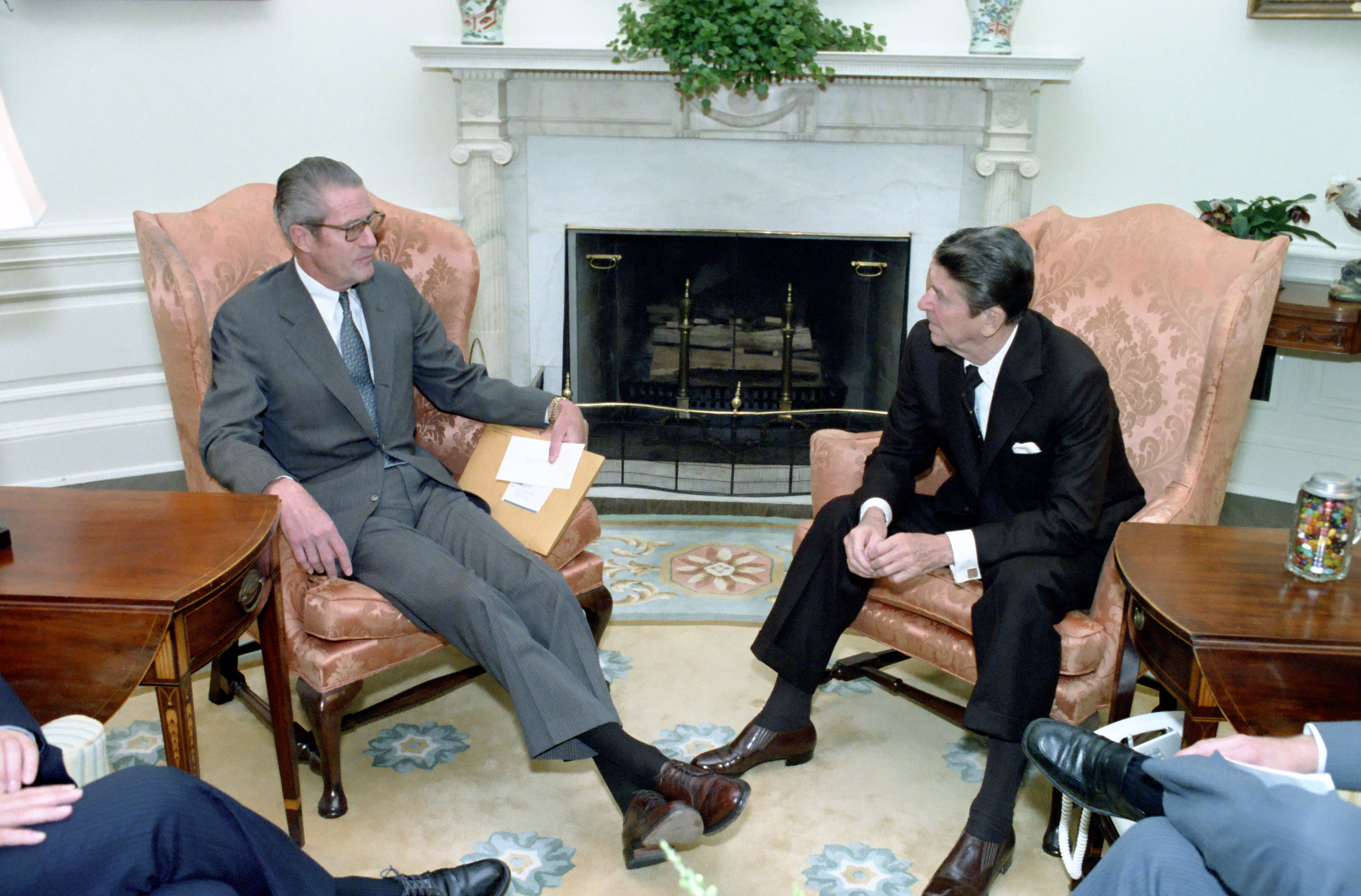
Coors with President Ronald Reagan in 1981

Coors was perhaps best known for his hard-right politics and his support of Barry Goldwater and Ronald Reagan, whom he first met in Palm Springs, California in 1967. His brother William once described him as "a little bit right of Attila the Hun". A founding member of The Heritage Foundation, a Washington, D.C.–based think tank, in 1973 along with Paul Weyrich and Edwin Feulner Coors provided $250,000 to cover its first year budget and $300,000 annually thereafter. He was also involved with the founding of the Free Congress Research and Education Foundation, the Council for National Policy, and Television News Inc., a syndicated news service for television stations. He was a member of Ronald Reagan's Kitchen Cabinet after helping finance Reagan's political career as governor of California and U.S. president, and was later nominated by Reagan to sit on the board of the Corporation for Public Broadcasting.

== Marriage ==
Coors married Edith Holland "Holly" Hanson (Holly Coors) (1920–2009) in 1941. They had five sons: Joseph "Joe Jr." (1942–2016), Jeffrey "Jeff" (born 1945), Peter "Pete" (born 1946), Grover (born c. 1950) and John (born c. 1956).

In the 1980s, all five sons described themselves as born-again Christians.

Coors divorced Holly in 1987 after 46 years of marriage. His son Jeff described him as an adulterer and a sinner. He married Anne Elizabeth Drotning in 1988.

=== Sons of Joe and Holly ===
- Joseph Coors Jr. (1942–2016) began college at the University of North Carolina, but transferred to North Carolina State University, where he earned a B.Sc. in mathematics in 1964. His marriage at age 19 to Gail Fambrough, and avoidance of Cornell University, caused a schism in the family, and he was not offered employment at any of the Coors companies upon graduation from NCSU. Joe Jr. worked as a stockbroker in Denver until 1967, when he joined Frontier Airlines as a programmer in data processing. He left Frontier in 1969 to work for a school district in San Diego as a systems analyst. In 1972, he chose to return home and reconcile with his father. The reconciliation came slowly, but Joe Jr. was hired by Coors Porcelain Co. in the data processing department. He was transferred to the Wilbanks subsidiary in Oregon in 1977, where he became president in 1980. Although his relationship with his father remained icy, Joe Jr. returned to Golden in 1984 to replace a retiring VP and be groomed to succeed the ailing Derald Whiting as president of Coors Porcelain (later CoorsTek). Joe Jr. was appointed to the Colorado School of Mines (CSM) Board of Trustees by Gov. Roy Romer, serving 1991–99. The softball field and an annual golf outing at CSM are named in his honor. Long after his 2000 retirement from CoorsTek, Joe Jr. ran for Congress as a Republican in Colorado's 7th congressional district against his longtime neighbor, Democratic incumbent Ed Perlmutter in 2012. Perlmutter was re-elected, but remained friends with Joe, Jr. until the latter's death from a stroke in 2016.^{,}
- Jeffrey Holland Coors (born 1945), developer of Coors Light beer, was named president of Adolph Coors Co. in 1985 and later as president of 1993 Coors spin-off ACX Technologies, Inc. Jeff became the chairman and president of ACX subsidiary Graphic Packaging Corp. in 1997. He retired as vice-chairman from GPC in 2007, and resigned from its board of directors in 2016.
- Peter Hanson Coors (born 1946) earned a B.Sc. in industrial engineering at Cornell University in 1969 and an M.B.A. at the University of Denver in 1970. He was hired by Adolph Coors Co. in 1971, and was named President of the Brewing Division in 1985, reporting to his brother Jeff. Pete was named Chairman of both Adolph Coors Company and its largest subsidiary, Coors Brewing Company, in 2002. He was also vice-chairman of Molson Coors Brewing Company and chairman of MillerCoors.
- William Grover Coors (born 1951) is chief scientist and a member of the board of directors at CoorsTek Membrane Sciences AS in Oslo, Norway. He earned a bachelor's degree at Stanford University and an M.Sc. in 1996 and Ph.D. in materials science at CSM in 2001. In addition to CoorsTek, Grover has been an executive at Adolph Coors Co. in Washington, DC, and Microlithics Corp.
- John Kistler Coors (born 1956) began his career as a quality control technician at the Coors brewery when he was 17. His goal was to work his way up through the brewery, where he led the customer satisfaction division in 1988. The 1992 ACX spin-off sent John, then 36, to a small operation in ACX. In 1996, he was assigned to manage the $17 million investment in Golden Genesis, which was sold for $30 million to Kyocera in 1999. John was appointed president of Coors Ceramics Co. in 1998 and chairman (succeeding Joe Jr.) in 2000 when the company was renamed CoorsTek. He retired from CoorsTek in 2020.

Joe Sr. and Holly had 28 grandchildren, and 24 great-grandchildren at the time of Holly's death in 2009.

== Death ==
Coors died in Rancho Mirage, California, on March 15, 2003, after a three-month battle with lymphatic cancer.
