= Herman Coors House =

Historic house in Colorado, United States

- U.S. National Register of Historic Places
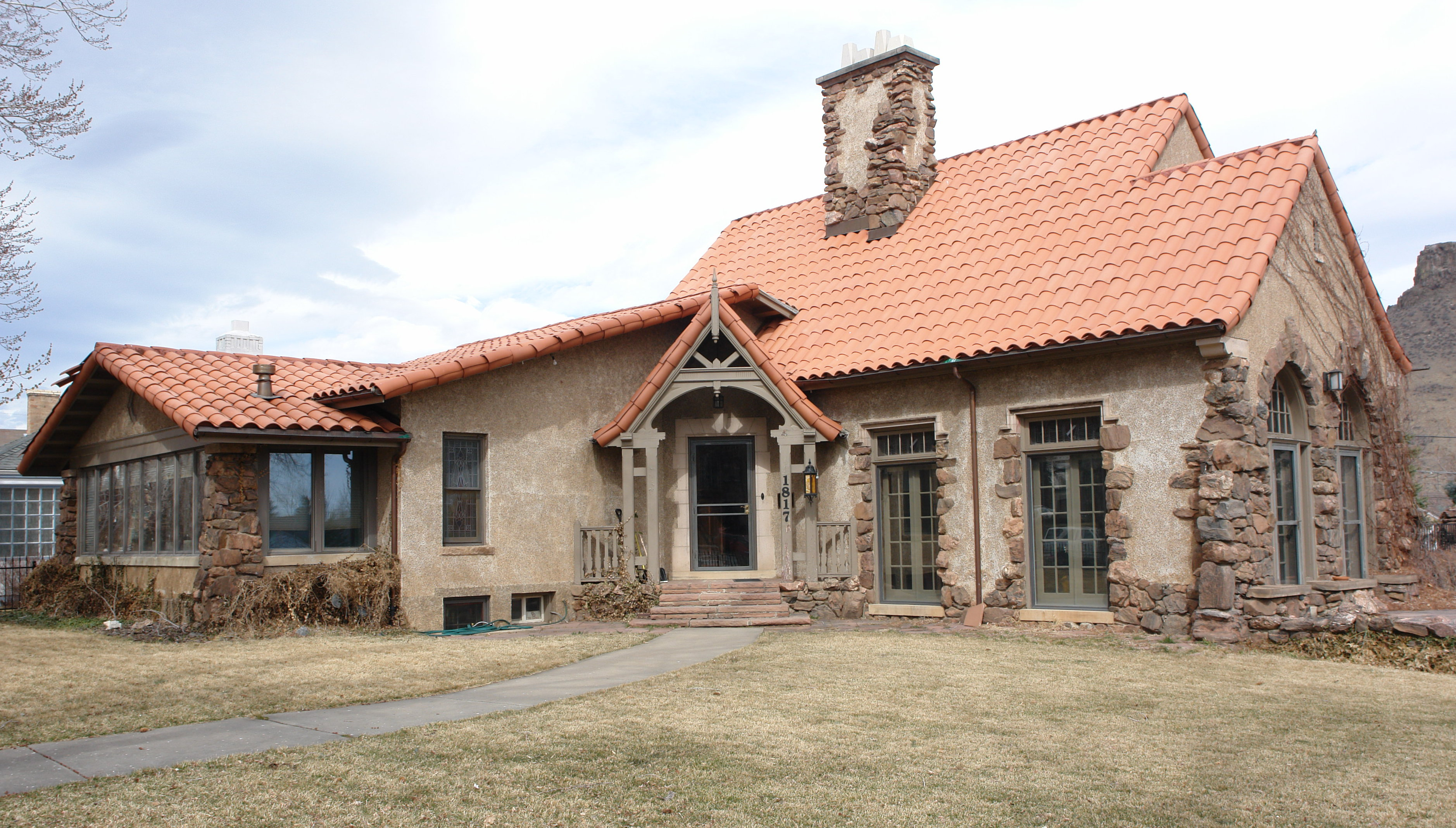
- Herman Coors House

- Location within Colorado Location within the United States
- Location: 1817 Arapahoe St., Golden, Colorado
- Coordinates: 39°44′58″N 105°13′01″W
- Area: less than one acre
- Built: 1915
- Architect: Jacques Benedict (1917 renovation)
- Architectural style: Tudor Revival, Late 19th and Early 20th Century American Movements, Rustic
- NRHP reference No.: 97001227
- Added to NRHP: October 17, 1997

The Herman Coors House, in Golden, Colorado, was the home of Herman Frederick Coors (1890-1967). It was originally built as a modest bungalow in 1915 by Elmer Johnson, who in 1934 built the brewhouse of the Coors Brewery. In 1917 the house was purchased by Coors, third son of Adolph Coors, who hired architect Jacques Benedict to transform it into a Tudor Revival style home, with a wooden arch front door canopy and stone terracing. Coors was the manager of the Coors Porcelain Company, and in 1921 moved to Inglewood, California where he established the H.F. Coors China Company to manufacture porcelain dishware. The house was then purchased by banker Edward A. Phinney, who owned the Rubey National Bank in Golden. He built a companion cottage and barn behind the house in 1928. His fortunes took a downturn during the Bank Holiday of the Great Depression, when he lost much of his fortune. Since then the home has remained well preserved.

The house was listed on the National Register of Historic Places in 1997. Its modification and expansion by Denver architect Jacques Benedict was completed in 1919.

== See also ==
- National Register of Historic Places listings in Jefferson County, Colorado
