= William Coors =

American brewer (1916–2018)

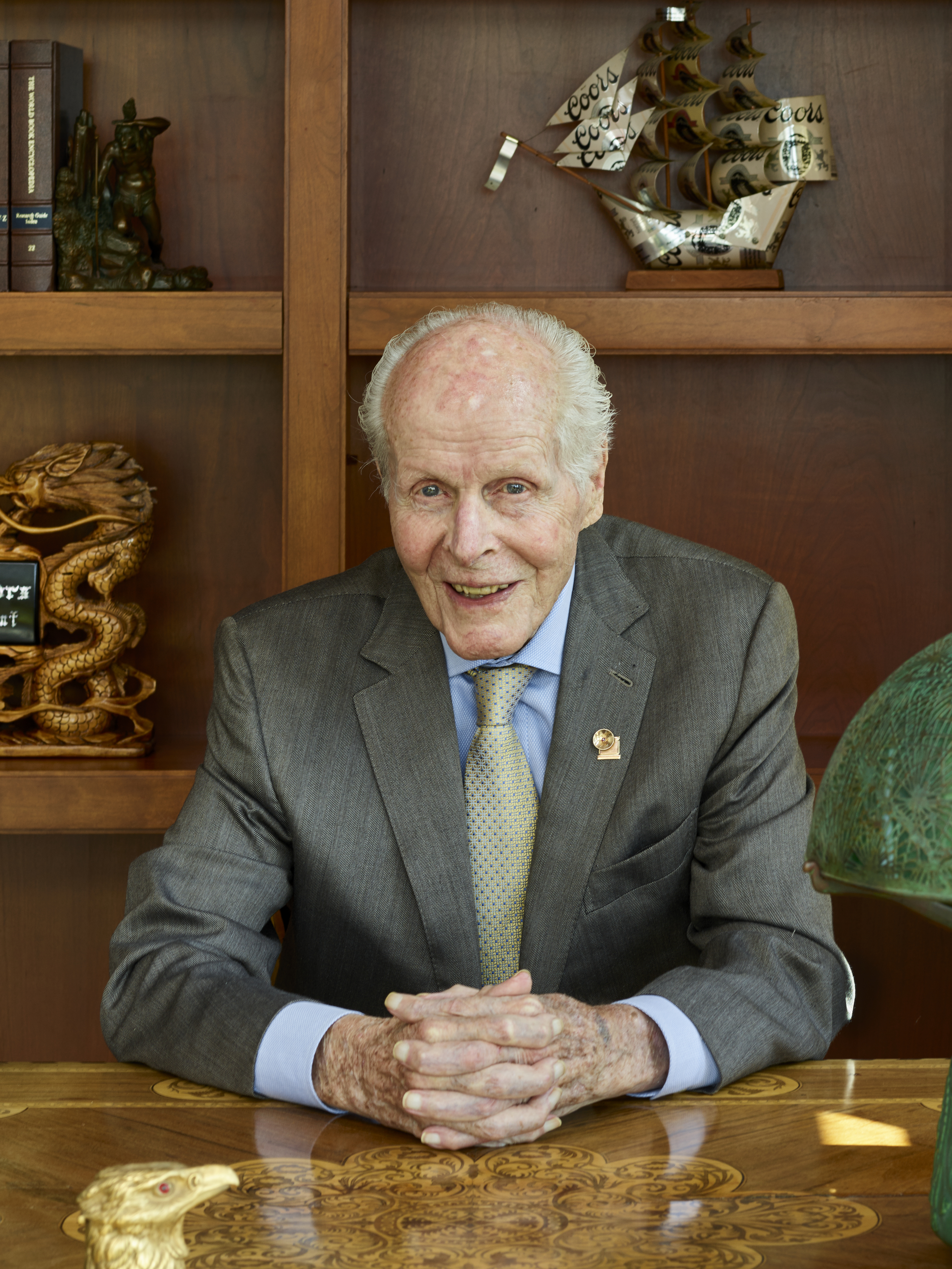
- Coors in 2016
- Born: William Kistler Coors; August 11, 1916; Golden, Colorado, U.S.
- Died: October 13, 2018 (aged 102); Golden, Colorado, U.S.
- Education: Phillips Exeter Academy; Princeton University
- Known for: Chairman of the Coors Brewing Company (1959–2000)
- Spouses: Geraldine Louise Jackson (m. 1941; div. 1962); Phyllis Mahaffey (m. 1963, divorced); Rita Bass (m. 1995; died 2015)
- Children: 3
- Father: Adolph Coors II
- Relatives: Adolph Coors (grandfather); Adolph Coors III (brother); Joseph Coors (brother)

William Kistler Coors (August 11, 1916 – October 13, 2018) was an American brewery executive with the Coors Brewing Company. He was affiliated with the company for over 64 years, and was a board member from 1973 to 2003. He was a grandson of Adolph Coors (1847–1929), the company's founder.

== Biography ==
Born in Golden, Colorado, on August 11, 1916, he was the son of Adolph Coors II and Alice May Kistler (1885–1970), and the brother of Adolph Coors III (1915–1960) and Joseph Coors Sr. (1917–2003). Coors earned a bachelor's degree from Princeton University in 1938, and a master's degree in chemical engineering in 1939.

Coors had three daughters with his first wife Geraldine, who suffered from alcoholism and died of illness. William remarried in the 1960s and he and his wife, Phyllis, had one son, Scott. Coors' oldest daughter Geraldine committed suicide on August 5, 1983, at the age of 40 after suffering from depression.

Coors climbed Mount Kilimanjaro in 1974 at age 58, as part of his pursuit of physical and spiritual health in the 1970s. The experience inspired him to establish the Coors Wellness Center for employees and retirees of Adolph Coors Co. in a former grocery store building just outside the brewery property in 1981.

Coors turned 100 in August 2016 and died on October 13, 2018, aged 102.

== Career ==
William Coors entered the family business as a chemical engineer for Coors Brewing Company in 1939.

Coors was respected in the industry for his ability in packaging, bottling, and engineering. He is credited with pioneering the recyclable two-piece aluminum can, which is now standard throughout the industry. In the 1950s, Coors requested $250,000 from his father, CEO Adolph Coors II, to build an experimental line of aluminum cans. By the early 1960s, can recycling was viable, and the company offered customers a one-cent deposit on returned cans.

Coors was elected to the board of directors in 1973. When the non-brewing assets (e.g., Coors Ceramics Co.) of Adolph Coors Co. were spun off in 1992 as ACX Technologies Inc., he served as chairman of both companies.

In 2003, at the age of 87, Coors retired from the boards of the Adolph Coors Company and the Coors Brewing Company, although he remained with the company as chief technical adviser.

== Political views ==
Coors' political views were considered to be more moderate and less outspoken than his brother Joe's. For example, Joe's public opposition to the Equal Rights Amendment in 1988 earned the company the ire of feminist groups, even though William was on record supporting the amendment.

=== Accusations of racism ===
Coors was criticized for remarks he made on February 23, 1984, in a seminar held by the Minority Business Development Center in Denver. In off-the-cuff remarks, he stated that "ancestors were dragged here in chains against their will. … I would urge those of you who feel that way to go back to where your ancestors came from, and you will find out that probably the greatest favor that anybody ever did you was to drag your ancestors over here in chains, and I mean it." He also remarked Africa's economic problems stemmed from "a lack of intellectual capacity."

Coors apologized in a press conference the next day for his "unfortunate choice of words and lack of sensitivity," and said he hoped his commitment to minority groups spoke louder than his words. He stated that his words were taken out of context by the Rocky Mountain News, which he later sued for libel. A number of people who attended the speech reported that the remarks were not considered offensive. An informal boycott of Coors was announced by the NAACP during a March 2 meeting in Los Angeles. At the time, the AFL–CIO had been boycotting the company for seven years over a labor dispute. At least 500 liquor stores in Southern California joined the NAACP boycott, which was suspended five days later when they reached an agreement with the company. In September, the Adolph Coors Company signed an agreement with Operation PUSH and the NAACP to invest $325 million into black communities over five years, to deposit millions of operating capital in black-owned banks, and to spend $8.8 million on advertising in black-owned media. In October, the company negotiated a similar agreement with American GI Forum and La Raza for $300 million. This was the first ever such arrangement between La Raza and any corporation.

In 1987, Coors dropped his libel suit after the Rocky Mountain News printed an article commending Coors' good record with the minority community, and expressing regret for the headline over the February 24, 1984 article.

== Positions held ==
- President – Coors Brewing Company
- Chairman – Coors Brewing Company
- President – Castle Rock Foundation
- Founding Member – The Future 500
- Honorary Chairman – SEED
- Trustee – Colorado School of Mines
