= Valley Metal Container =

Aluminum can production plant

Valley Metal Container (VMC), a joint venture between the Coors Brewing Company and American National Can Company, operates the world's largest single-site facility for aluminum can production. Located in Golden, Colorado, the plant manufactures over 4 billion cans per year on six production lines.
