= Adolph Coors II =

American businessman (1884–1970)

- Born: Adolph Herman Joseph Coors Jr. January 12, 1884; Golden, Colorado, U.S.
- Died: June 28, 1970 (aged 86); Golden, Colorado, U.S.
- Education: Cornell University
- Spouse: Alice May Kistler (m. 1912)
- Children: 4, including Adolph III, William, Joseph
- Father: Adolph Coors

Adolph Herman Joseph Coors Jr. (January 12, 1884 – June 28, 1970) was an American businessman. The second president of Coors Brewing Company, he was the son of Louisa (Webber) and brewer Adolph Coors.

== Life and career ==
Born January 12, 1884, in Golden, Colorado, Coors was a graduate of Cornell University, where he was a member of the Sphinx Head Society and the Kappa Alpha Society. He became an accomplished chemist who worked in prominent positions in the family's brewing and porcelain operations. He married Alice May Kistler (1885–1970) of Denver on May 4, 1912, at the Kistler home by Rev. Van Arsdall. The couple had four children: Adolph Coors III (1915–1960) who was kidnapped and killed in 1960; William K. Coors (1916–2018), Joseph Coors (1917–2003), and May Louise Coors (1923–2008).

Coors had his own brush with kidnapping in 1934. Paul Robert Lane, the former state Prohibition agent for Colorado, and Clyde Culbertson, former investigator for the federal dry forces, along with two other men conspired to kidnap Adolph Jr. for a ransom of $50,000. The person delivering the money was to proceed to three different checkpoints to ensure no officers were tailing him and then split the money; Coors would be released somewhere around Colorado Springs. Denver police learned of the plot while working on an auto theft ring and Adolph Jr. volunteered to be kidnapped so the police could arrest the suspects. However, Lane was arrested on an auto theft charge and the conspiracy was foiled in advance.

Coors died on June 28, 1970, aged 86, in Golden.
