= Anil Virkar =

American materials scientist and engineer

Anil Vasudeo Virkar is an American materials scientist and engineer, currently Distinguished Professor at University of Utah. He is a Fellow of the ASM International.

== Publications ==
- Kim, Jai-Woh (1999). "Polarization Effects in Intermediate Temperature, Anode-Supported Solid Oxide Fuel Cells". Journal of the Electrochemical Society. 146 (1): 69–78. Bibcode:1999JElS..146...69K. doi:10.1149/1.1391566.
- Chevalier, Jérôme; Gremillard, Laurent; Virkar, Anil V.; Clarke, David R. (2009). "The Tetragonal-Monoclinic Transformation in Zirconia: Lessons Learned and Future Trends". Journal of the American Ceramic Society. 92 (9): 1901–1920. doi:10.1111/j.1551-2916.2009.03278.x.
