= Adolph Coors III =

Murdered heir to the Coors beer empire (1915-1960)

- Born: January 12, 1915; Golden, Colorado, U.S.
- Died: February 9, 1960 (aged 45); Morrison, Colorado, U.S.
- Cause of death: Murder by gunshot
- Education: Cornell University
- Spouse: Mary Urquhart Grant (m. 1940)
- Children: 4
- Parent: Adolph Coors II (father)
- Relatives: Adolph Coors (grandfather); William Coors (brother); Joseph Coors (brother)

Adolph Coors III (January 12, 1915 – February 9, 1960) was the grandson of Adolph Coors and heir to the Coors Brewing Company empire. He died in a kidnapping for ransom attempt gone wrong; Joseph Corbett Jr. was convicted of murder in 1961 and released on parole in 1980.

== Life and career ==
Coors was born on January 12, 1915, the son of Alice May (née Kistler; 1885–1970) and Adolph Coors Jr. He attended Phillips Exeter Academy in New Hampshire. Like his father and his youngest brother Joseph Coors, Adolph graduated from Cornell University, where he was president of the Quill and Dagger society and a member of the Kappa Alpha Society. Coors was also a semiprofessional baseball player. At the time of his death, he was CEO and chairman of the board of the Coors Brewing Company in Golden, Colorado. Coors married Mary Urquhart Grant in November 1940. The couple had four children together.

== Kidnapping ==
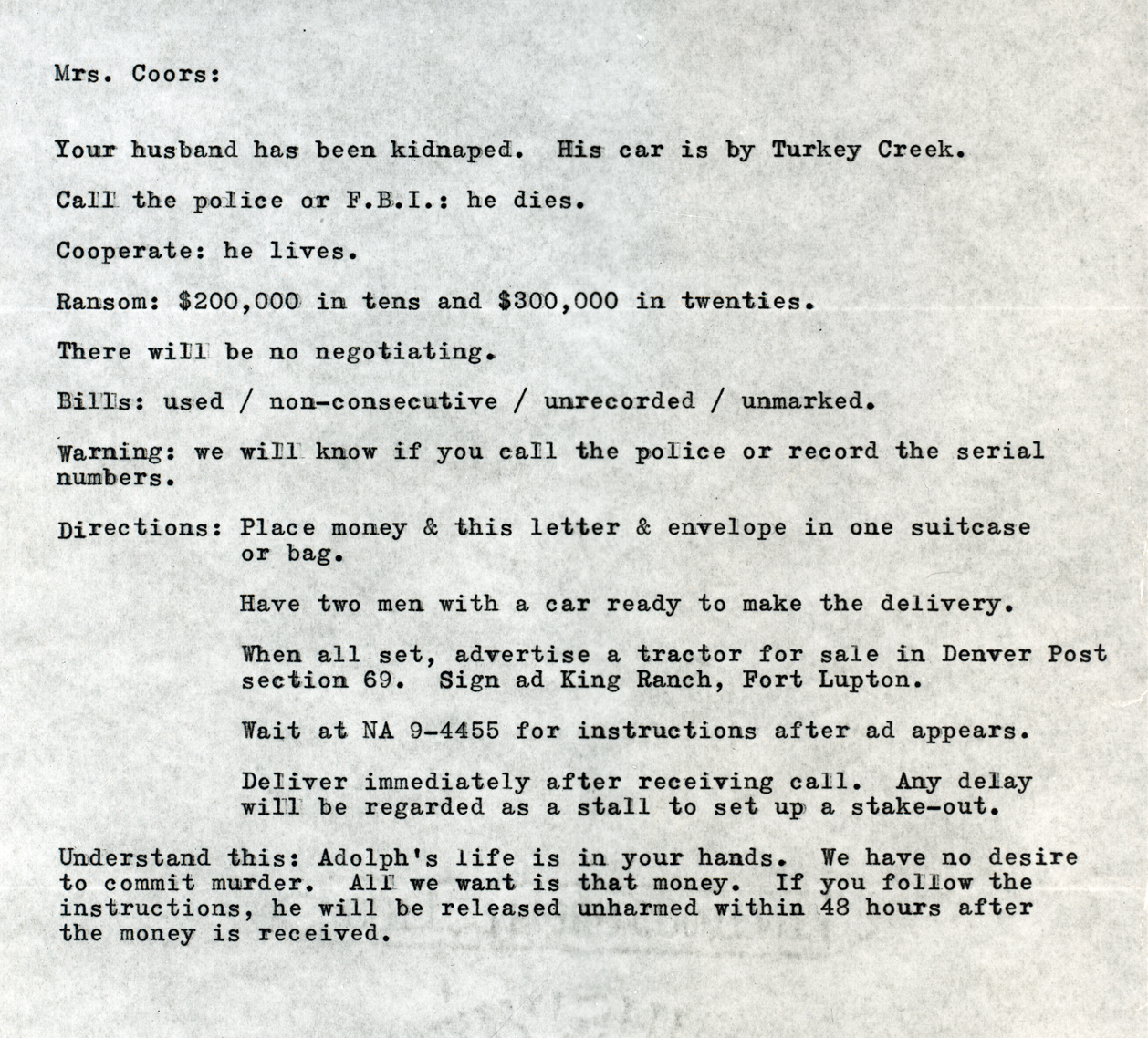
The ransom note

On February 9, 1960, Coors had to take a detour onto Turkey Creek Bridge near Morrison, Colorado due to construction work that had been going on since January. Joseph Corbett Jr., a convicted murderer who had escaped from prison in California and had been secretly stalking Coors for months, parked his car in the middle of the bridge a few minutes before Coors arrived. Corbett was pretending to be broke down. Coors left his car to help Corbett, but Corbett attempted to kidnap Coors. There was a brief struggle and Corbett shot Coors twice in the back as Coors was running back to his car.

Later that morning, a milkman discovered Coors' International Travelall on the bridge, empty of occupants and with the radio on. Police identified the vehicle as belonging to Coors, and began a search of the area that turned up Coors' hat, glasses, and a blood stain. The next day, his wife Mary received a ransom note in the mail requesting $500,000 for his safe release. The hunt for Coors and his assailant was the largest FBI effort since the Lindbergh baby kidnapping.

On September 11, 1960, a hiker by the name of Edward Lee Greene Jr. stumbled upon a pair of discarded trousers in the Rocky Mountains, and found in the pocket a penknife bearing the initials "ACIII." Then on September 15, 1960, a shirt belonging to Coors, and his skull, were found in a remote area near Pikes Peak.

A witness turned up who revealed he had seen a yellow 1951 Mercury with the letters "AT" and numerals "62" somewhere in the license plate combination on the bridge around the time of Coors' disappearance. A car matching the description was found torched in a dump in Atlantic City, New Jersey. Investigators traced the car back to a Colorado resident named Walter Osborne, who suspiciously moved out of his Denver apartment the day after the kidnapping. The name "Walter Osborne" was revealed to be an alias for Corbett. Due to international obsession with the case, including a picture of Corbett in an issue of Reader's Digest, he was recognized by two neighbors in Vancouver, B.C., and was arrested.

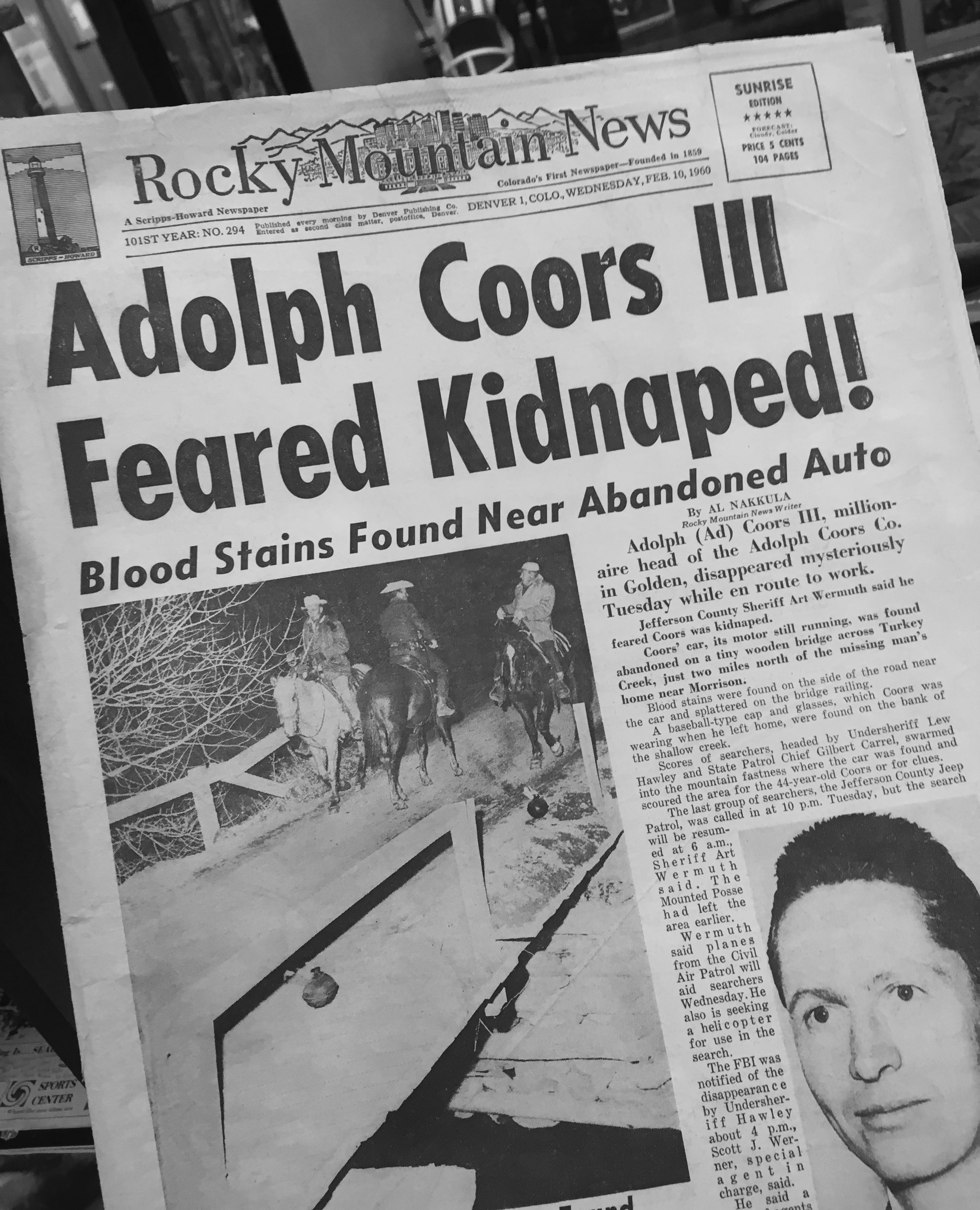
February 10, 1960 cover of the Rocky Mountain News

As no witnesses were found, prosecutors built their case against Corbett through circumstantial and forensic evidence. Corbett's coworkers overheard him talking about a plan that would earn him over $1 million and the ransom note typeface was traced back to Corbett's typewriter. The biggest piece of evidence, however, was the soil found in the undercarriage of the yellow Mercury. Investigators were able to trace the car's path by noting the rare pink feldspar and granite minerals found in the area Coors' body was discovered. Corbett was convicted of first-degree murder on March 29, 1961, and sentenced to life in state prison. He was released on parole in 1980 for good behavior and drove a truck for the Salvation Army until he retired. He died by suicide at the age of 80 in August 2009. He lived and died just 10 miles from where he killed Coors and always maintained his innocence.

The kidnapping was featured in the Forensic Files episode "Bitter Brew". The 2017 true crime book The Death of an Heir: Adolph Coors III and the Murder That Rocked an American Brewing Dynasty by Philip Jett details the kidnapping.

== Legacy ==
An avid skier, Coors was inducted into the Colorado Ski and Snowboard Hall of Fame in 1998.

== See also ==
- List of kidnappings (1960–1969)
- List of solved missing person cases (1950–1969)
