= Graphic Packaging =

American packaging company

Graphic Packaging International
- Type: Public company
- Traded as: NYSE: GPK; S&P 400 component
- Founded: 1978
- Headquarters: Atlanta, Georgia, United States
- Key people: Robbert Rietbroek (President & CEO)
- Revenue: ▼US$8.62 billion (2025)
- Net income: ▼US$444 million (2025)
- Number of employees: c. 23,000 (June 2025)
- Website: graphicpkg.com

Graphic Packaging International is a Fortune 500 corporation based in Atlanta, Georgia, United States. It designs and manufactures packaging solutions for commercial products. GPI manufactures paperboard and folding cartons for a wide range of popular consumer goods, particularly beverages and packaged food. The company operates paperboard mills in Kalamazoo, Michigan; Macon, Georgia; Middletown, Ohio; Prosperity, South Carolina; Texarkana, Texas; and West Monroe, Louisiana, that use recycled municipal wastewater in the manufacture of food grade cardboard and coated paperboard. Its President and Chief Executive Officer is Robbert Rietbroek.
