= Adolph Coors =

American businessman (1847–1894)

- Born: Adolph Hermann Josef Kuhrs; February 4, 1847; Barmen, Rhenish Prussia, Kingdom of Prussia
- Died: June 5, 1929 (aged 82); Virginia Beach, Virginia, U.S.
- Resting place: Crown Hill Cemetery, Wheat Ridge, Colorado, U.S. 39.7595°N 105.0898°W
- Occupation: Brewer
- Parent(s): Joseph Kuhrs (c. 1820–1862); Helena Hein (c. 1820–1862)

Adolph Herman Joseph Coors Sr. (February 4, 1847 – June 5, 1929) was a German-American brewer who founded the Adolph Coors Company in Golden, Colorado, in 1873.

== Early life ==
Adolph Hermann Joseph Kuhrs was born in Barmen in Rhenish Prussia on February 4, 1847, the son of Joseph Kuhrs (circa 1820–1862) and Helena Heim (circa 1820–1862). He was apprenticed at age 13 to the book and stationery store of Andrea and Company in nearby Ruhrort from November 1860 until June 1862. His mother died on April 2, 1862. The Kuhrs family moved to Dortmund, Westphalia. In July 1862, Adolph was apprenticed for a three-year period at Kronen, a brewery owned by Heinrich Wenker in Dortmund. He was charged a fee for his apprenticeship, so he worked as a bookkeeper to pay for it. His father died on November 24, 1862. Orphaned, Adolph completed his apprenticeship and continued to work as a paid employee at the Wenker Brewery until May 1867. He then worked at breweries in Kassel, Berlin, and Uelzen in Germany.

Early in 1868, he came to the United States as an undocumented stowaway. Although under United States immigration law of the time his presence in America was legal and he legally became a citizen, with the only law he actually broke being in stowing away and not paying for his transportation (which may not have even been a U.S. law depending on which nation flagged his vessel), Coors nevertheless remained ashamed of that action for the rest of his life, and decreed that his family should never speak about it. The family never openly discussed the fact that the family patriarch had been a stowaway until his son's death in 1970. He sailed from Hamburg to New York City and then moved to Chicago, arriving on May 30, 1868. His name was changed from "Kuhrs" to "Coors". He worked in the spring as a laborer, and during the summer he worked as a brewer. In the fall and winter, he worked as a fireman, loading coal into the firebox of a steam engine. In the spring and summer of 1869, he worked as an apprentice bricklayer and a stone cutter. He became foreman of John Stenger's brewery on August 11, 1869, in Naperville, Illinois, about 35 miles west of Chicago.

He resigned from Stenger's brewery on January 22, 1872, and moved to Denver, arriving in April. He worked in Denver as a gardener for a month, and on May 1, 1872, he purchased a partnership in the bottling firm of John Staderman. In the same year, he bought and assumed control of the entire business.

== Golden Brewery ==
On November 14, 1873, Coors and the Denver confectioner Jacob Schueler purchased the abandoned Golden City Tannery and converted it to the Golden Brewery. By February 1874 they were producing beer for sale, hitting the market at the beginning of April. In 1880, Coors purchased Schueler's interest, and the brewery was renamed Adolph Coors Golden Brewery. When Prohibition began in Colorado in 1916, he converted his brewery to make malted milk. The company also manufactured porcelain and ceramic products made from clay mined in Golden. The Coors Porcelain division has since split off and is now known as CoorsTek.

== Marriage and family ==
=== Immediate family ===
On April 12, 1879, Adolph Coors married Louisa Webber, the daughter of the superintendent of the Denver and Rio Grande Railroad maintenance shops. They were married at the Coors home on the brewery grounds. Adolph and Louisa raised three sons and three daughters to adulthood, with two children dying in infancy. Louise was born on March 2, 1880, and was nicknamed Lulu among her many friends. Their second child was Augusta, born in 1881, and known by her nickname of Gussie. The fifth born and third surviving child was Adolph Coors Jr., on January 12, 1884. Bertha Coors was born on June 24, 1886, and Grover C. Coors was born in 1888. The last addition to the family, Herman Frederick Coors, was born on July 24, 1890, while the family was on vacation in Berlin.

All of the daughters attended the Wolcott School for Girls in Denver. Louise married Henry F. Kugeler at the Coors Mansion, and Augusta married Herbert E. Collbran there on October 5, 1905. At the time, Transcript editor George West wrote, "Miss Coors is a native Golden girl and proud of it. She is pretty and talented, and by her universally pleasant and courteous demeanor has endeared herself to all the people of her native town." She and her husband moved to Korea where his father was the nation's transportation adviser. Herbert Collbran held an important position with the government railways. The international shipping of Coors beer, beginning in Korea in 1908, possibly was related to the family's presence there.

Adolph Jr., Grover, and Herman all graduated from Cornell University, and returned to Denver to take positions in the family operations. Adolph Jr. was married to Alice May Kistler at the Kistler home, and the family lived in Denver. Grover married Gertrude at the Coors Mansion. Bertha, who became an accomplished equestrienne and safari hunter, married Harold S. Munroe on January 8, 1911, at the Coors Mansion. They moved to Mexico, where Harold worked in gold-mining operations. Herman Coors married Dorothea Clara Morse from Ithaca, NY, on May 31, 1916, working in the family porcelain factory in Golden, CO. In 1926, he, Dorothea, and their two boys, Dallas Morse Coors and Robert Morse Coors, Jr., moved to Inglewood, California, where he established the H.F. Coors China Company. He later married Janet Ferrin on June 9, 1942.

=== Siblings ===
Adolph Coors is known to have had at least two siblings, a sister and a younger brother, William Kuhrs, who was born in Dortmund, Germany, in 1849. William followed his brother to America in 1870 and took the same respelling of the family name. He made his way to Chicago, where he made a good living as a cabinetmaker and arrived in Golden by the mid-1870s. He took a good position of employment at his brother's brewery, where he remained employed for the rest of his life. Following further in his brother's footsteps, William married Louisa's sister Mary in 1881, and 10 years later moved to Denver, where he had charge of the Coors interests in that city. The couple had three daughters, two of whom were Mattie and Helena. William Coors died on December 30, 1923, and is buried at the Golden Cemetery. Upon his death, the Colorado Transcript described him as "a genial, accommodating man, and had many friends in Golden, Denver, and elsewhere." His oldest daughter married William J. Gilbert and the second married Charles Nitschke.

== Death ==
On June 5, 1929, Adolph Coors died after falling from a sixth-floor window of the Cavalier Hotel in Virginia Beach, Virginia. His death may have been a suicide.

== See also ==
- Eberhard Anheuser
- Jacob Best
- Valentin Blatz
- Adolphus Busch
- August Anheuser Busch Sr.
- Adolph Coors III
- Pete Coors
- Gottlieb Heileman
- Frederick Miller
- Frederick Pabst
- Joseph Schlitz
- August Uihlein
