= Coors Brewing Company =

American brewery and beer company

- Type: Subsidiary
- Industry: Beverages
- Founded: 1873; 153 years ago
- Founder: Adolph Coors and Jacob Schueler
- Headquarters: Golden, Colorado, United States
- Products: Beer
- Parent: Molson Coors
- Website: coors.com

The Coors Brewing Company is an American brewery and beer company based in Golden, Colorado. Founded in 1873 by Adolph Coors and Jacob Schueler, it is a subsidiary of Molson Coors. The first Coors brewery in Golden is the largest single site brewery operating in the world.

== History ==
=== Founding ===
In 1873, German immigrants Adolph Coors and Jacob Schueler from Prussia immigrated to the United States and established a brewery in what was then Golden City, Colorado Territory (now Golden, Colorado), after buying a recipe for a Pilsner-style beer from a Czech immigrant, William Silhan. Coors invested $2,000 in the operation, and Schueler invested $18,000.

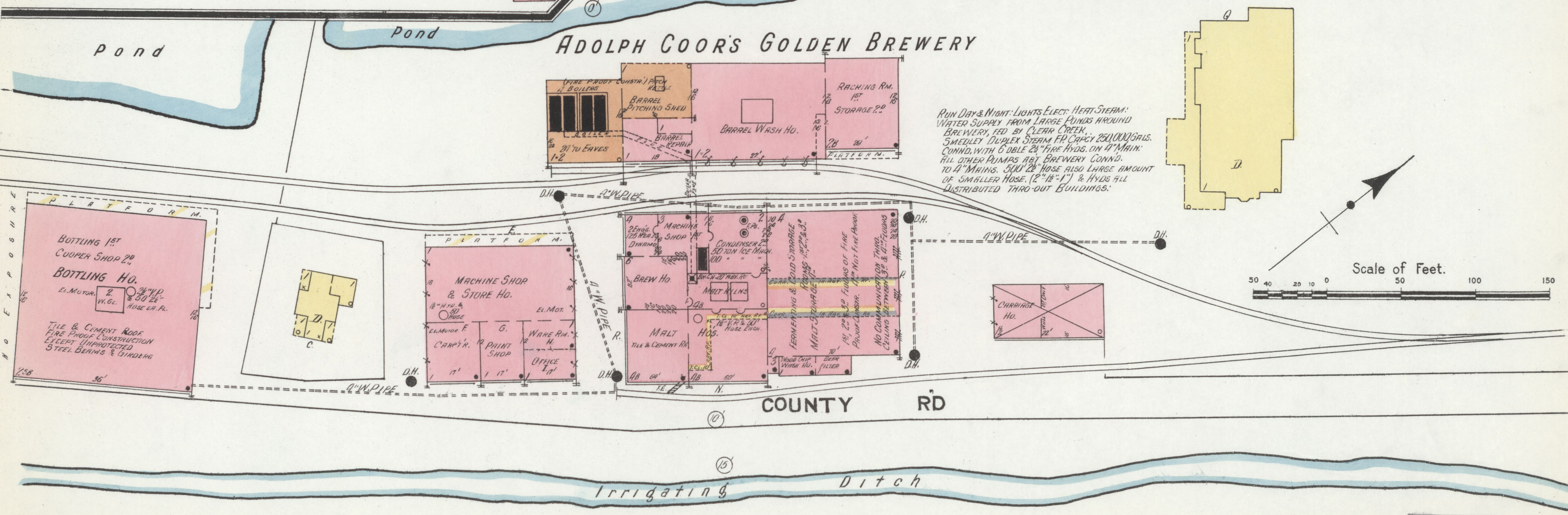
"ADOLPH COORS GOLDEN BREWERY" June 1911 map detail from Sanborn Fire Insurance Map

In 1880, Coors bought out his partner and became the sole owner of the brewery.. Following the buyout, the firm was renamed the Adolph Coors Golden Brewery. During this era, Coors adopted a conservative growth strategy that prioritized product quality over aggressive expansion, famously spending only about $0.70 per barrel on advertising, which was only a fraction of the $3.00 per barrel spent by national "shipping" brewers like Anheuser-Busch. This approach was tied to the specific heritage of the brewery's flagship pilsner. Coors' flagship beer is usually described as Czech or Pilsner-style— the same family of pale lagers that made Plzeň famous after Josef Groll’s 1842 brew, the root of what became Pilsner Urquell. William Silhan (a brewmaster and associate of William Coors)’s exact path in Bohemia isn’t spelled out in the familiar English references, so the flagship Golden recipe is best thought of as part of that tradition rather than as a documented chapter of the Plzeň brewery’s payroll.. Coors maintained that the beer’s quality, derived from this Bohemian lineage and the "soft" alpine water of Clear Creek, necessitated a policy of local refrigeration rather than the pasteurization used by national brands.

By the turn of the century, the brewery had become the largest in the state, and in 1913, it was formally incorporated as the Adolph Coors Brewing and Manufacturing Company. The company also began a trend of vertical integration and early environmentalism; in 1885, the brewery established a bottle-return program, paying 45 cents for every dozen empty quart bottles returned to the facility. This period of industrialization saw the brewery transition from a small-scale partnership into a massive complex that included its own bottling plant and a dedicated rail spur.

=== Prohibition ===
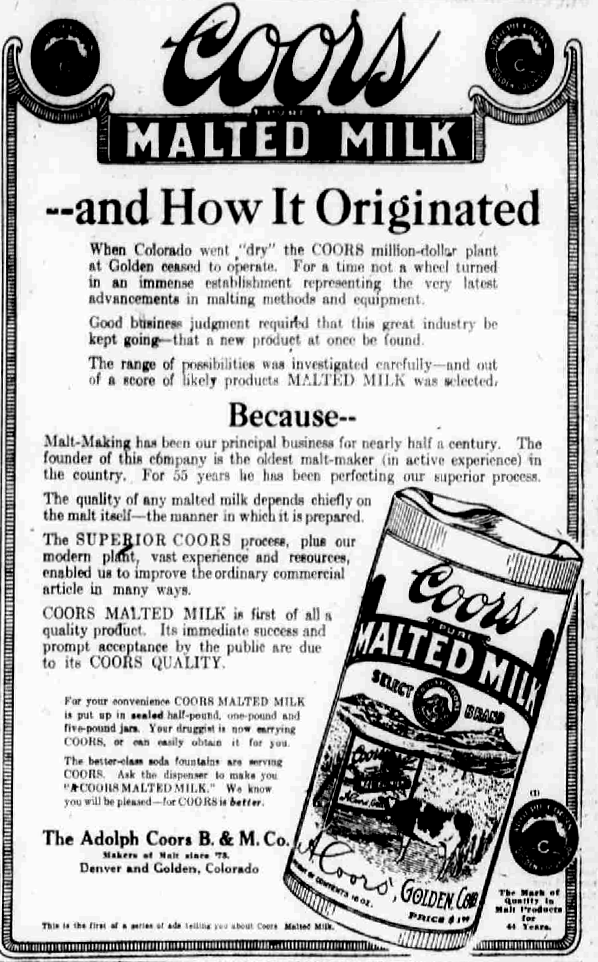
Ad for Coors Malted Milk, produced in 1918

The Coors Brewing Company managed to survive Prohibition relatively intact. Years before the Volstead Act went into effect nationwide, Adolph Coors established the Adolph Coors Brewing and Manufacturing Company, which included Herold Porcelain and other ventures, with sons Adolph Jr., Grover and Herman. The brewery itself was converted into a malted milk and near beer production facility. Coors sold much of the malted milk to the Mars candy company to produce sweets. Manna, the company's non-alcoholic beer replacement, was a near-beer similar to current non-alcoholic beverages. Coors resumed making alcohol products in a limited but important way in 1921 when state law enabled them to manufacture industrial alcohol. Vital for hospital sterilization use and also used by doctors, dentists, laboratories and for radiator antifreeze, this was made with a legally required additive to make it unpalatable for drinking (such as acetone, which with the same boiling point as alcohol was impossible for bootleggers to separate), and Coors was one of only two Colorado manufacturers of industrial alcohol along with the Ethyl Products Corporation of Johnstown. Production of industrial alcohol by Coors required initially manufacturing real beer, from which this alcohol was separated with the remaining product sold as near beer. However, Coors and his sons relied heavily on the porcelain company and a cement and real estate company to keep the Coors Brewing Company afloat. By 1933, after the end of Prohibition, the Coors brewery was one of only a handful of breweries that had survived.

All of the non-brewery assets of the Adolph Coors Company were spun off between 1989 and 1992. The descendant of the original Herold Porcelain ceramics business continues to operate as CoorsTek.

=== Products ===
For much of its first 100 years of existence, Coors beer was marketed solely in the American West. While California and Texas were part of the 11-state distribution area, Washington and Montana were not added until 1976 (Oregon did not approve sales in grocery stores until 1985). This gave it mystique and made it a novelty, particularly on the East Coast, and visitors returning from the western states often brought back a case. This iconic status was reflected in the 1977 film Smokey and the Bandit. The company finally established nationwide distribution in the United States in 1986.

In 1959, Coors became the first American brewer to use an all-aluminum two-piece beverage can. Also in 1959, the company abandoned pasteurization and began to use sterile filtration to stabilize its beer. Coors currently operates the largest aluminum can producing plant in the world, known as the Rocky Mountain Metal Container (RMMC), in Golden. RMMC is a joint venture between Ball Metal and Coors, having been founded in 2003.

In the mid-1970s, Coors invented the litter-free push tab can, in place of the ring pull-tab. However, consumers disliked the top and it was discontinued soon afterward.

Coors Light was introduced in 1978. The longtime slogan of "Silver Bullet" to describe it does not describe the beer, but rather the silver-colored can in which Coors packaged the beer. Coors once produced Coors Light in "yellow-bellied" cans like the full-strength Coors. However, when the yellow coloring was removed, the can was left mostly silver.

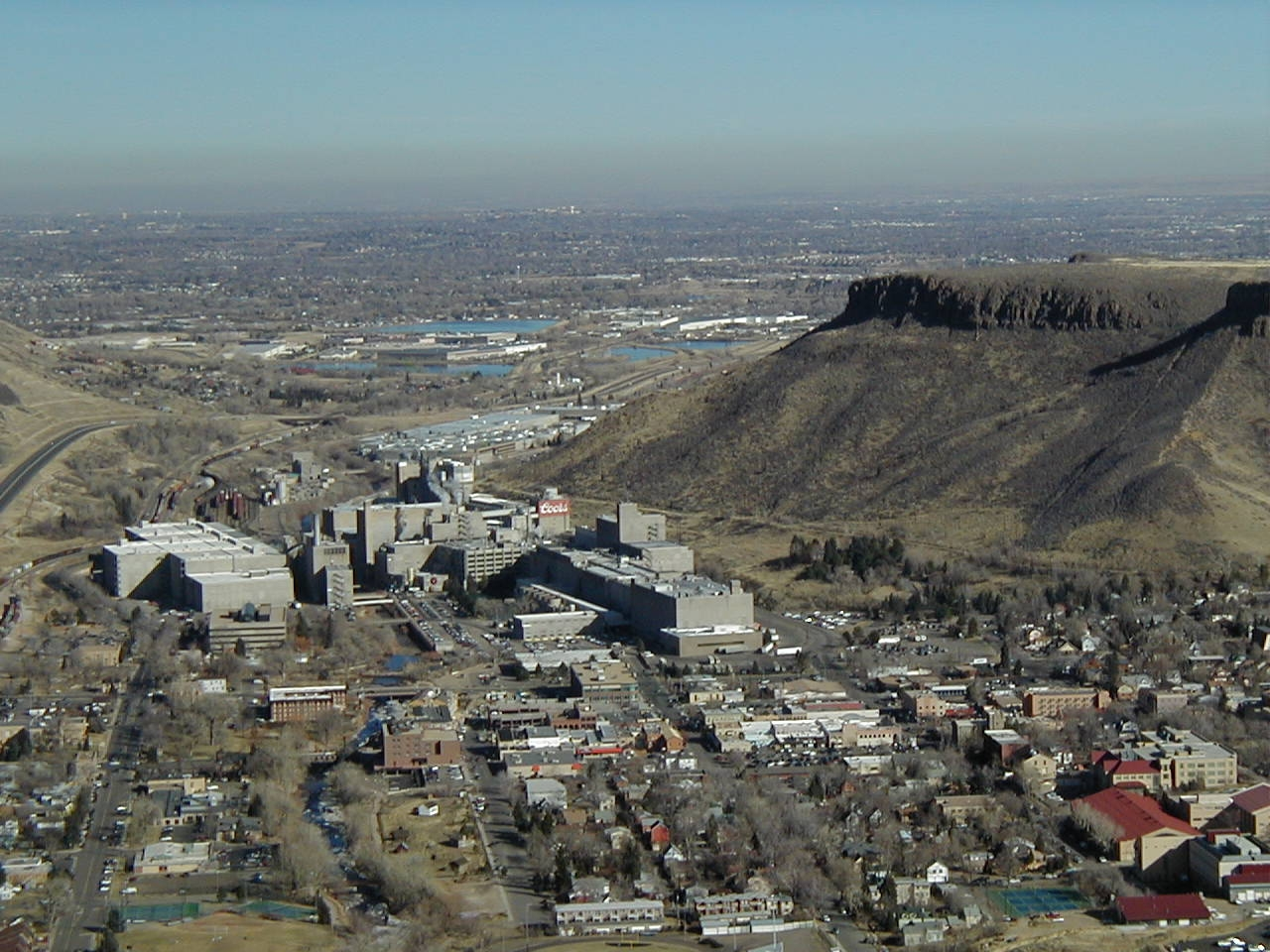
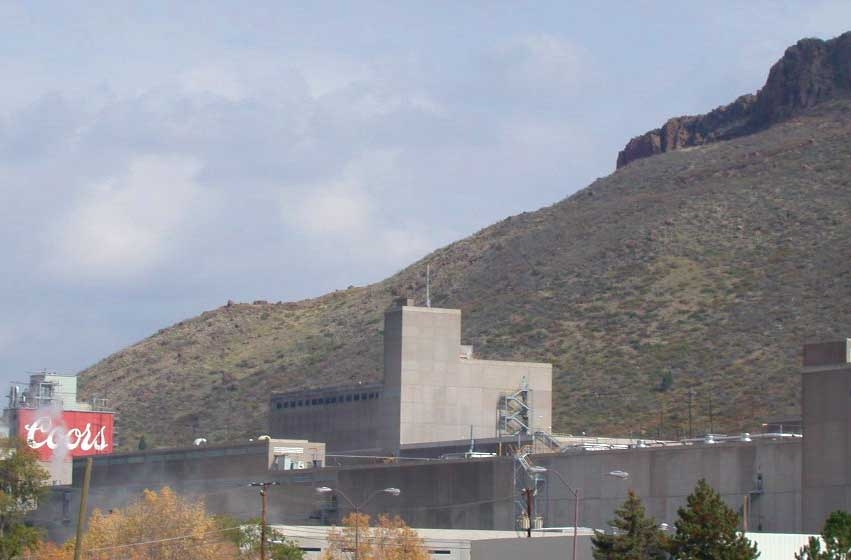
Coors brewery in Golden, Colorado

=== Mergers ===
On July 22, 2004, the Adolph Coors Company, the holding company that owned Coors Brewing, announced it would be merging with Canadian brewing company Molson, Inc. The merger was completed February 9, 2005, with the merged company being named Molson Coors Brewing Company. Coors Brewing Company became a subsidiary of the new company. Due to the merger, Molson Coors was rated the third largest producer of beer in the United States, and the second largest brewer in the United Kingdom.

== Brands ==
Coors is responsible for promoting and distributing several alcoholic beverage brands. The most notable of those brands are Coors Banquet, Coors Light, Blue Moon, Keystone, and Miller.

== Controversies ==
=== Labor problems ===
In April 1977, the brewery workers union at Coors, representing 1,472 employees, went on strike. The brewery kept operating with supervisors and 250 to 300 union members, including one union executive board member who ignored the strike. Soon after, Coors announced that it would hire replacements for the striking workers. About 700 workers quit the picket line to go back to work, and Coors replaced the remaining 500 workers, keeping the beer production process uninterrupted. In December 1978, the workers at Coors voted by greater than a two-to-one ratio to decertify the union, ending 44 years of union representation at Coors. Because the strike was more than a year old, striking workers could not vote in the election.

Labor unions organized a boycott to punish Coors for its labor practices. One tactic employed by the unions was a push for states to pass laws banning the sale of unpasteurized canned and bottled beer. Because Coors was the only major brewer at the time not pasteurizing its canned and bottled beer, such laws would hurt only Coors. Sales of Coors suffered during the decade-long labor union boycott. However, Coors claimed that declining sales were also due to an industry-wide downturn in beer sales and increased competition. To maintain production, Coors expanded its sales area from the 18 western states to which it had marketed for years to nationwide distribution. This was completed in 1991, with Indiana being the last state for the brand to appear.

The AFL–CIO ended its boycott of Coors in August 1987, after negotiations with Pete Coors, head of brewery operations. The settlement details were not divulged but were said to include an early union representation election in Colorado and the use of union workers to build the new Coors brewery in Virginia.

In 1988, the Teamsters Union, which represented brewery workers at the top three U.S. beer makers at the time (Anheuser-Busch, Miller, and Stroh), gained enough signatures to trigger a union representation election inside the Coors company. Coors workers again rejected union representation by more than a two-to-one ratio.

=== Minority issues ===
Mexican Americans charged Coors with discriminatory hiring practices following the passage of the Civil Rights Act. They launched a boycott of the company's products beginning in the late 1960s. Labor unions and gay rights activists joined the boycott, which lasted into the 1980s.

A federal lawsuit in 1975 by the Equal Employment Opportunity Commission ended in a settlement with Coors agreeing not to discriminate against blacks, Hispanics, and women. In 1977, Coors was accused of firing gay and lesbian employees. From the late 1970s, Coors agreed not to discriminate against homosexuals; the first major brewery in the United States to make such a commitment.

Coors encouraged the organization of its gay and lesbian employees into the Lesbian and Gay Employee Resource (LAGER) in 1993. In May 1995, Coors became the 21st publicly traded corporation in the United States to extend employee benefits to same-sex partners. When company chairman Pete Coors was criticized for the company's gay-friendly policy during his 2004 Republican primary campaign for a United States Senate seat from Colorado, he defended the policy as a basic good business practice.

== In popular culture ==
The 1977 film Smokey and the Bandit centers on an illegal shipment of Coors from Texas to Georgia.

In 2014, Coors (as MillerCoors) entered a contract with FX Networks, the producer of TV shows such as It's Always Sunny in Philadelphia. Since season six of the show all beer in Paddy's Pub is Coors and the bar has Coors signs and logos scattered throughout it.

== Bibliography ==
- Baum, Dan (2000). Citizen Coors: A Grand Family Saga of Business, Politics, and Beer. New York: William Morrow & Company. ISBN 0-688-15448-4. OCLC 41516423. At the Internet Archive under a different title.
- Brantley, Allyson P. (2021). Brewing a Boycott: How a Grassroots Coalition Fought Coors and Remade American Consumer Activism. Chapel Hill, NC: The University of North Carolina Press. ISBN 978-1469661025. OCLC 1178869630.
