= Rio Mora =

Rio Mora may refer to:

- Mora River, a tributary of the Canadian River in New Mexico in the United States sometimes called the Rio Mora
- Rio Mora (Pecos River tributary), a tributary of the Pecos River in the Pecos Wilderness of New Mexico in the United States
- Rio Mora National Wildlife Refuge, a protected natural area in New Mexico in the United States
