= Las Vegas National Wildlife Refuge =

Wildlife refuge in the U.S. state of New Mexico

- IUCN category IV (habitat/species management area)
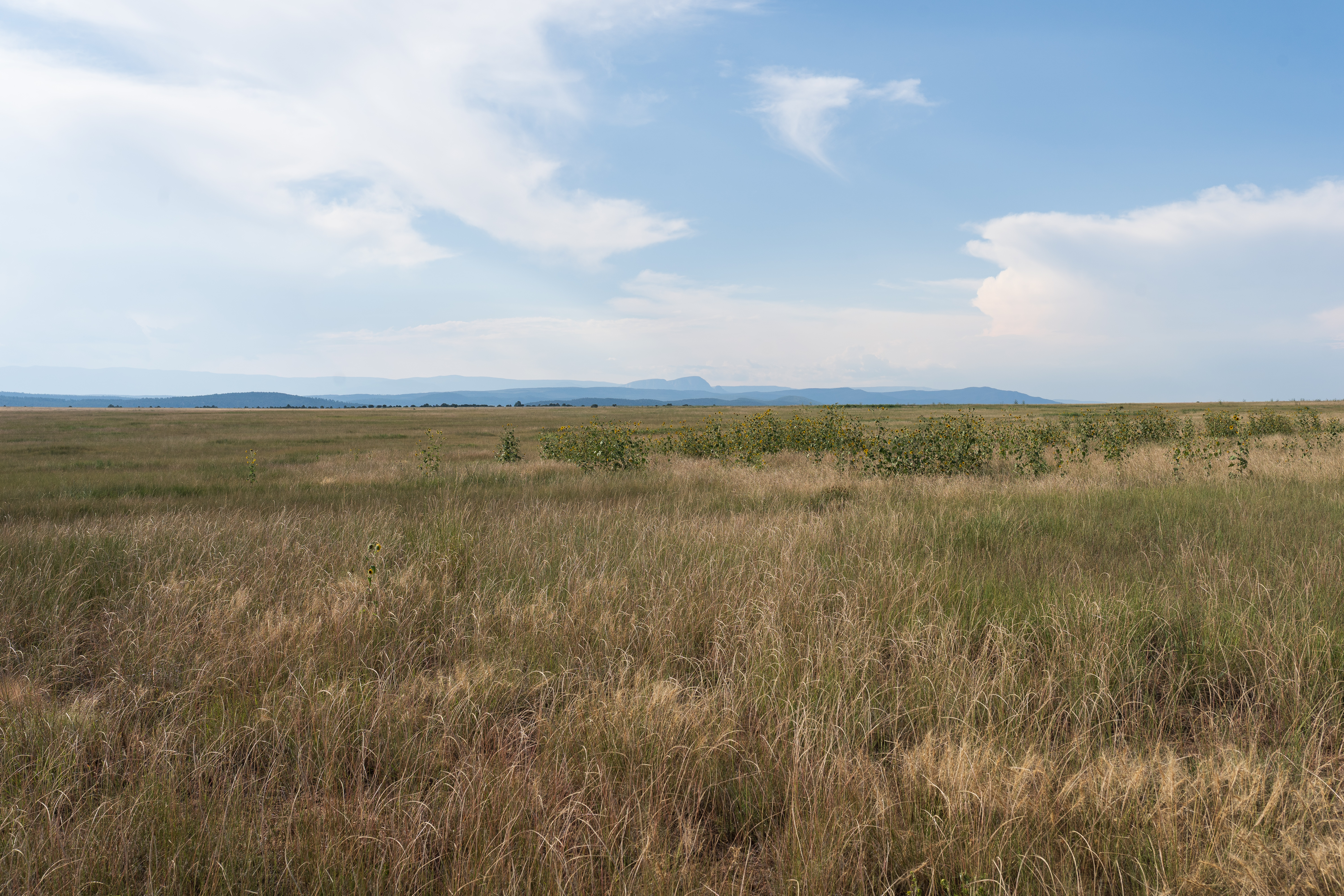
- Looking northwesterly across the refuge's grassland and marsh towards a distant Hermit's Peak

- Location within New Mexico Location within the United States
- Location: San Miguel County, New Mexico, USA
- Nearest city: Las Vegas, NM
- Coordinates: 35°30′30″N 105°10′02″W
- Area: 8,672 acres (35.09 km^{2})
- Established: 1965
- Governing body: U.S. Fish & Wildlife Service
- Website: Las Vegas National Wildlife Refuge

Las Vegas National Wildlife Refuge is a protected natural area in San Miguel County, New Mexico, United States, managed by the U.S. Fish & Wildlife Service as a National Wildlife Refuge. With the Rocky Mountains to the west, the Great Plains to the east, and the Chihuahuan Desert to the south, Las Vegas National Wildlife Refuge encompasses a diversity of habitats. Located along the Central Flyway, it provides an important resting, feeding, and wintering area for migrating geese, ducks, and cranes.

Las Vegas (Spanish for "the meadows") preserves both wildlife habitats and a slice of New Mexico's rich cultural history.

== History ==
The Las Vegas National Wildlife Refuge was established on February 14, 1965 by the administration of President Lyndon B. Johnson through the authority of the Migratory Bird Conservation Act. The refuge serves as a feeding and breeding ground for migratory birds and other wildlife. It represents one of the few sizeable wetland areas remaining in New Mexico.

Las Vegas National Wildlife Refuge is a part of a three-refuge complex spanning about 16,000 acres in total. Collectively known as the Northern New Mexico National Wildlife Refuge Complex, the complex shares staff between all three refuges. Other refuges in the complex include Maxwell National Wildlife Refuge and the Rio Mora National Wildlife Refuge and Conservation Area.

== Geography ==
The Las Vegas National Wildlife Refuge is located near the city of Las Vegas, New Mexico. The refuge rests on a plateau in the foothills with the Rocky Mountains just beyond. It's 8,672 acres (35.09 km^{2}) feature a mix of grassland, cropland, marshes, canyons, ponds and streams.

River canyon walls drop below the refuge on three sides. The western edge of the refuge is defined by the Gallinas river while Vegosa Creek and its canyon delineate an eastern boundary. The sandstone canyons abut pinyon-juniper woodlands with scrub oak and ponderosa pines lining the canyon rims.

== Wildlife ==
The refuge is home to rocky mountain elk, mule deer, antelope, coyotes, badgers, and ground and grey squirrels.

Resident bird life include wild turkeys, American kestrels, burrowing owls, canyon and rock wrens, Steller's jays, mountain and western bluebirds, and osprey.

Notable migrating species include sandhill cranes, long-billed curlews, rough-legged grouse, long-billed dowitchers, sandpipers, Canadian geese, avocets, mallards, northern pintails, blue-winged and cinnamon teal, gadwall and ruddy ducks, canvasbacks, wigeon, northern shovelers, Virginia rail, sora, crows, and black-crowned night herons. Migrating raptors such as bald eagles, northern harriers, and Swainson's hawks can also be seen in the refuge.

As of 1999, the Las Vegas NWR bird list has recorded 271 species. Of the list, 80 species have nested in the refuge and 50 of those are neotropical migrants, birds that spend their winters south of the continental U.S.

== Recreation ==
The refuge offers a number of recreation opportunities including hiking, wildlife viewing, photography, interpretive programs, and seasonal hunting.
