= Rio Mora National Wildlife Refuge =

National Wildlife Refuge in New Mexico

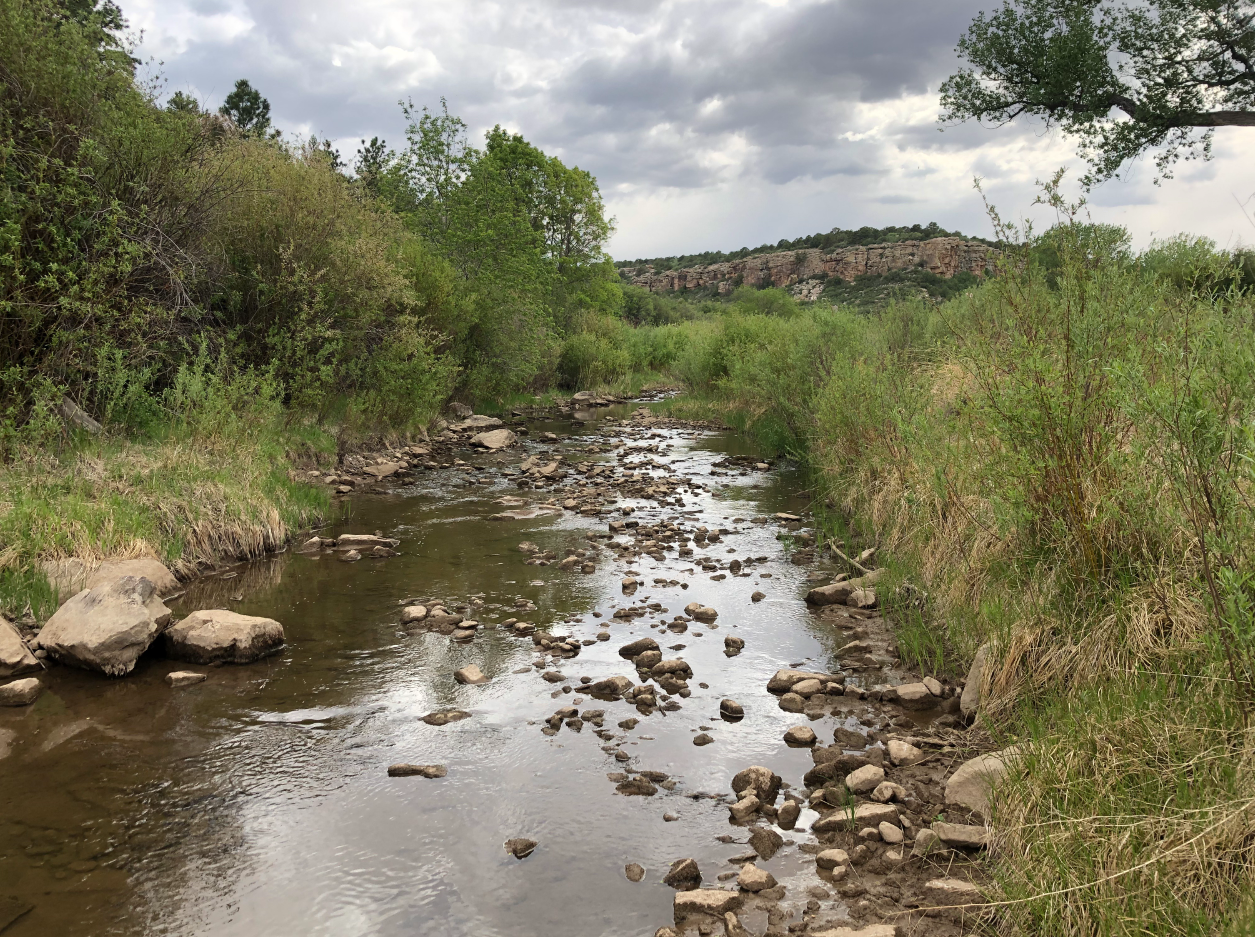
- An upstream view of the Mora River in the Rio Mora National Wildlife Refuge on November 15, 2021.

- Location within New Mexico Location within the United States
- Location: Mora County, New Mexico, United States
- Nearest city: Watrous, New Mexico
- Coordinates: 35.8206°N 105.0534°W
- Area: 4,224 acres (1,709 ha)
- Established: September 27, 2012
- Governing body: United States Fish and Wildlife Service
- Website: Rio Mora National Wildlife Refuge and Conservation Area

The Rio Mora National Wildlife Refuge is a National Wildlife Refuge of the United States in Mora County in northeastern New Mexico. It lies within the Rio Mora Conservation Area and is part of the Northern New Mexico National Wildlife Refuge Complex.

== Geography ==
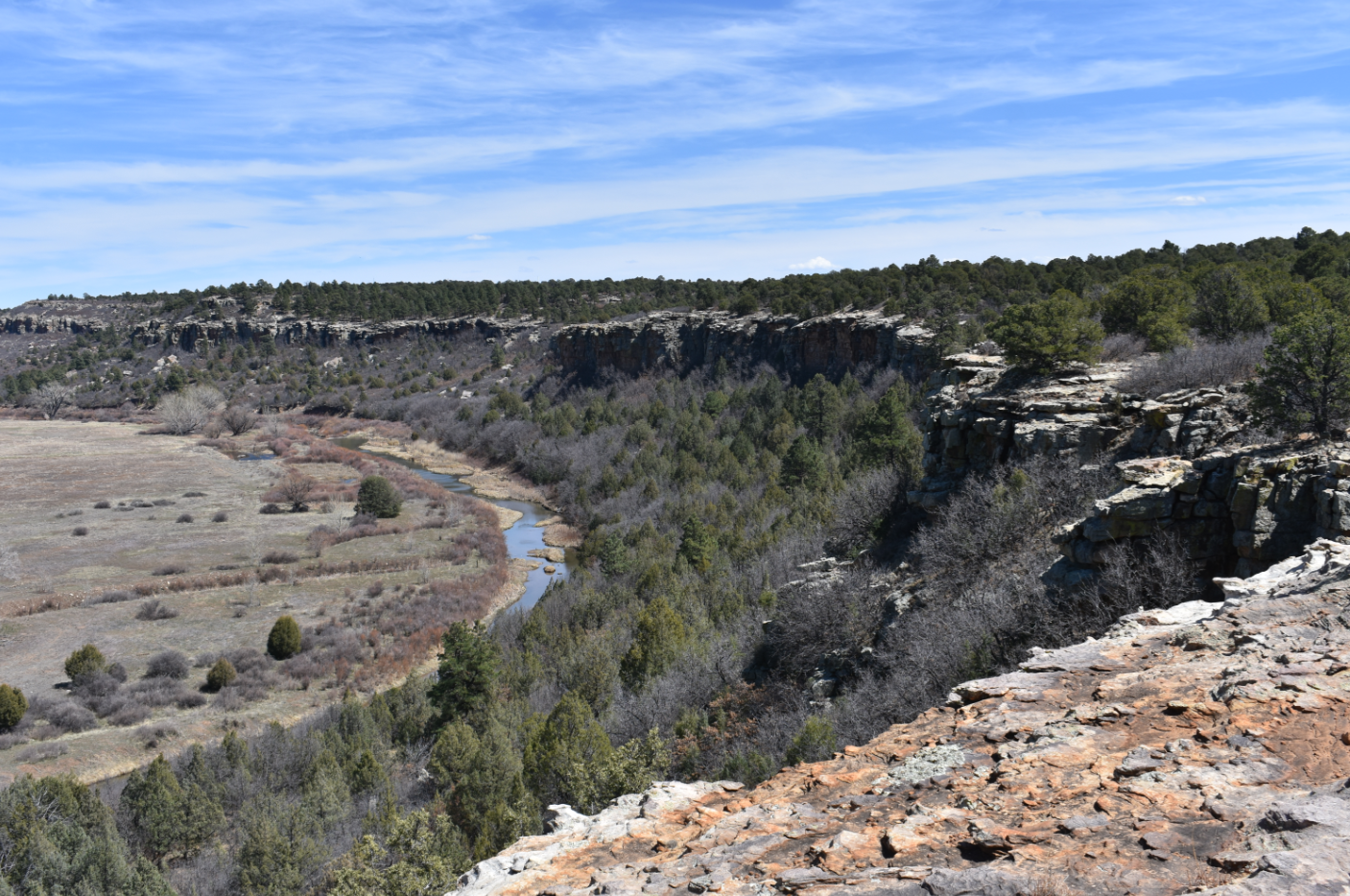
The Mora River from the March Juniper Trail Overlook on November 15, 2021.

The Rio Mora National Wildlife Refuge lies near Watrous, New Mexico, in the transition zone between the Great Plains and the Sangre de Cristo Mountains, the southernmost subrange of the Rocky Mountains. It covers an area of 4,224 acres (1,709 hectares; 6.6 sqmi; 17.09 km^{2}). A five-mile (8 km) stretch of the Mora River meanders through the refuge, sometimes running between steep canyon walls up to 300 feet (91 m) in height.

The refuge is located within the 952,000-acre (385,000-hectare; 1,488 sq mi; 3,850 km^{2}) Rio Mora Conservation Area, which encompasses the Mora River watershed. The conservation area includes the Mora River itself and its tributaries, such as Coyote Creek and the Sapello River, among others.

== Flora and fauna ==
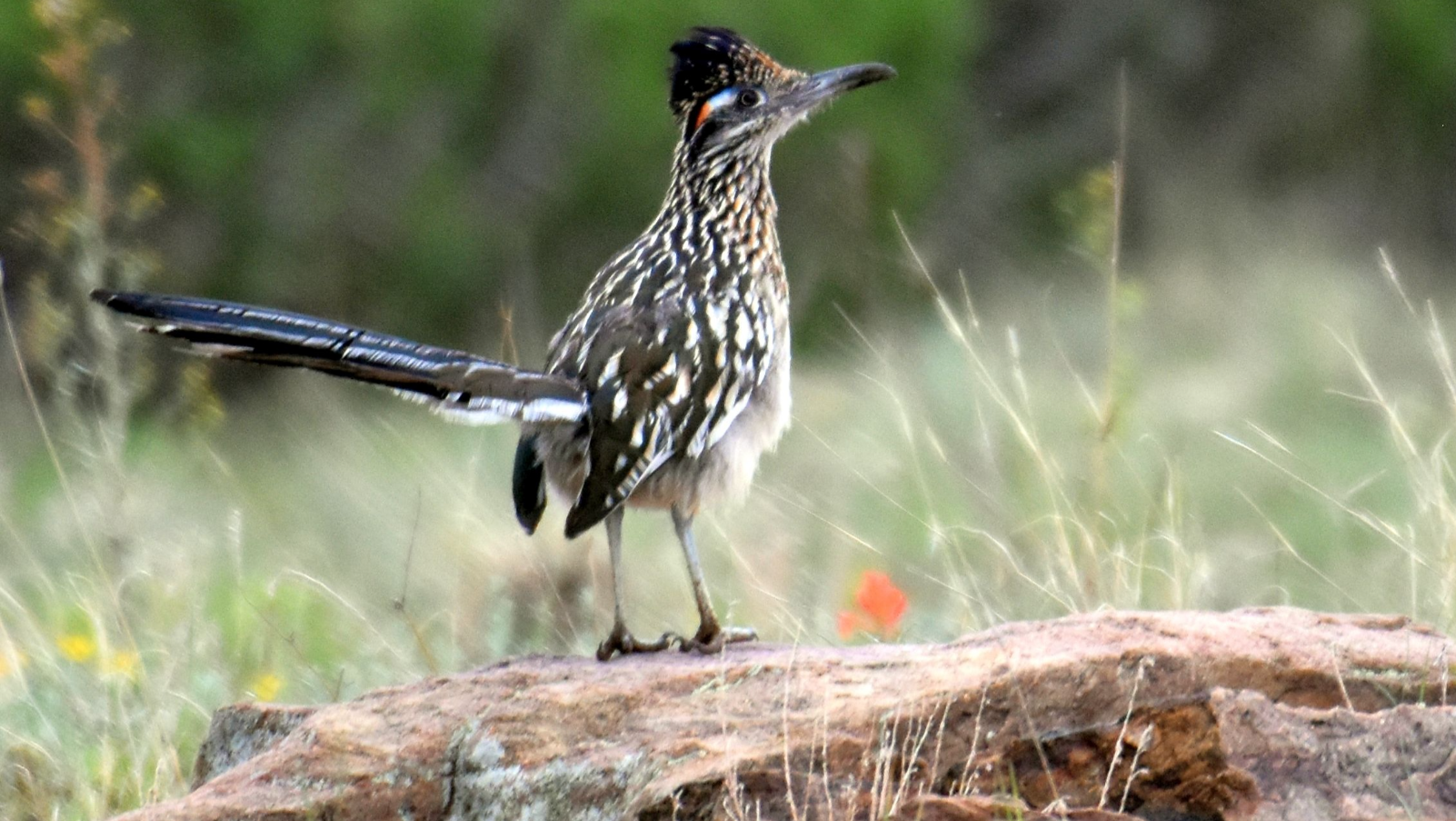
A greater roadrunner (Geococcyx californianus) in the refuge on July 23, 2020.

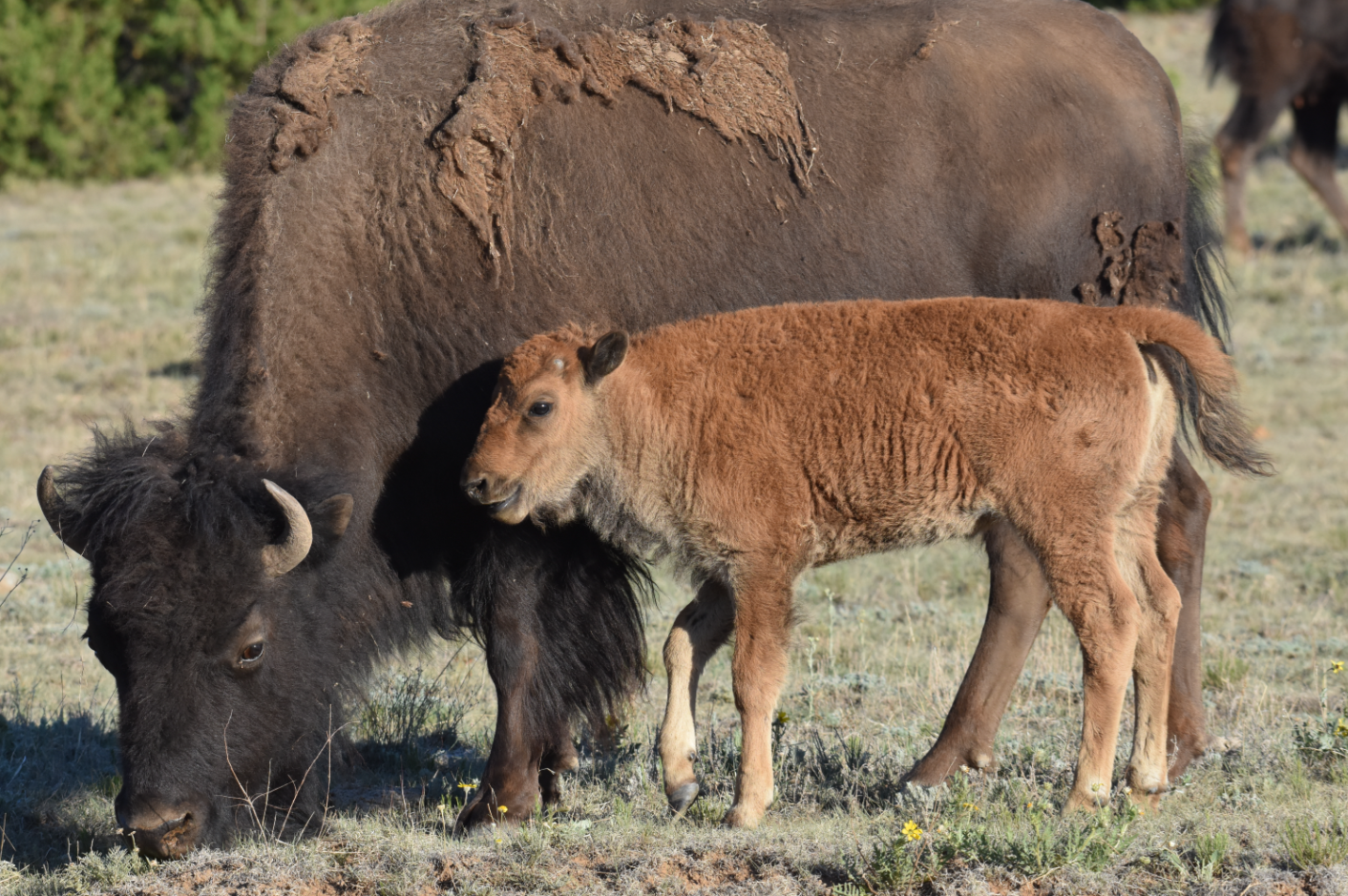
An American bison (Bison bison) cow and calf in the refuge on March 14, 2022.

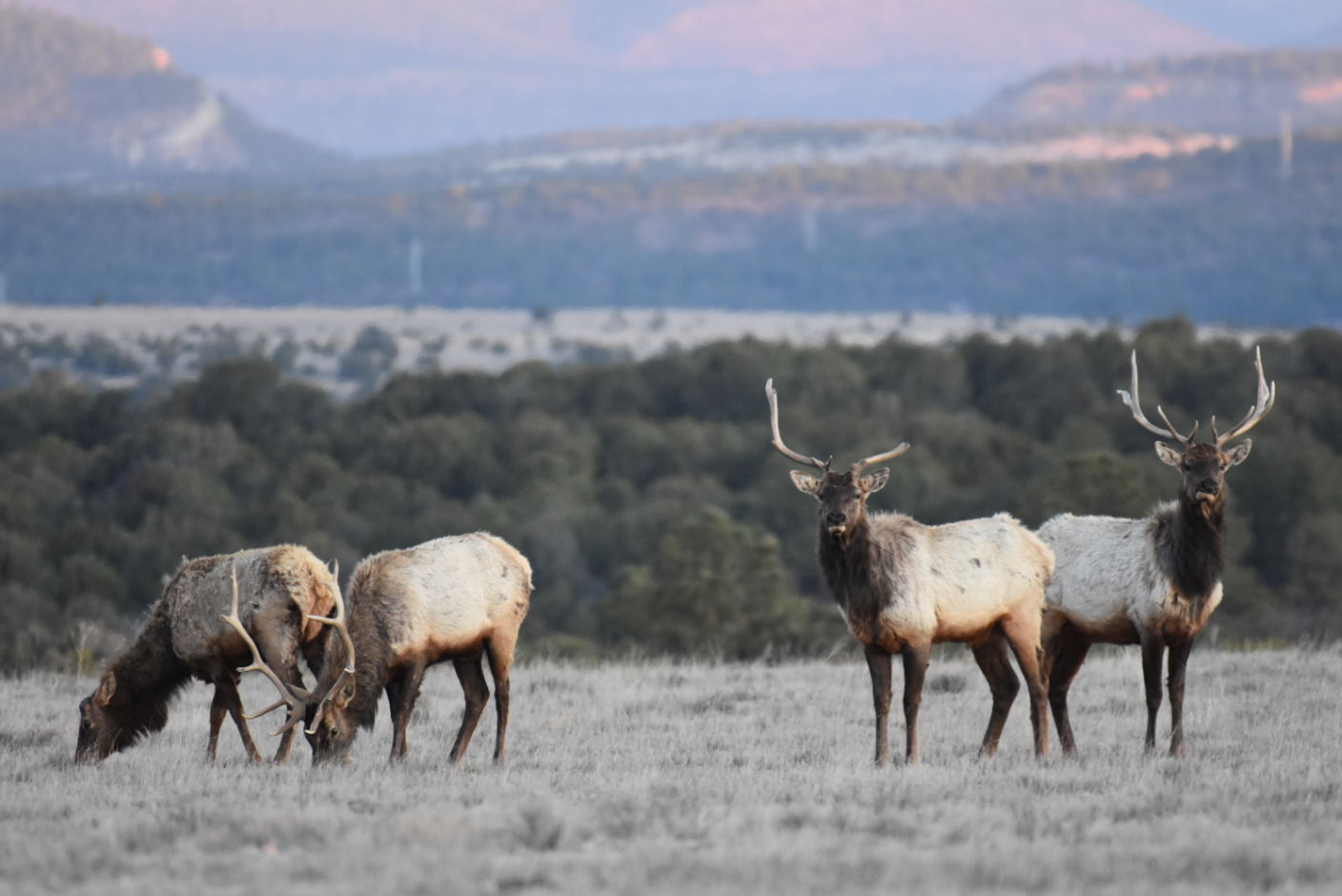
A herd of elk (Cervus canadensis) in the refuge on March 18, 2020.

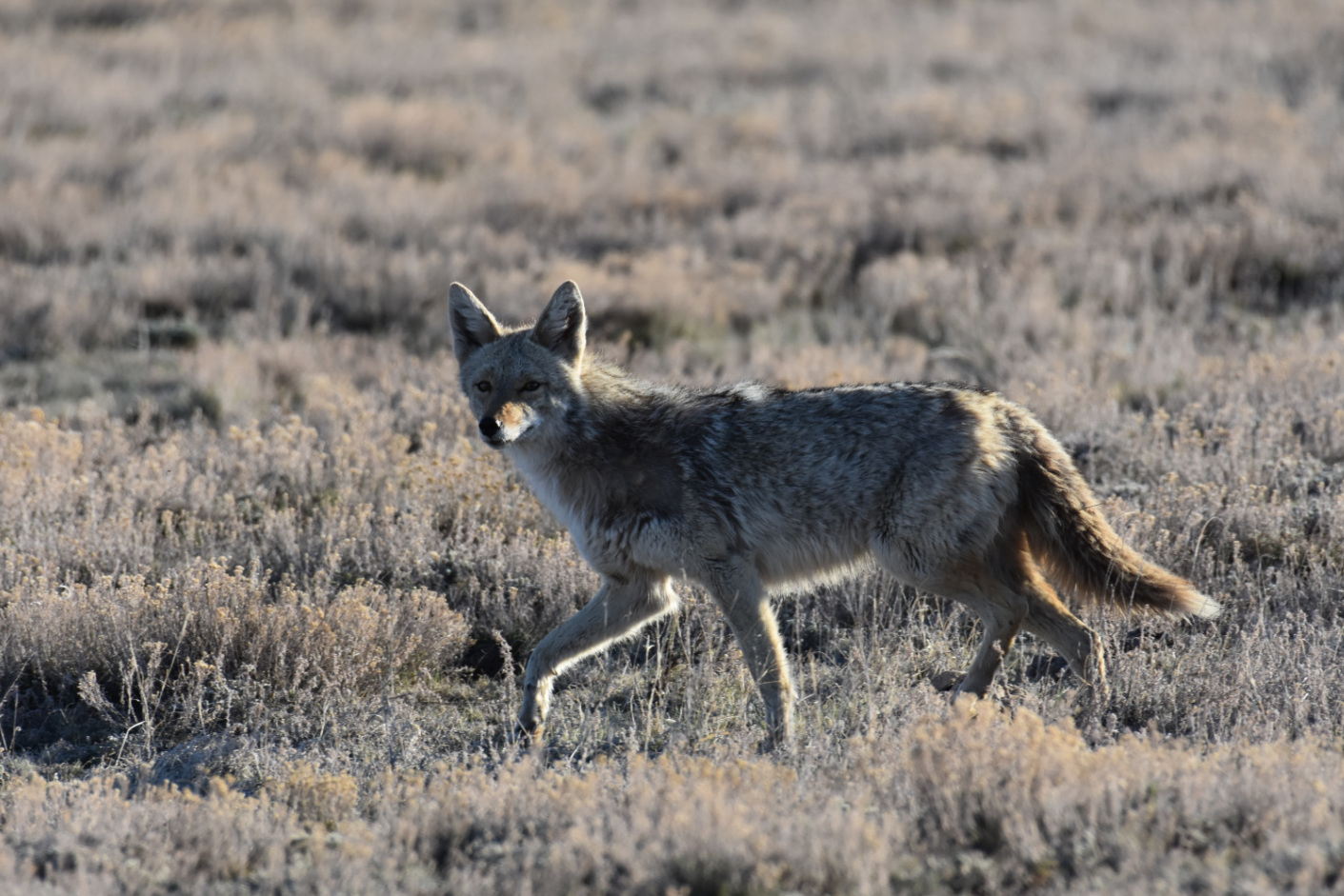
A Mearns' coyote (Canis latrans mearnsi) in the refuge on May 4, 2020.

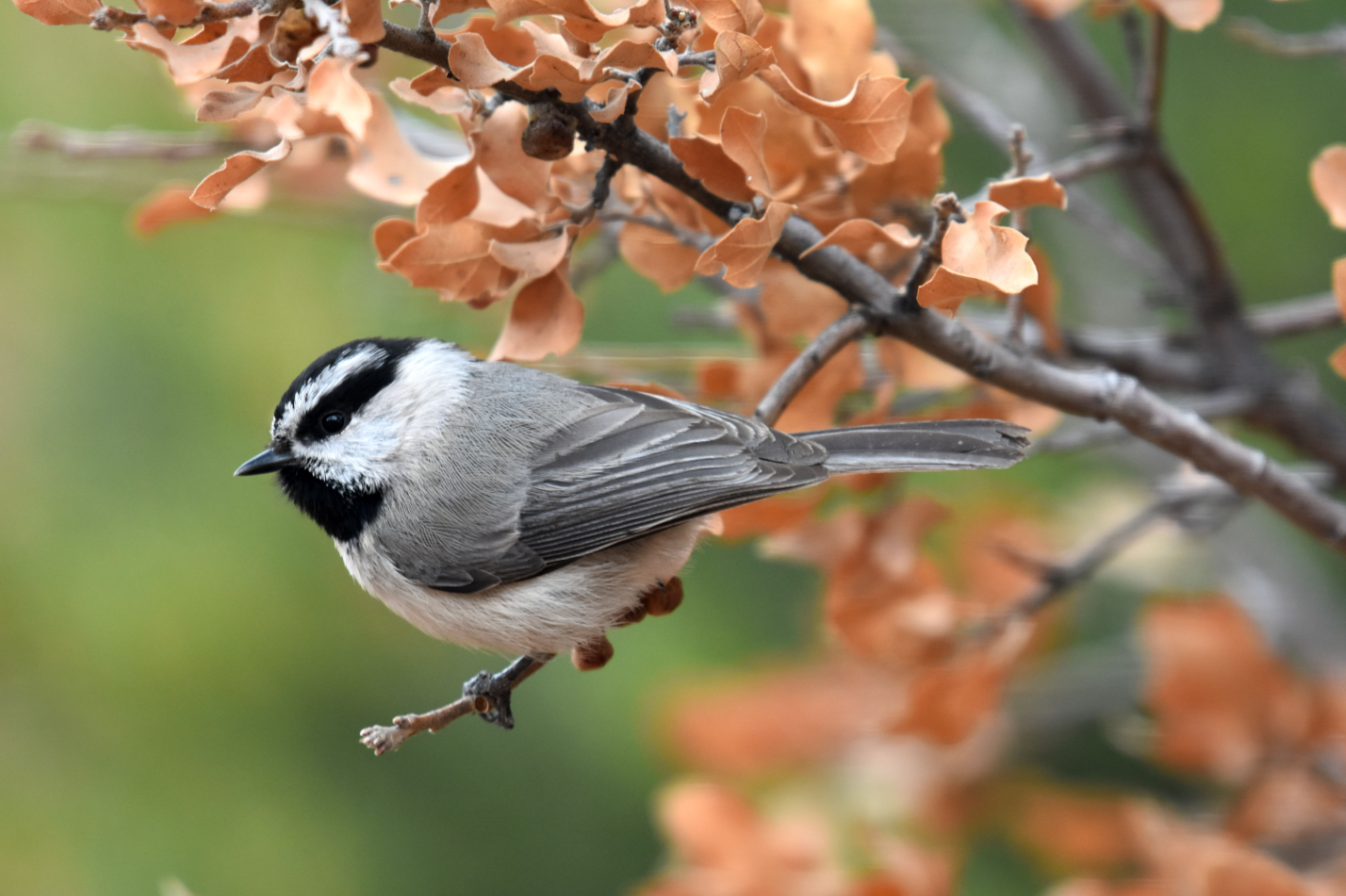
A mountain chickadee (Poecile gambeli) perches in the refuge.

The Rio Mora National Wildlife Refuge includes a variety of habitats which support a wide range of animal and plant life. Shortgrass prairie, riparian wetlands, and pinyon (or piñon) pine (genus Pinus)/juniper (genus Juniperus), oak (genus Quercus), and coniferous forests all lie in the refuge. Cactus (family Cactaceae) flowers bloom in the refuge in the spring and early summer, and sunflowers (genus Helianthus) also grow there, attracting insects such as bumblebees (genus Bombus).

The refuge is home to a herd of American bison (Bison bison). Cougars (Puma concolor), elk (Cervus canadensis), and Mearns coyotes (Canis latrans mearnsi) also are found there.

Birds that either reside in, winter in, or migrate through the refuge include the Canada goose (Branta canadensis), eastern wild turkey (Meleagris gallopavo silvestris), Eurasian (or white-rumped) whimbrel (Numenius phaeopus), greater roadrunner (Geococcyx californianus), green-tailed towhee (Pipilo chlorurus), horned lark (Eremophila alpestris), loggerhead shrike (Lanius ludovicianus), meadowlark (genus Sturnella), mountain chickadee (Poecile gambeli), northern flicker (Colaptes auratus), pinyon jay (Gymnorhinus cyanocephalus), and Townsend's warbler (Setophaga townsendi).

The territory of the refuge and that of the Rio Mora Conservation Area as a whole support endangered species like the New Mexico meadow jumping mouse (Zapus hudsonius luteus) and migrating birds like the long-billed curlew (Numenius americanus). The Audubon Society has declared the refuge an Important Bird Area.

== History ==
After moving from New York City to Santa Fe, New Mexico, philanthropists Eugene V. and Clare E. Thaw purchased the Wind River Ranch outside Watrous for recreational use. In 2004, Eugene Thaw began to explore the possibility of donating the ranch to a non-governmental organization (NGO) for use in conservation and education efforts. He initially approached the Wildlife Conservation Society, but it rejected his offer. In 2005 Thaw created the Wind River Ranch Foundation to carry out conservation, restoration, research, and educational functions on the land.

Between 2007 and 2010, Thaw offered the ranch property to several NGOs, but the economic effects of the Great Recession of 2007–2009 made them reluctant to accept it without a full endowment. In 2010, the United States Fish and Wildlife Service (USFWS) approached the discouraged Thaw and offered to purchase the ranch from him and establish a new National Wildlife Refuge on it to be named the Rio Mora National Wildlife Refuge. Thaw countered that he would donate — rather than sell — the land to the USFWS for the purpose of establishing the refuge if it agreed to use the refuge designation to preserve native species and allow the Pueblo of Pojoaque, a Native American tribe, to continue to graze its bison on the land. Budget cuts between 2010 and 2012 left the USFWS without the funds necessary to staff the proposed refuge, so in 2012 Thaw donated US$1,715,000 to the Denver Zoo in Denver, Colorado, so that the zoo could staff and manage the refuge for the Fish and Wildlife Service through the end of 2019.

The USFWS hosted three public meetings in the local area about the transformation of the Wind River Ranch into the new refuge; the meetings attracted 200 attendees who expressed unanimous support for the plans. With the financial arrangements and legal requirements complete, the Thaws donated the Wind River Ranch to the USFWS on September 27, 2012, for use in protecting the Mora River watershed and providing education about the natural and cultural heritage of the area. The same day, United States Secretary of the Interior Ken Salazar dedicated the Rio Mora National Wildlife Refuge on the property. The Rio Mora Conservation Area was established the same day in conjunction with the creation of the refuge.

== Management ==
The USFWS manages the Rio Mora National Wildlife Refuge as part of the Northern New Mexico National Wildlife Refuge Complex, which also includes the Las Vegas National Wildlife Refuge and the Maxwell National Wildlife Refuge. At the Rio Mora National Wildlife Refuge, the USFWS partners with the Denver Zoo, the Pueblo of Pojoaque tribe, and New Mexico Highlands University in its management efforts. By March 2019, the refuge's staff had grown to 3 1/2 full-time equivalents.

== Activities ==
The Rio Mora National Wildlife Refuge is dedicated to the conservation, management, and restoration of the fish, wildlife, and plants and their habitats within its boundaries. It partners with many organizations and facilitates research, outreach, interpretation, and environment education. The USFWS, the Denver Zoo, the Pueblo of Pojoaque tribe, and New Mexico Highlands University together operate the Rio Mora Conservation Science Center at the refuge.

The Wind River Ranch Foundation began conservation and restoration efforts in 2005, and the refuge has continued the work since its creation in 2012. This work has included restoration of the Mora River's meanders and floodplain, mitigation of the negative effects of arroyos formed by ranch roads that have disrupted the flow of water to downslope grasslands, and building rock structures in arroyos to raise the water table, recharge springs, and restore wetlands. The techniques used are designed to be suitable for export to areas outside the refuge in need of similar ecological restoration.

The refuge has also carried on the foundation's research and educational work. Between January 2005 and March 2019, the foundation and refuge combined to host 44 scientific studies, 55 internships (from the Denver Zoo, New Mexico Highlands University, and the United States Department of the Interior's Bureau of Indian Affairs, and including interns from Haiti and Mexico as well as the United States), and over 5,000 students from 19 school districts and 11 universities who visited to learn about conservation challenges and participate in citizen science projects. The refuge focuses on science, technology, engineering, and mathematics (STEM) education, running several competitive intern programs sponsored by Colorado-based universities each year and particularly focusing on encouraging and supporting STEM education for New Mexico students.

The refuge maintains strong ties with the Pueblo of Pojoaque tribe, whose bison herd is beneficial to habitat restoration projects in the refuge and is of cultural importance to the tribe. In 2018, and again in June 2019, the refuge hosted two of the largest tribal youth camps in New Mexico.

== Recreation ==
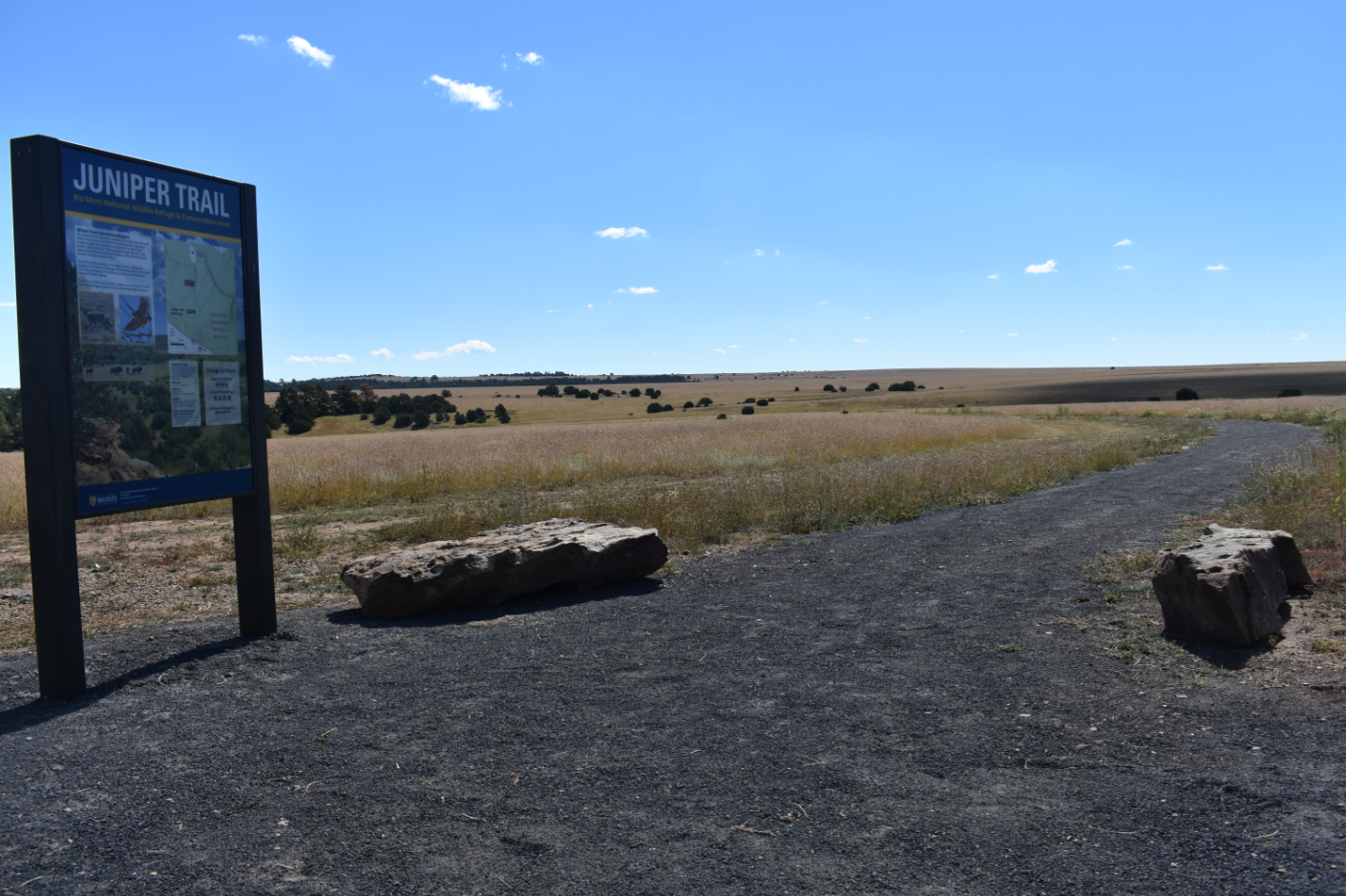
The trailhead of the Juniper Trail on October 5, 2022.

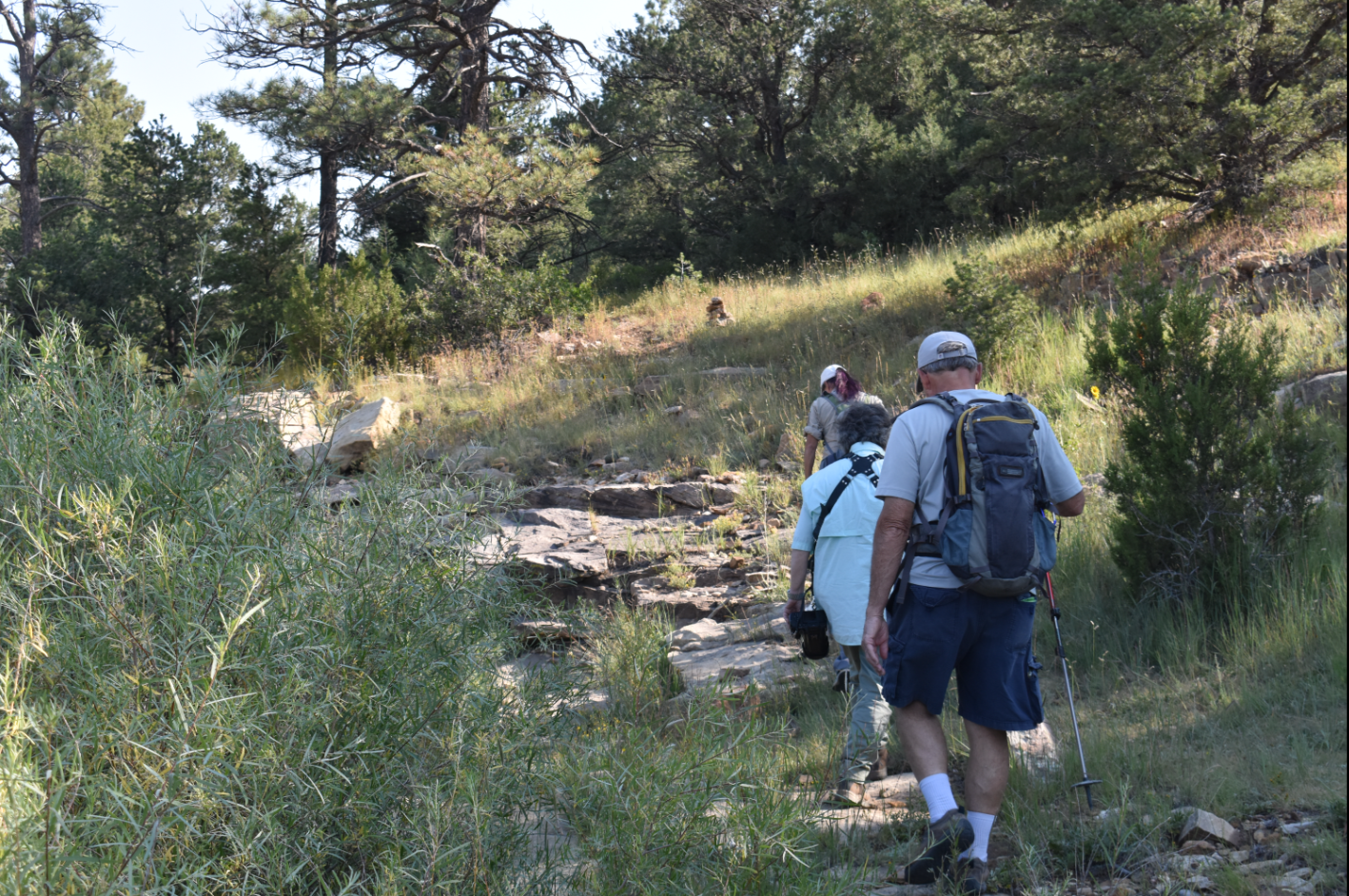
People hiking on the Juniper Trail on October 7, 2022.

Admission to the Rio Mora National Wildlife is free of charge. Public access is limited to the Juniper Trail, Loma Parda County Road, New Mexico State Road 161, and special events held in the refuge. Wildlife observation and wildlife photography are permitted along the two roads. A public vault toilet is available at the Juniper Trail parking area.

The Juniper Trail is a rocky, dirt loop trail that offers visitors a choice between a 2.25-mile (3.6 km) hike that takes about an hour to complete and a 0.25-mile (0.4 km) walk that takes about 15 minutes. It is suitable for running as well as hiking and walking. It passes over rolling hills through scattered trees and desert shrubland, rising 190 feet (58 m) to rocky bluffs where an overlook provides a scenic view of the Mora River and the Sangre De Cristo Mountains in the distance.
