= Holly Coors =

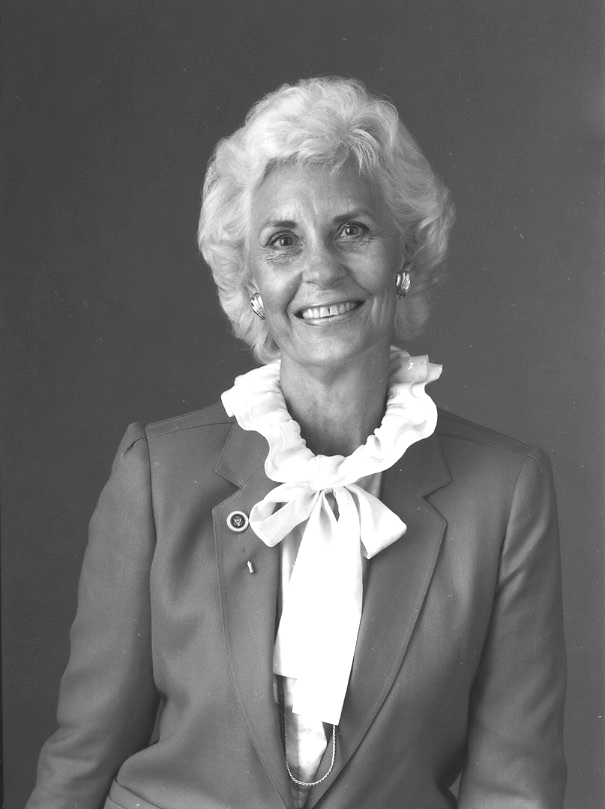
- Coors in 1983
- Born: Edith Holland Hanson; August 25, 1920; Bangor, Maine, U.S.
- Died: January 18, 2009 (aged 88); Golden, Colorado, U.S.
- Spouse: Joseph Coors (m. 1941; div. 1987)
- Children: 5, including Pete

Edith Holland "Holly" Coors (née Hanson; August 25, 1920 – January 18, 2009) was an American conservative political activist and philanthropist who had been married to Joseph Coors, the president of Coors Brewing Company.

== Early life ==
Coors was born Edith Holland Hanson on August 25, 1920, in Bangor, Maine.

== Career ==
She moved to New York City, where she worked as a model and considered becoming a fashion designer.

While considering running for election as Governor of Colorado in 1985, Coors told The Denver Post that the best way to help women was "not the Equal Rights Amendment but through free enterprise".

Coors served on the boards of The Heritage Foundation and the Federalist Society. She founded and was president of Women of our Hemisphere Achieving Together, an organization that assists women from Central America and the Dominican Republic, and served in senior positions for many other institutions and organizations. She was named to serve on the Board of Visitors of the United States Air Force Academy by President Ronald Reagan, who also appointed her goodwill ambassador for the Western Hemisphere during the National Year of the Americas (NYOTA). She was named to the White House Fellows Commission by President George H. W. Bush.

== Personal life ==
In 1941, she married Joseph Coors, then chief operating officer of Coors Brewing Company, who she met in Nantucket, Massachusetts. The couple had five sons, Joe Jr., Jeff, Pete, Grover and John, before divorcing in 1987; Joseph died in 2003.

== Death ==
Coors died at age 88 on January 18, 2009, at her home in Golden, Colorado. She was survived by her five sons, 28 grandchildren, and 24 great-grandchildren.
