= 1998 Colorado Attorney General election =

- November 3, 1998
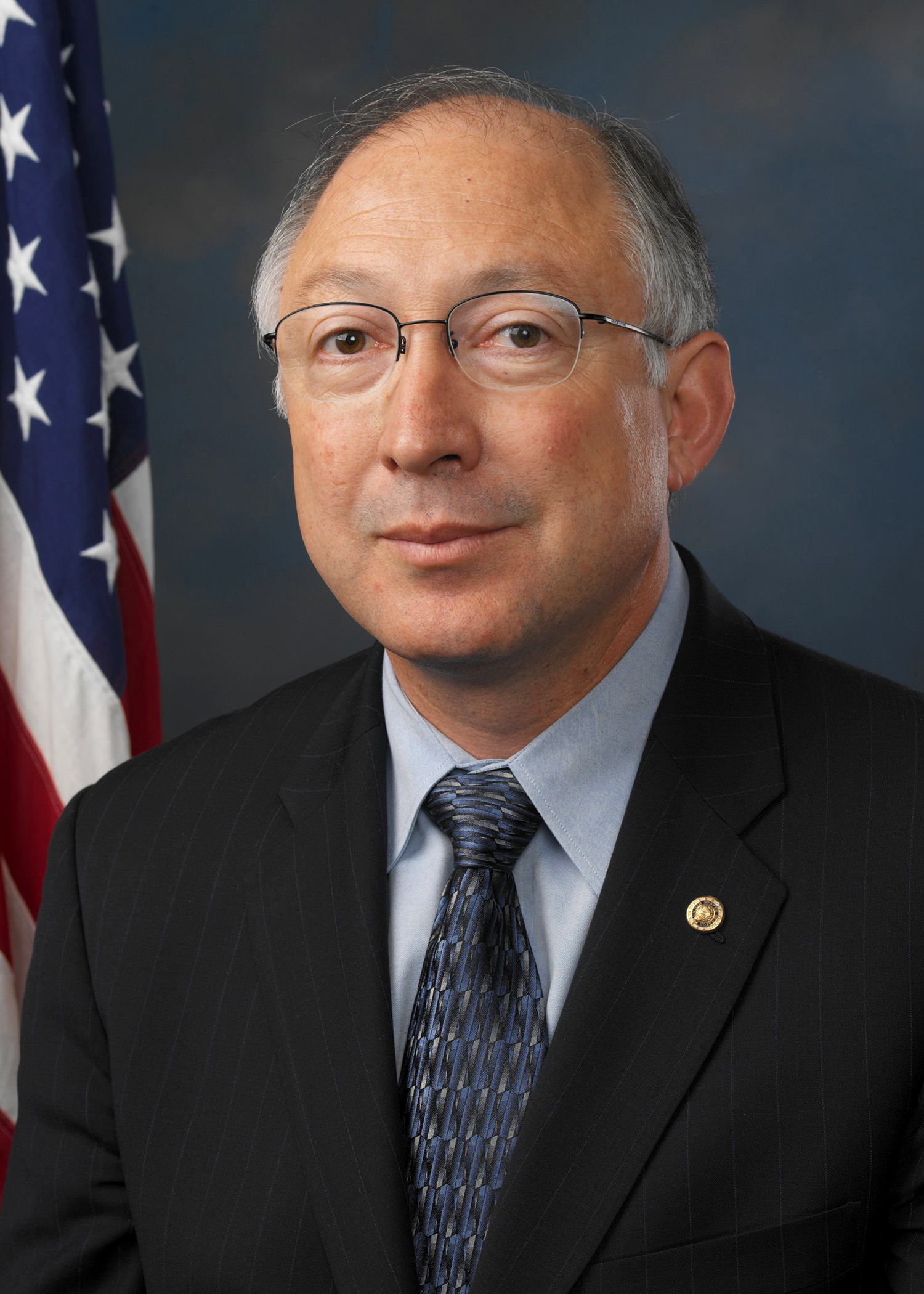

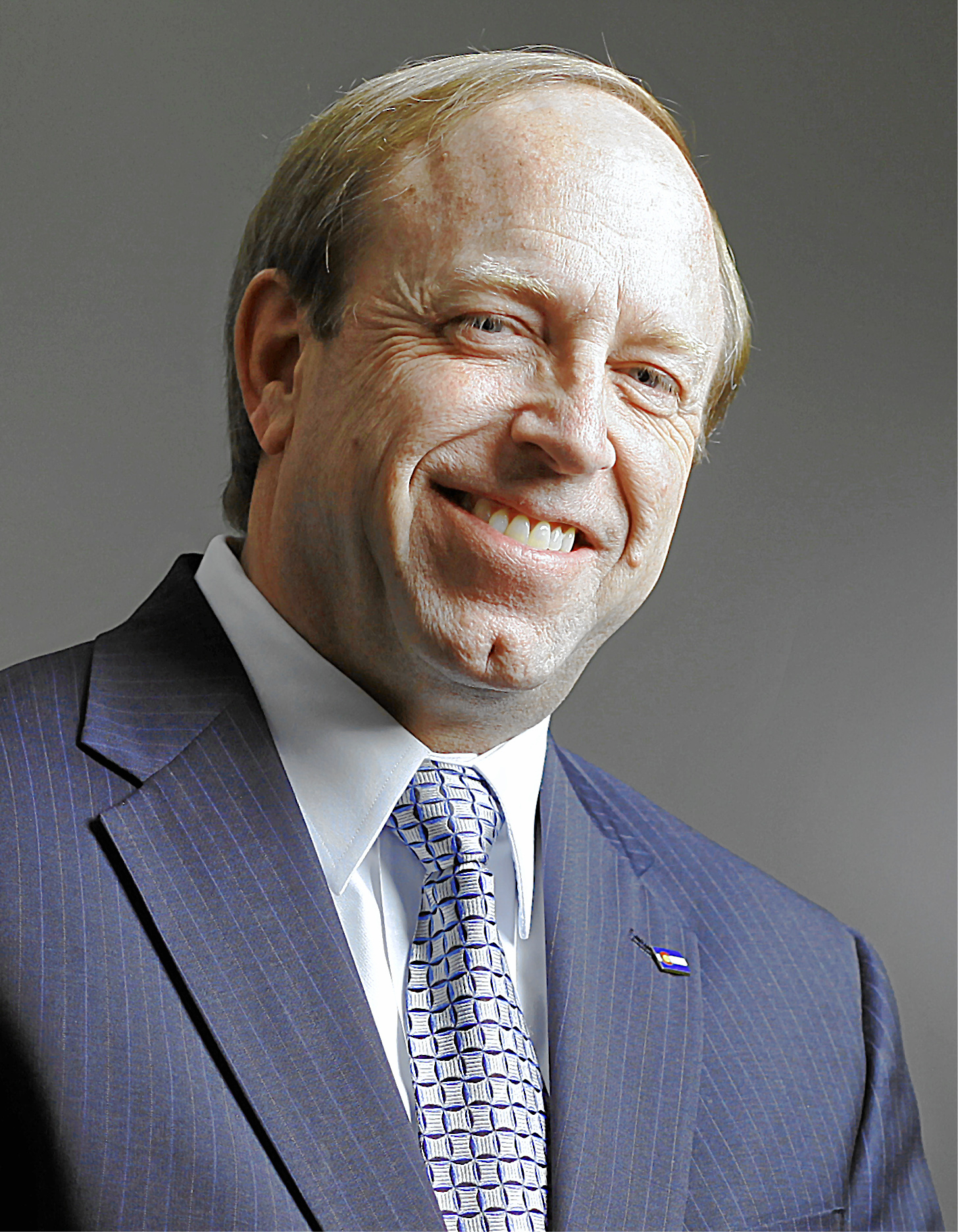
Nominee	Ken Salazar	John Suthers
Party	Democratic	Republican
Popular vote	634,159	601,774
Percentage	49.96%	47.41%
- County results Salazar: 40–50% 50–60% 60–70% 70–80% 80–90% Suthers: 40–50% 50–60% 60–70%
Attorney General before election
Gale Norton
Republican
Elected Attorney General
Ken Salazar
Democratic

The 1998 Colorado Attorney General election was held on November 3, 1998, to elect the Colorado Attorney General. Republican incumbent Gale Norton was term-limited and ineligible to seek a third consecutive term. Democratic nominee, lawyer, and former Executive Director of the Colorado Department of Natural Resources Ken Salazar won the election, defeating Republican nominee and former District Attorney for the 4th Judicial District of Colorado John Suthers by two percentage points and winning a plurality of the vote.

== Republican primary ==
=== Candidates ===
- John Suthers, former District Attorney for the 4th Judicial District of Colorado (1989–1997)

=== Results ===
Republican primary results
Party	Candidate	Votes	%
Republican	John Suthers	118,139	100.00%
Total votes		118,139	100.00%

== Democratic primary ==
=== Candidates ===
- Ken Salazar, lawyer and former Executive Director of the Colorado Department of Natural Resources (1990–1994) (Democratic)

=== Results ===
Democratic primary results
Party	Candidate	Votes	%
Democratic	Ken Salazar	115,815	100.00%
Total votes		115,815	100.00%

== General election ==
=== Candidates ===
- Ken Salazar, lawyer and former Executive Director of the Colorado Department of Natural Resources (1990–1994) (Democratic)
- John Suthers, former District Attorney for the 4th Judicial District of Colorado (1989–1997) (Republican)

=== Results ===
1998 Colorado Attorney General election results
Party	Candidate	Votes	%	±%
Democratic	Ken Salazar	634,159	49.96%	+12.29%
Republican	John Suthers	601,774	47.41%	−14.92%
Libertarian	Wayne White	33,470	2.64%	N/A
Total votes		1,269,403	100.00%	
Democratic gain from Republican				
