= Pete Coors =

American businessman and politician

Peter Hanson Coors (born September 20, 1946) is an American businessman and politician. He formerly served as the chairman of the Molson Coors Brewing Company and chairman of MillerCoors.

Coors was the Republican Party nominee in the 2004 United States Senate election in Colorado.

== Early life ==
Coors was born in Golden, Colorado. He is the great-grandson of Adolph Coors, the brewing entrepreneur, and the son of Holly Coors (born Edith Holland Hanson) and Joseph Coors. He graduated from Phillips Exeter Academy and then from Cornell University from which he received a degree in engineering. A member of the Psi Upsilon fraternity, Coors was elected to the Sphinx Head Society during his final year at Cornell. He also received his MBA from the University of Denver in 1970.

== Career ==
Coors has worked all of his life in various positions at his family's firm, the Coors Brewing Company.

In 1993, Coors became vice chairman and CEO of the company, and in 2002, he was named chairman of Coors Brewing Company and Adolph Coors Company. In 2004, according to the Rocky Mountain News, Coors "made $332,402 in salary and a $296,917 bonus as chairman of Adolph Coors. He also received 125,000 stock options with a potential value of $13 million". He stepped down temporarily from these positions in 2004 to run for the US Senate. After the 2005 merger with Molson, Coors became a Class A Director in the newly formed Molson Coors Brewing Company.

On May 7, 2018, Coors wrote an open letter criticizing the hostility toward "Big Beer," i.e., large brewing companies, at a Craft Brewers Conference sponsored by the Brewers Association. "The leadership of the Brewers Association does a great disservice to the entire beer value chain by attempting to pit one part of the industry against another," he charged.

In a May 14, 2018 opinion piece for the Wall Street Journal, Coors urged President Trump to put an end to the Midwest Premium, a "mysterious fee" added to aluminum orders in the U.S. "It is time to fix this mess and end the premium once and for all," he wrote. "A private solution would be best — one crafted by producers, buyers, market makers and customers like Molson Coors. Let us forge a new deal on aluminum, to the benefit of a hundred million fans of the most American of beverages. President Trump, are you with us?"

At the end of 2019, Coors retired from his role as the company's chief customer relations officer. He remains a company ambassador.

=== Board memberships and other professional activities ===
In October 2006, he was appointed by the University of Colorado Hospital board of directors as chairman of the board for the new University of Colorado Hospital Foundation.

He has served on the boards of U.S. Bancorp, H. J. Heinz Company, HOBY (Hugh O'Brian Youth Leadership) Colorado, and Energy Corp. of America. He is also involved in civic organizations such as the Denver Area Council of the Boy Scouts of America and the National Western Stock Show Association. He is also part of the ownership group of the Colorado Rockies. He is a member of the Augusta National Golf Club in Augusta, Georgia. In 1997, Coors was granted an honorary doctorate from Johnson & Wales University, where he is a trustee. He sits on the board of trustees of the American Enterprise Institute.

== Politics ==
When U.S. Senator Ben Nighthorse Campbell declared in 2004 that he was retiring, Coors announced his candidacy. His opponent in the Republican primary election was another conservative, former congressman Bob Schaffer. During their primary, the two candidates engaged in an ideological disagreement, with Schaffer attacking Coors because his company had provided benefits to the partners of its gay and lesbian employees, in addition to promoting its beer in gay bars. Coors defended himself by saying that he was opposed to same-sex marriage, and supported a constitutional amendment to ban it, although he noted that he supported civil unions for gay couples. According to the Rocky Mountain News, Coors described his company's pro-LGBT practices as "good business, separate from politics." He defeated Schaffer with 61% of the vote in the primary, with many analysts citing his high name recognition in the state as a primary factor.

Coors faced Democrat and Colorado Attorney General Ken Salazar in the November 2004 election, and was defeated by a margin of 51% to 47%.

According to the non-partisan OpenSecrets, Coors gave his own campaign $1,213,657 and received individual donations of $60,550 from other Coors family members. He was mentioned as a possible contender in the 2008 Senate election.

=== Election results ===
Colorado U.S. Senate Race 2004
Party	Candidate	Votes	%	±%
Democratic	Ken Salazar	1,081,188	51.3	
Republican	Pete Coors	980,668	47.4	

Coors has been described as "a major donor in Colorado politics." In 2016, Coors donated $5,000 to Leadership Matters for America, a super PAC supporting the presidential candidacy of Donald Trump, and $5,000 to Right to Rise, which supported Jeb Bush.

== Personal life ==
Coors is married to Marilyn Coors (born Grosso) and has six children.

On May 28, 2006, Coors was arrested by the Colorado State Patrol on suspicion of driving under the influence and registering a blood alcohol level higher than the legal limit (0.08). Coors commented on the incident, saying, "I should have planned ahead for a ride. For years, I've advocated the responsible use of our company's products. That's still my message, and our company's message. I am sorry that I didn't follow it myself."

On August 25, 2006, Coors pleaded guilty to a lesser charge of driving while impaired. A judge sentenced Coors to 24 hours of community service and a suspended fine and ordered him to undergo alcohol education courses.

== See also ==
- Wise Use Movement
- List of richest American politicians

Party political offices
Preceded by Ben Nighthorse Campbell	Republican Party nominee for United States Senator from Colorado (Class 3); 2004	Succeeded by Ken Buck
