= 2004 United States Senate election in Colorado =

- November 2, 2004
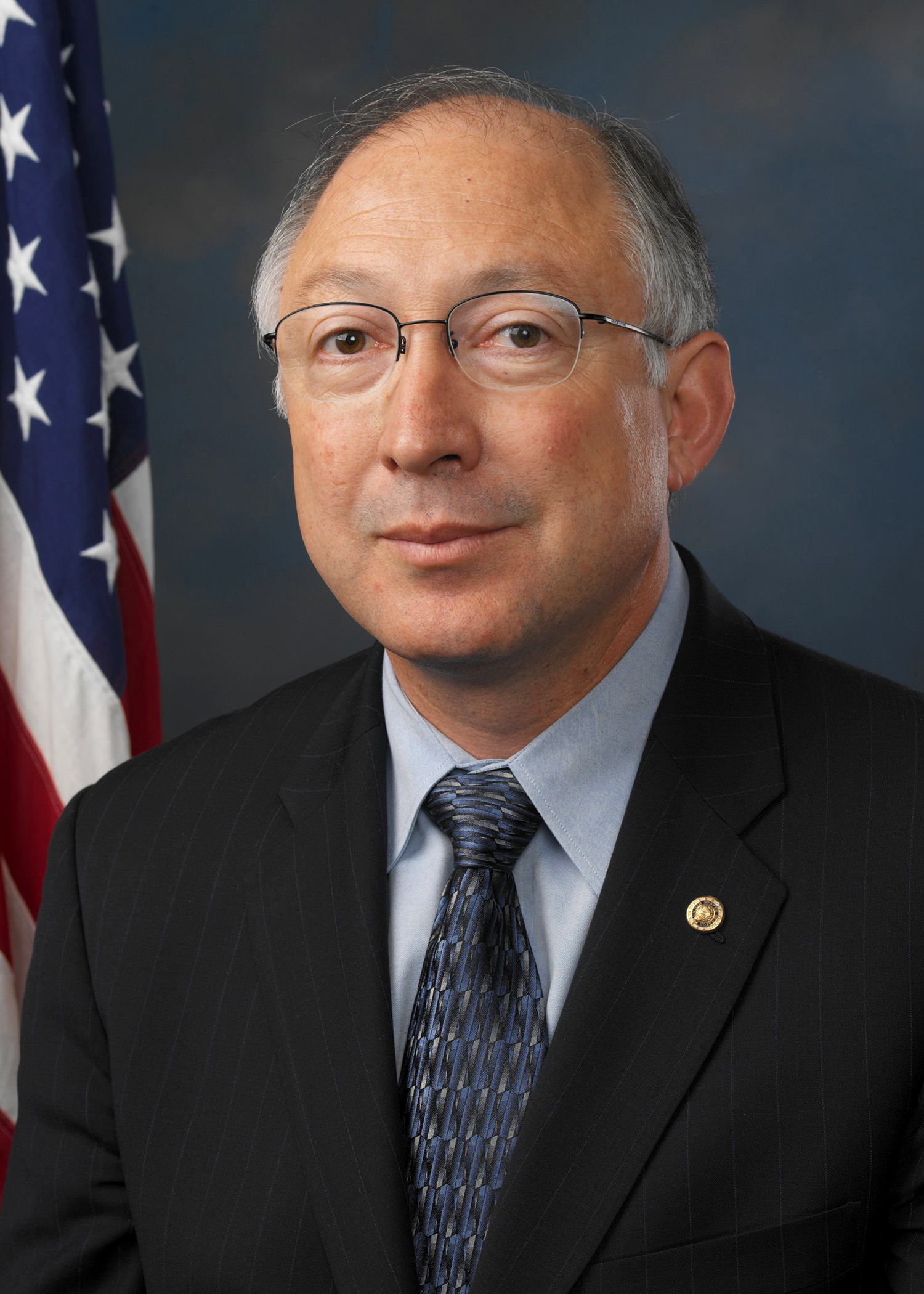

Nominee	Ken Salazar	Pete Coors
Party	Democratic	Republican
Popular vote	1,081,188	980,668
Percentage	51.30%	46.53%
- County results Salazar: 40–50% 50–60% 60–70% 70–80% Coors: 40–50% 50–60% 60–70%
U.S. senator before election
Ben Nighthorse Campbell
Republican
Elected U.S. Senator
Ken Salazar
Democratic

The 2004 United States Senate election in Colorado took place on November 2, 2004, alongside other elections to the United States Senate in other states as well as elections to the United States House of Representatives and various state and local elections. Incumbent Senator Ben Nighthorse Campbell (first elected in 1992 as a Democrat and re-elected in 1998 as a Republican, having switched parties in 1995) retired instead of seeking a third term. Democratic nominee Ken Salazar won the open seat, defeating Republican nominee Pete Coors despite Republican President George W. Bush carrying the state over John Kerry in the concurrent presidential race.

== Background ==
On March 3, 2004, incumbent Republican Senator Ben Nighthorse Campbell announced that he would not seek reelection due to health concerns, having recently been treated for prostate cancer and heartburn. Before Campbell's retirement, no prominent Democrat had entered the race, with educator Mike Miles and businessman Rutt Bridges pursuing the Democratic nomination. After Campbell's retirement, many expected popular Republican Governor Bill Owens to enter the race, however he declined to run. Campbell's retirement and Owens' decision not to run prompted a number of prominent Democrats to reexamine the race.

== Democratic primary ==
=== Candidates ===
- Ken Salazar, Attorney General of Colorado
- Mike Miles, educator

=== Campaign ===
On March 10, the same day Owens announced he would not run, U.S. Congressman Mark Udall entered the race. The next day, state Attorney General Ken Salazar entered the race, leading Udall to immediately withdraw and endorse him; Udall held Colorado's other Senate seat from 2009 to 2015. Salazar lost to Mike Miles at the State nominating convention. In spite of this loss, the national Democratic Party backed Salazar with contributions from the DSCC and promotion of Salazar as the only primary candidate.

=== Polling ===
Poll source	Date(s) administered	Sample size (Note: Key: A – all adults RV – registered voters LV – likely voters V – unclear)	Margin of error	Ken Salazar	Mike Miles	Other	Undecided
Mason-Dixon (Note: Poll sponsored by The Denver Post)	August 2004	– (LV)	–	67%	21%	–	12%
Mason-Dixon	June 15–18, 2004	300 (LV)	± 6.0%	61%	15%	–	24%

=== Results ===
Democratic primary results by county Salazar: 50–60%; 60–70%; 70–80%; 80–90%; >90%; Miles: 50–60%; 60–70%

Democratic Primary results
Party	Candidate	Votes	%
Democratic	Ken Salazar	173,167	73.02%
Democratic	Mike Miles	63,973	26.98%
Total votes		237,140	100.00%

== Republican primary ==
=== Candidates ===
- Pete Coors, former CEO and chairman of Coors Brewing Company
- Bob Schaffer, U.S. Representative

Declined

- Bob Beauprez, U.S. representative from Colorado's 7th congressional district
- Dave Liniger, real estate magnate
- Scott McInnis, U.S. representative from Colorado's 3rd congressional district
- Jim Nicholson, U.S. Ambassador to the Holy See
- Jane Norton, Lieutenant Governor of Colorado

=== Endorsements ===
Pete Coors

Elected officials

- Ben Nighthorse Campbell, incumbent U.S. senator
- Bill Owens, Governor of Colorado (previously endorsed Schaffer)
Bob Schaffer

Elected officials

- ~~Bill Owens, Governor of Colorado~~ (switched endorsement to Coors)

=== Campaign ===
The two candidates got into an ideological battle, as Schaffer attacked Coors because his company had provided benefits to the partners of its gay and lesbian employees, in addition to promoting its beer in gay bars. Coors defended himself by saying that he was opposed to same-sex marriage and supported a constitutional amendment to ban it, although he noted that he supported civil unions for gay couples. According to the Rocky Mountain News, Coors described his company's pro-LGBT practices as "good business, separate from politics."

=== Polling ===
Poll source	Date(s) administered	Sample size	Margin of error	Pete Coors	Bob Schaffer	Other	Undecided
Mason-Dixon	August 2004	– (LV)	–	45%	41%	–	14%
Tarrance Group (R) (Note: Poll sponsored by Coors' campaign)	July 14–15, 2004	500 (LV)	± 4.5%	53%	34%	–	13%
Mason-Dixon	June 15–18, 2004	300 (LV)	± 6.0%	39%	35%	–	26%

=== Results ===
Republican primary results by county Coors: 50–60%; 60–70%; 70–80%; 80–90%; Schaffer: 50–60%; 60–70%

Coors defeated Schaffer with 61% of the vote in the primary, with many analysts citing his high name recognition in the state as a primary factor.

Republican Primary results
Party	Candidate	Votes	%
Republican	Pete Coors	203,157	60.57%
Republican	Bob Schaffer	132,274	39.43%
Total votes		335,431	100.00%

== General election ==
=== Candidates ===
==== Major ====
- Pete Coors (R), former CEO and chairman of Coors Brewing Company
- Ken Salazar (D), State Attorney General

==== Minor ====
- Douglas Campbell (C)
- Victor Good (Re)
- Finn Gotaas (I)
- John Harris (I)
- Richard Randall (L)

=== Campaign ===
Pete Coors, Chairman of Coors Brewing Company, ran as a moderate conservative. However, Salazar was also a moderate and a highly popular State Attorney General. Coors is also a great-grandson of Adolph Coors, founder of the brewing company. His father is Joseph Coors, president of the company and a founding member of The Heritage Foundation. Salazar narrowly won the open seat. It was one of only two Democratic pickups in the 2004 Senate elections (Illinois was the other).

=== Debates ===
- Complete video of debate, October 29, 2004

=== Finances ===
According to OpenSecrets, Coors gave his own campaign $1,213,657 and received individual donations of $60,550 from other Coors family members.

A state record total of over $11 million was raised during the election.

=== Predictions ===
Source	Ranking	As of
Sabato's Crystal Ball	Lean D (flip)	November 1, 2004

=== Polling ===
Poll source	Date(s) administered	Sample size	Margin of error	Pete Coors (R)	Ken Salazar (D)	Other	Undecided
Reuters/Zogby International	October 29 – November 1, 2004	600 (LV)	± 4.1%	44%	52%	1%	3%
SurveyUSA (Note: Poll conducted for KUSA-TV)	October 30–31, 2004	701 (LV)	± 3.8%	47%	51%	–	2%
Reuters/Zogby International	October 28–31, 2004	600 (LV)	± 4.0%	44%	52%	–	4%
Reuters/Zogby International	October 27–30, 2004	600 (LV)	± 4.1%	46%	49%	1%	4%
Reuters/Zogby International	October 26–29, 2004	600 (LV)	± 4.1%	45%	50%	2%	3%
Reuters/Zogby International	October 25–28, 2004	600 (LV)	± 4.1%	43%	52%	1%	4%
Public Opinion Strategies (R) (Note: Poll sponsored by Rocky Mountain News & KCNC-TV)	October 25–27, 2004	500 (LV)	± 4.3%	42%	48%	–	4%
Mason-Dixon	October 25–27, 2004	625 (LV)	± 4.8%	46%	46%	1% (Note: "Someone else" with 1%)	7%
Reuters/Zogby International	October 24–27, 2004	600 (LV)	± 4.1%	42%	53%	1%	4%
Reuters/Zogby International	October 23–26, 2004	600 (LV)	± 4.1%	43%	53%	–	4%
Reuters/Zogby International	October 22–25, 2004	600 (LV)	± 4.1%	44%	50%	–	6%
Reuters/Zogby International	October 21–24, 2004	600 (LV)	± 4.1%	42%	51%	–	7%
SurveyUSA (Note: Poll conducted for KUSA-TV & KOAA-TV)	October 18–20, 2004	596 (LV)	± 4.1%	50%	46%	3%	1%
Ciruli Associates (Note: Poll sponsored by The Pueblo Chieftain)	October 15–19, 2004	600 (RV)	± 4.0%	43%	47%	–	10%
Rasmussen Reports	October 18, 2004	500 (LV)	± 4.5%	49%	48%	2%	1%
Gallup/CNN/USA Today	October 14–17, 2004	666 (LV)	± 4.0%	48%	49%	–	3%
Gallup/CNN/USA Today	October 14–17, 2004	815 (RV)	± 4.0%	45%	51%	–	4%
Public Opinion Strategies (R)	October 13–15, 2004	400 (V)	± 4.9%	45%	40%	6%	6%
SurveyUSA	October 5–7, 2004	594 (LV)	± 4.1%	48%	48%	3%	1%
Mason-Dixon	October 4–6, 2004	630 (RV)	± 4.0%	44%	46%	1%	9%
Gallup/CNN/USA Today	October 3–6, 2004	667 (LV)	± 5.0%	43%	54%	–	3%
Gallup/CNN/USA Today	October 3–6, 2004	820 (RV)	± 4.0%	43%	53%	–	4%
SurveyUSA	September 21–23, 2004	625 (LV)	± 4.0%	51%	46%	3%	–
Rasmussen Reports	September 16, 2004	500 (LV)	± 4.3%	49%	48%	1%	1%
Ciruli Associates	September 14–18, 2004	600 (RV)	± 4.0%	45%	46%	–	9%
Tarrance Group (R)	September 14–16, 2004	–	± 4.5%	44%	46%	–	10%
Public Opinion Strategies (R)	September 12–13, 2004	500 (LV)	± 4.3%	42%	53%	1%	4%
Tarrance Group (R)	August 24–26, 2004	600 (LV)	± 4.0%	43%	47%	–	10%
Rasmussen Reports	August 19, 2004	500 (LV)	± 4.5%	45%	49%	2%	4%
SurveyUSA	August 14–16, 2004	618 (LV)	± 4.0%	48%	47%	4%	1%
Harstad Strategic Research (D) (Note: Poll sponsored by Salazar's campaign)	August 2004	–	± 3.5%	42%	48%	–	10%
Mason-Dixon	June 15–18, 2004	800 (RV)	± 3.5%	40%	47%	–	13%
Public Opinion Strategies (R)	April 20–24, 2004	600 (RV)	–	36%	52%	–	12%
Rasmussen Reports	April 14, 2004	500 (LV)	± 4.3%	41%	47%	3%	8%

Hypothetical polling

Bob Schaffer vs. Ken Salazar

Poll source	Date(s) administered	Sample size	Margin of error	Bob Schaffer (R)	Ken Salazar (D)	Other	Undecided
Mason-Dixon	June 15–18, 2004	800 (RV)	± 3.5%	35%	49%	–	16%
Public Opinion Strategies (R)	April 20–24, 2004	600 (RV)	–	37%	48%	–	15%
Rasmussen Reports	April 14, 2004	500 (LV)	± 4.3%	37%	49%	5%	9%

Pete Coors vs. Mike Miles

Poll source	Date(s) administered	Sample size	Margin of error	Pete Coors (R)	Mike Miles (D)	Other	Undecided
Mason-Dixon	June 15–18, 2004	800 (RV)	± 3.5%	45%	30%	–	25%

Bob Schaffer vs. Mike Miles

Poll source	Date(s) administered	Sample size	Margin of error	Bob Schaffer (R)	Mike Miles (D)	Other	Undecided
Mason-Dixon	June 15–18, 2004	800 (RV)	± 3.5%	43%	29%	–	28%

=== Results ===
General election results
Party	Candidate	Votes	%	±%
Democratic	Ken Salazar	1,081,188	51.30%	+16.29%
Republican	Pete Coors	980,668	46.53%	−15.96%
Constitution	Douglas Campbell	18,783	0.89%	+0.15%
Libertarian	Richard Randall	10,160	0.48%	
Independent	John R. Harris	8,442	0.40%	
Reform	Victor Good	6,481	0.31%	
Independent	Finn Gotaas	1,750	0.08%	
Majority		100,520	4.77%	−22.70%
Turnout		2,107,472		
Democratic gain from Republican		Swing		

==== By county ====
County	Ken Salazar Democratic		Pete Coors Republican		Other		Margin		Total votes
County	#	%	#	%	#	%	#	%	Total votes
Adams	76,101	56.37%	55,438	41.07%	3,443	2.56%	20,663	15.30%	134,982
Alamosa	3,937	63.55%	2,158	34.83%	100	1.62%	1,779	28.72%	6,195
Arapahoe	120,225	52.18%	105,921	45.98%	4,215	1.84%	14,304	6.20%	230,361
Archuleta	2,531	43.81%	3,051	52.81%	195	3.38%	-520	-9.00%	5,777
Baca	848	39.47%	1,248	58.10%	52	2.43%	-400	-18.63%	2,148
Bent	1,124	52.40%	962	44.84%	59	2.76%	162	7.56%	2,145
Boulder	106,481	67.64%	47,899	30.42%	3,034	1.94%	58,582	37.22%	157,414
Broomfield	11,940	51.94%	10,588	46.06%	457	2.00%	1,352	5.88%	22,985
Chaffee	4,229	48.60%	4,286	49.25%	186	2.15%	-57	-0.65%	8,701
Cheyenne	330	29.25%	762	67.55%	36	3.20%	-432	-38.30%	1,128
Clear Creek	3,179	56.89%	2,246	40.20%	162	2.91%	933	16.69%	5,587
Conejos	2,624	67.92%	1,177	30.46%	62	1.62%	1,447	37.46%	3,863
Costilla	1,363	75.89%	372	20.71%	61	3.40%	991	55.18%	1,796
Crowley	608	41.13%	823	55.68%	47	3.19%	-215	-14.55%	1,478
Custer	902	37.52%	1,449	60.27%	53	2.21%	-547	-22.75%	2,404
Delta	5,060	35.91%	8,598	61.03%	429	3.06%	-3,538	-25.12%	14,087
Denver	169,580	72.52%	60,387	25.82%	3,821	1.66%	109,193	46.70%	233,788
Dolores	498	44.18%	581	51.55%	48	4.27%	-83	-7.37%	1,127
Douglas	45,425	37.85%	72,911	60.76%	1,659	1.39%	-27,486	-22.91%	119,995
Eagle	10,110	55.59%	7,636	41.99%	439	2.42%	2,474	13.60%	18,185
El Paso	81,403	34.09%	151,414	63.42%	5,902	2.49%	-70,011	-29.33%	238,719
Elbert	3,497	31.14%	7,475	66.57%	256	2.29%	-3,978	-35.43%	11,228
Fremont	7,053	38.00%	10,942	58.96%	562	3.04%	-3,889	-20.96%	18,557
Garfield	9,959	48.68%	9,840	48.10%	656	3.22%	119	0.58%	20,455
Gilpin	1,815	57.20%	1,221	38.48%	137	4.32%	594	18.72%	3,173
Grand	3,560	47.18%	3,788	50.20%	197	2.62%	-228	-3.02%	7,545
Gunnison	5,280	63.24%	2,872	34.40%	196	2.36%	2,408	28.84%	8,348
Hinsdale	279	46.42%	296	49.25%	26	4.33%	-17	-2.83%	601
Huerfano	1,969	57.47%	1,364	39.81%	93	2.72%	605	17.66%	3,426
Jackson	352	37.80%	547	58.75%	32	3.45%	-195	-20.95%	931
Jefferson	137,544	50.93%	127,048	47.04%	5,462	2.03%	10,496	3.89%	270,054
Kiowa	295	33.14%	574	64.49%	21	2.37%	-279	-31.35%	890
Kit Carson	1,106	31.87%	2,284	65.82%	80	2.31%	-1,178	-33.95%	3,470
La Plata	13,989	55.75%	10,561	42.08%	542	2.17%	3,428	13.67%	25,092
Lake	1,778	60.27%	1,062	36.00%	110	3.73%	716	24.27%	2,950
Larimer	73,204	50.64%	67,597	46.76%	3,738	2.60%	5,607	3.88%	144,539
Las Animas	3,783	57.03%	2,650	39.95%	200	3.02%	1,133	17.08%	6,633
Lincoln	682	29.51%	1,580	68.36%	49	2.13%	-898	-38.85%	2,311
Logan	3,114	35.75%	5,415	62.16%	181	2.09%	-2,301	-26.41%	8,710
Mesa	21,718	35.46%	38,080	62.17%	1,444	2.37%	-16,362	-26.71%	61,242
Mineral	338	55.13%	267	43.55%	8	1.32%	71	11.58%	613
Moffat	1,966	34.52%	3,494	61.36%	234	4.12%	-1,528	-26.84%	5,694
Montezuma	4,773	43.98%	5,724	52.75%	354	3.27%	951	-8.77%	10,851
Montrose	5,603	33.99%	10,433	63.30%	444	2.71%	-4,830	-29.31%	16,480
Morgan	3,938	39.70%	5,745	57.93%	234	2.37%	-1,807	-18.23%	9,917
Otero	3,963	48.40%	4,037	49.30%	187	2.30%	-74	-0.90%	8,187
Ouray	1,315	48.73%	1,332	49.36%	51	1.91%	-17	-0.63%	2,698
Park	3,696	44.49%	4,330	52.12%	281	3.39%	-634	-7.63%	8,307
Phillips	804	35.18%	1,443	63.15%	38	1.67%	-639	-27.97%	2,285
Pitkin	6,135	67.41%	2,783	30.57%	183	2.02%	3,352	36.84%	9,101
Prowers	1,987	42.07%	2,628	55.64%	108	2.29%	-641	-13.57%	4,723
Pueblo	39,687	59.06%	26,160	38.93%	1,340	2.01%	13,527	20.13%	67,187
Rio Blanco	871	29.16%	2,004	67.11%	111	3.73%	-1,133	-37.95%	2,986
Rio Grande	2,854	51.46%	2,571	46.35%	121	2.19%	283	5.11%	5,546
Routt	6,771	58.35%	4,522	38.96%	311	2.69%	2,249	19.39%	11,604
Saguache	1,817	65.19%	889	31.89%	81	2.92%	928	33.30%	2,787
San Juan	320	65.57%	150	30.73%	18	3.70%	170	34.84%	488
San Miguel	2,858	71.97%	1,002	25.23%	111	2.80%	1,856	46.74%	3,971
Sedgwick	512	38.12%	800	59.56%	31	2.32%	-288	-21.44%	1,343
Summit	8,205	60.48%	5,022	37.02%	338	2.50%	3,183	23.46%	13,565
Teller	3,740	31.89%	7,617	64.96%	368	3.15%	-3,977	-33.07%	11,725
Washington	742	29.45%	1,717	68.16%	60	2.39%	-975	-38.71%	2,519
Weld	37,320	42.67%	47,986	54.87%	2,140	2.47%	-10,666	-12.20%	87,446
Yuma	1,488	33.06%	2,909	64.64%	103	2.30%	-1,421	-31.58%	4,500
Totals	1,081,188	51.30%	980,668	46.53%	45,616	2.17%	100,520	4.77%	2,170,472

==== Counties that flipped from Republican to Democratic ====
- Pueblo (largest city: Pueblo)
- Larimer (largest city: Fort Collins)
- Routt (Largest city: Steamboat Springs)
- Garfield (largest municipality: Glenwood Springs)
- Eagle (largest municipality: Edwards)
- Summit (largest municipality: Breckenridge)
- Jefferson (largest city: Lakewood)
- Clear Creek (largest city: Idaho Springs)
- Gilpin (largest city: Central City)
- Adams (largest city: Thornton)
- Arapahoe (largest city: Aurora)
- Gunnison (Largest city: Gunnison)
- Lake (Largest city: Leadville)
- Pitkin (Largest city: Aspen)
- La Plata (largest municipality: Durango)
- San Juan (largest municipality: Silverton)
- Rio Grande (Largest city: Monte Vista)
- Archuleta (Largest city: Pagosa Springs)
- Mineral (Largest city: Creede)
- Conejos (largest municipality: Manassa)
- Huerfano (largest city: Walsenburg)
- Alamosa (largest municipality: Alamosa)
- Costilla (largest municipality: San Luis)
- Saguache (largest city: Center)
- Las Animas (largest city: Trinidad)
- Bent (Largest city: Las Animas)

== See also ==
- 2004 United States Senate elections

== Notes ==
Partisan clients
