= Mora River =

River in New Mexico, United States

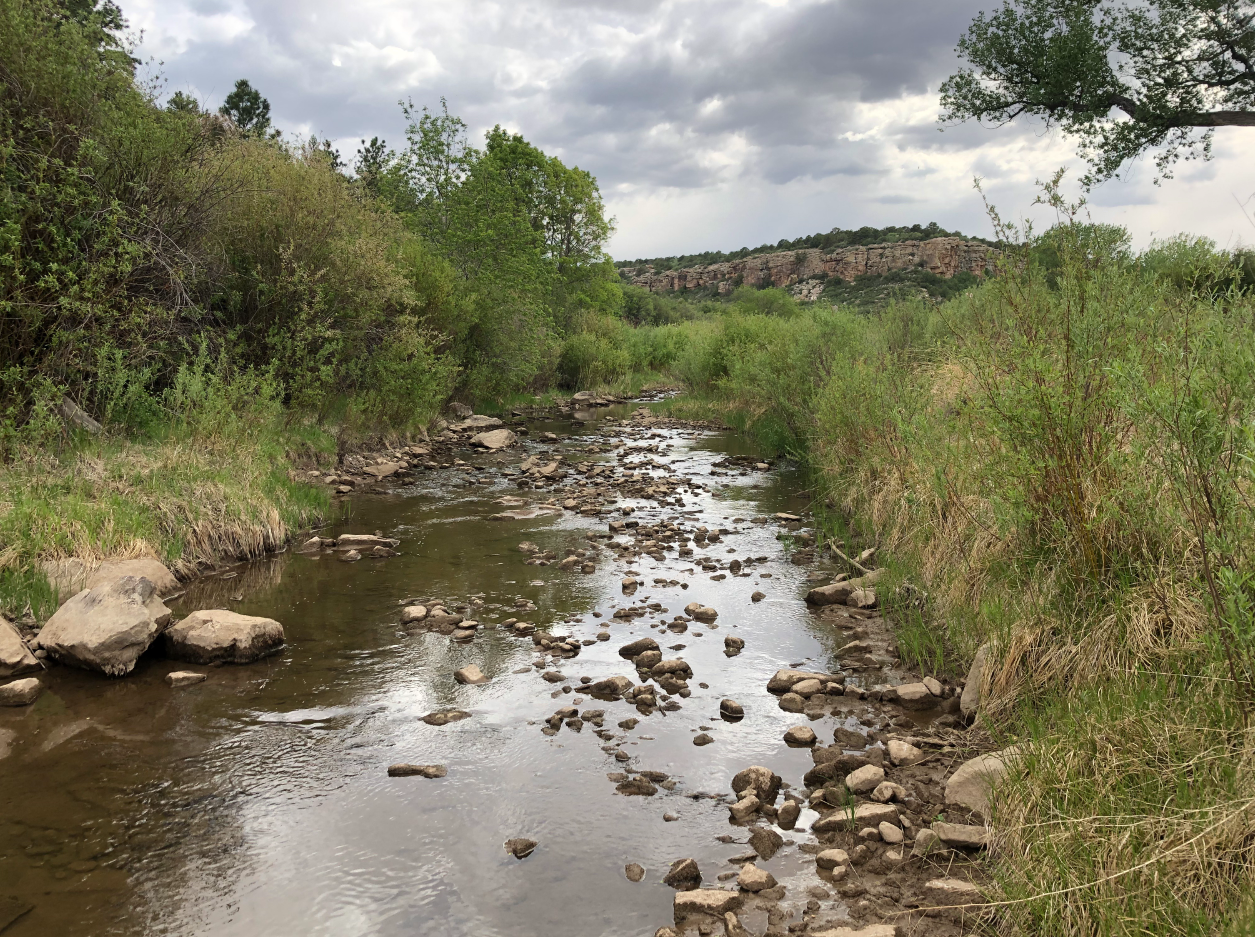
- A view of the Mora River looking upstream in the Rio Mora National Wildlife Refuge on November 15, 2021.

- Location within New Mexico Location within the United States

Physical characteristics
- Source
  - location: Osha Mountain
  - coordinates: 36°16′4.47″N 105°19′33.54″W
  - elevation: 3,128 m (10,262 ft)
- Mouth
  - location: Confluence with Canadian River
  - coordinates: 35°43′40.14″N 104°23′13.93″W
  - elevation: 1,409 m (4,623 ft)

Basin features
- Progression: Canadian River—Arkansas River—Mississippi River—Gulf of Mexico

The Mora River, also known as Rio Mora, is a stream in Mora and San Miguel counties in New Mexico, U.S. Its headwaters are on Osha Mountain of the Sangre de Cristo Mountains. The river flows downstream primarily through private land, but there are areas for fishing brown and rainbow trout below on public land in the town of Mora. It is a tributary of the Canadian River. It was called Rio Mora or Rio de lo de Mora on early maps.

The Mora River should not be confused with another stream also called the Rio Mora, which lies to the southwest of the Mora River in the Pecos Wilderness and is a tributary of the Pecos River.

== Course ==
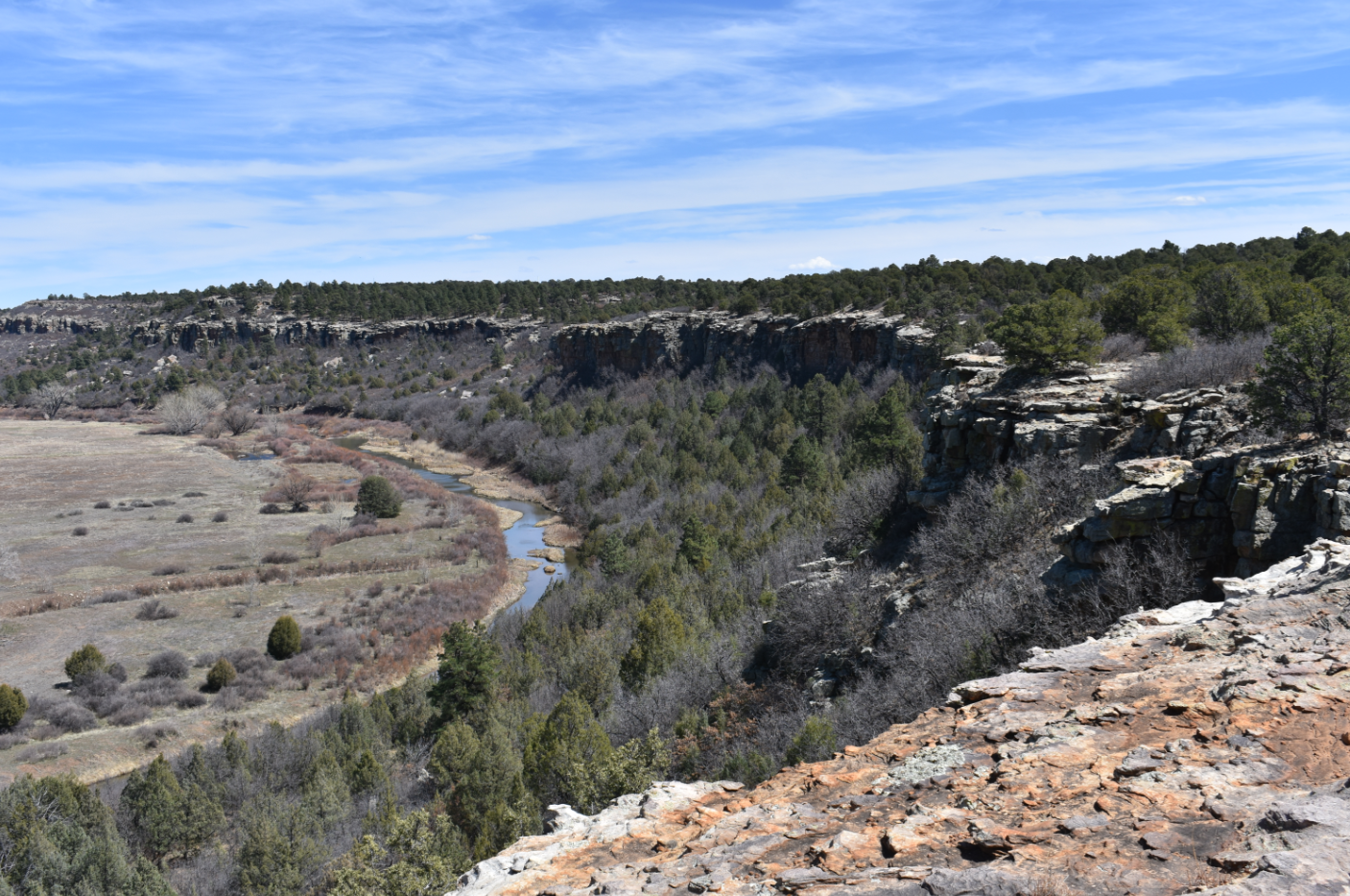
A view of the Mora River in the Rio Mora National Wildlife Refuge on November 15, 2021.

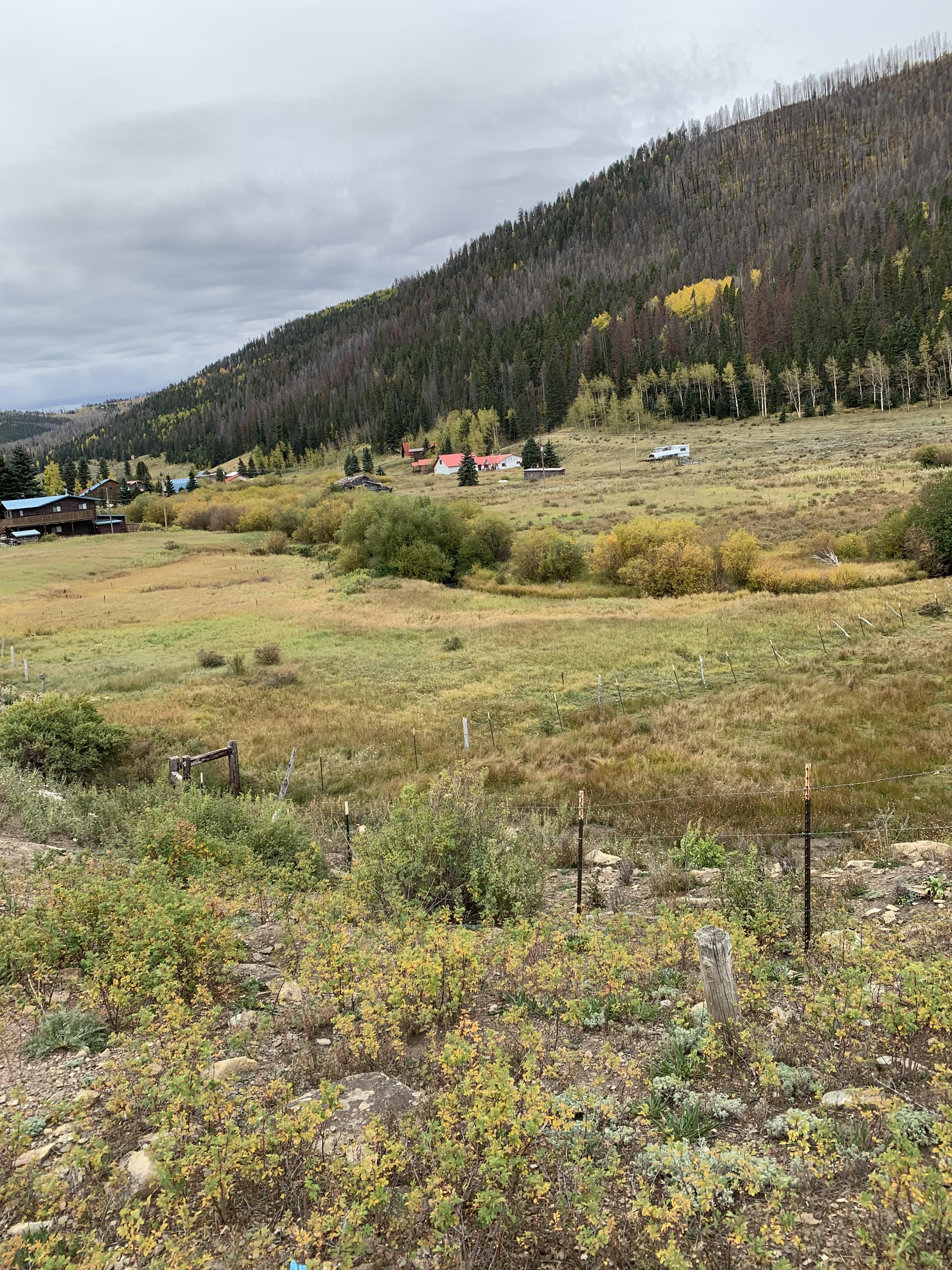
The Mora River valley near its source at an elevation of about 8,000 ft (2,400 m).

The headwaters are located in the Sangre de Cristo Mountains near Chacon. The stream flows south through Mora, east through La Cueva and Watrous to the confluence at Canadian River, north of Sabinoso. A five-mile (8 km) stretch of the river meanders through the Rio Mora National Wildlife Refuge, sometimes running between steep canyon walls up to 300 feet (91 m) in height.

== Tributaries ==
Coyote Creek, which runs through Coyote Creek State Park, is a tributary of Mora River.

== See also ==
- List of rivers of New Mexico
