= Ken Salazar =

American politician and diplomat (born 1955)

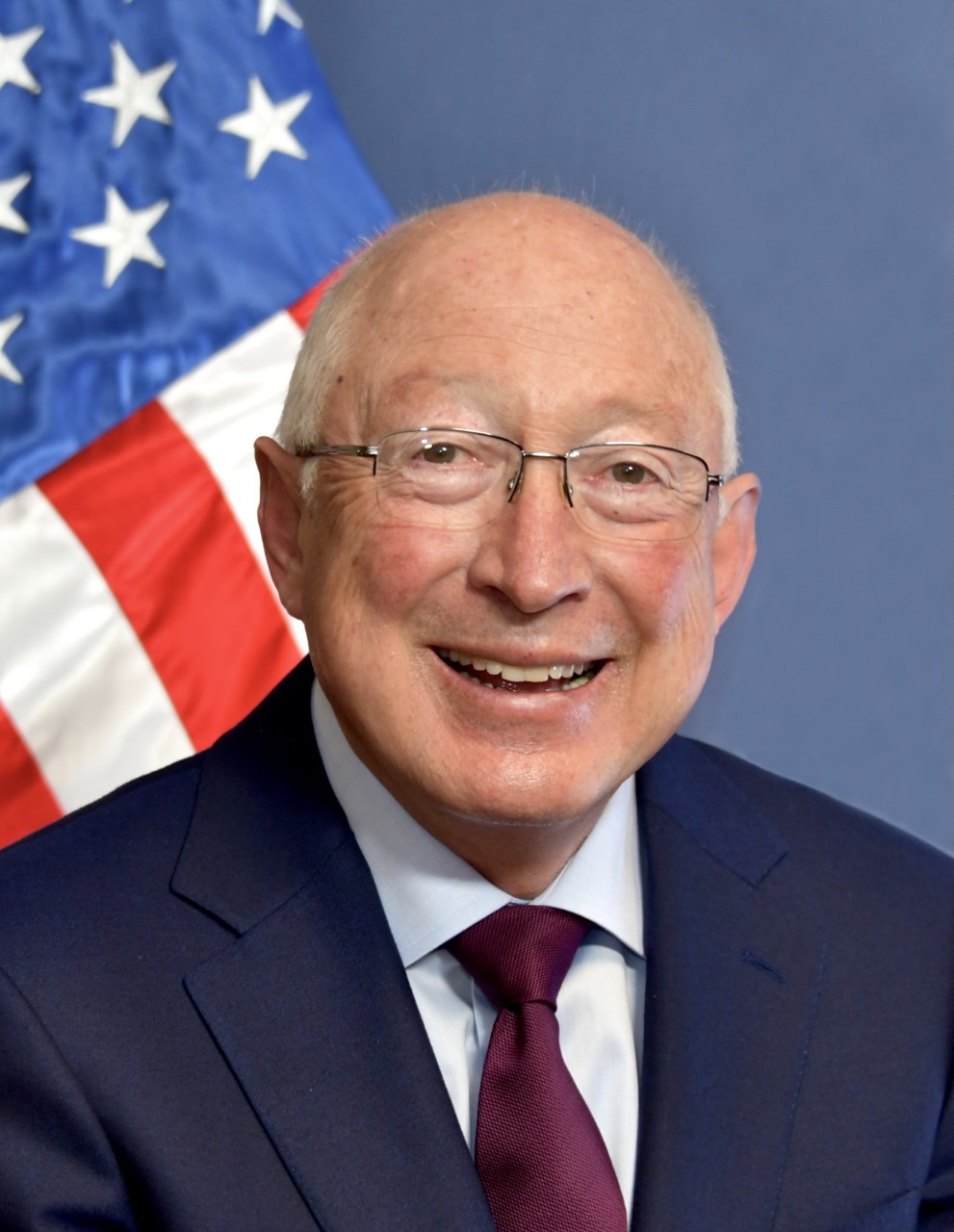
- Official portrait, 2022

United States Ambassador to Mexico
- In office September 14, 2021 – January 7, 2025
- President: Joe Biden
- Preceded by: Christopher Landau
- Succeeded by: Ronald D. Johnson

50th United States Secretary of the Interior
- In office January 20, 2009 – April 12, 2013
- President: Barack Obama
- Deputy: David J. Hayes
- Preceded by: Dirk Kempthorne
- Succeeded by: Sally Jewell

United States Senator from Colorado
- In office January 3, 2005 – January 20, 2009
- Preceded by: Ben Nighthorse Campbell
- Succeeded by: Michael Bennet

36th Attorney General of Colorado
- In office January 12, 1999 – January 3, 2005
- Governor: Bill Owens
- Preceded by: Gale Norton
- Succeeded by: John Suthers

Executive Director of the Colorado Department of Natural Resources
- In office 1990–1994
- Governor: Roy Romer
- Preceded by: Hamlet Barry
- Succeeded by: James Lochhead

Personal details
- Born: Kenneth Lee Salazar; March 2, 1955 (age 71) Alamosa, Colorado, U.S.
- Party: Democratic
- Spouse: Hope Hernandez
- Children: 2
- Relatives: John Salazar (brother)
- Education: Colorado College (BA); University of Michigan (JD)
- Salazar's voice Salazar answering questions from Bob Menendez at a Senate Energy Committee hearing. Recorded March 17, 2009

Kenneth Lee Salazar (born March 2, 1955) is an American lawyer, politician, and diplomat who served as United States ambassador to Mexico from 2021 to 2025. A member of the Democratic Party, he previously served as the 50th United States secretary of the interior in the administration of President Barack Obama from 2009 to 2013 and as a United States senator from Colorado from 2005 to 2009.

Salazar served as Attorney General of Colorado from 1999 to 2005. He became the first Latino senator representing Colorado in 2005. He and Mel Martínez (R-Florida) were the first Hispanic U.S. senators since 1977; they were joined by Bob Menendez (D-New Jersey) in 2006.

On December 17, 2008, President-elect Obama announced he would nominate Salazar as U.S. secretary of the interior. Reaction to his nomination from environmentalists was mixed. Previously, Salazar supported the nomination of Gale Norton to Secretary of the Interior, President George W. Bush's first appointee who preceded Salazar as Colorado attorney general. On January 20, 2009, Salazar was confirmed by unanimous consent in the Senate. On January 16, 2013, it was reported that Salazar planned to resign his post as Secretary of the Interior in March 2013, but his resignation was delayed pending Senate confirmation of his successor, Sally Jewell. On June 10, 2013, he became a partner in the major international law firm of WilmerHale, and was tasked with opening a Denver office for the firm. On August 16, 2016, Salazar was appointed to head presidential candidate Hillary Clinton's transition team.

In May 2021, President Joe Biden nominated Salazar as the United States ambassador to Mexico. His nomination was confirmed by a voice vote in the United States Senate on August 11, 2021.

== Early life and education ==
Ken Salazar was born in Alamosa, Colorado, the son of Emma Montoya and Enrique Salazar. His elder brother is former Congressman John Salazar. He grew up near Manassa, in the community of Los Rincones in the San Luis Valley area of south-central Colorado. Salazar attended St. Francis Seminary and Centauri High School in La Jara, graduating in 1973. He later attended Colorado College, earning a Bachelor of Arts degree in political science in 1977, and received his Juris Doctor from the University of Michigan Law School in 1981. Later Salazar was awarded honorary degrees (Doctor of Laws) from Colorado College (1993) and the University of Denver (1999). After graduating, Salazar started private law practice.

Salazar's Hispanic roots trace back to the Hispanos of New Mexico before New Mexico and Colorado were split up when they became part of Southwestern United States. He has identified as a Mexican American saying, "I've been taunted, called names—from 'dirty Mexican' to lots of other names—as I was growing up, and even now as a United States Senator."

== Career ==
=== Colorado cabinet ===
In 1986, Salazar became Chief Legal Counsel to then Colorado governor Roy Romer. In 1990, Romer appointed him to his Cabinet as director of the Colorado Department of Natural Resources.

In this position, he authored the Great Outdoors Colorado Amendment, which created a massive land conservation program of which he became chairman. Salazar also created the Youth in Natural Resources program, giving thousands of Colorado's youth an opportunity to work and learn about Colorado's natural resources in public schools. The Great Outdoors Colorado program's success was a model for President Obama's America's Great Outdoors Initiative to create a 21st-century agenda for conservation and outdoor recreation.

In his cabinet role, he established reforms that forced mining and petroleum operations to better protect the surrounding environment and helped plan and promote Denver's South Platte River Valley redevelopment, transforming the area from an abandoned wasteland to a vibrant economic center.

=== Colorado attorney general ===
In 1994, Salazar returned to private practice. In 1998, he was elected state attorney general; he was reelected to this position in 2002. Police operations were streamlined under Salazar, and several new branches of law enforcement were created: the Gang Prosecution Unit, the Environmental Crimes Unit, and the General Fugitive Prosecutive Unit, which targeted murderers. He also worked to strengthen consumer protection and anti-fraud laws, as well as to protect children through new policy designed to crack down on sex offenders.

As Colorado attorney general, he also led numerous investigations, including into the 1999 Columbine High School massacre. Salazar was awarded the Conference of Western Attorneys General Profile in Courage award for his work.

During Salazar's tenure, his office pursued several environmental cleanup cases around the state. In a water contamination case involving the Summitville mine in Rio Grande County, Colorado, Salazar helped broker a joint settlement in which the federal and state government shared the $5 million settlement proceeds.

=== U.S. Senate ===
In 2004, Salazar declared his candidacy for the United States Senate seat being vacated by retiring Republican senator Ben Nighthorse Campbell. Salazar considers himself a moderate and has at times taken positions that are in disagreement with the base of his party. He opposed gay adoption for a number of years, although by 2004 he had reversed his position. Salazar fell behind to candidate Mike Miles early in the state's caucus process. The national Democratic Party backed Salazar with contributions from the DSCC, and Salazar came back to defeat Miles in the Democratic primary, going on to defeat beer executive Pete Coors of the Coors Brewing Company and win the general election for the Senate seat. He assumed office on January 3, 2005.

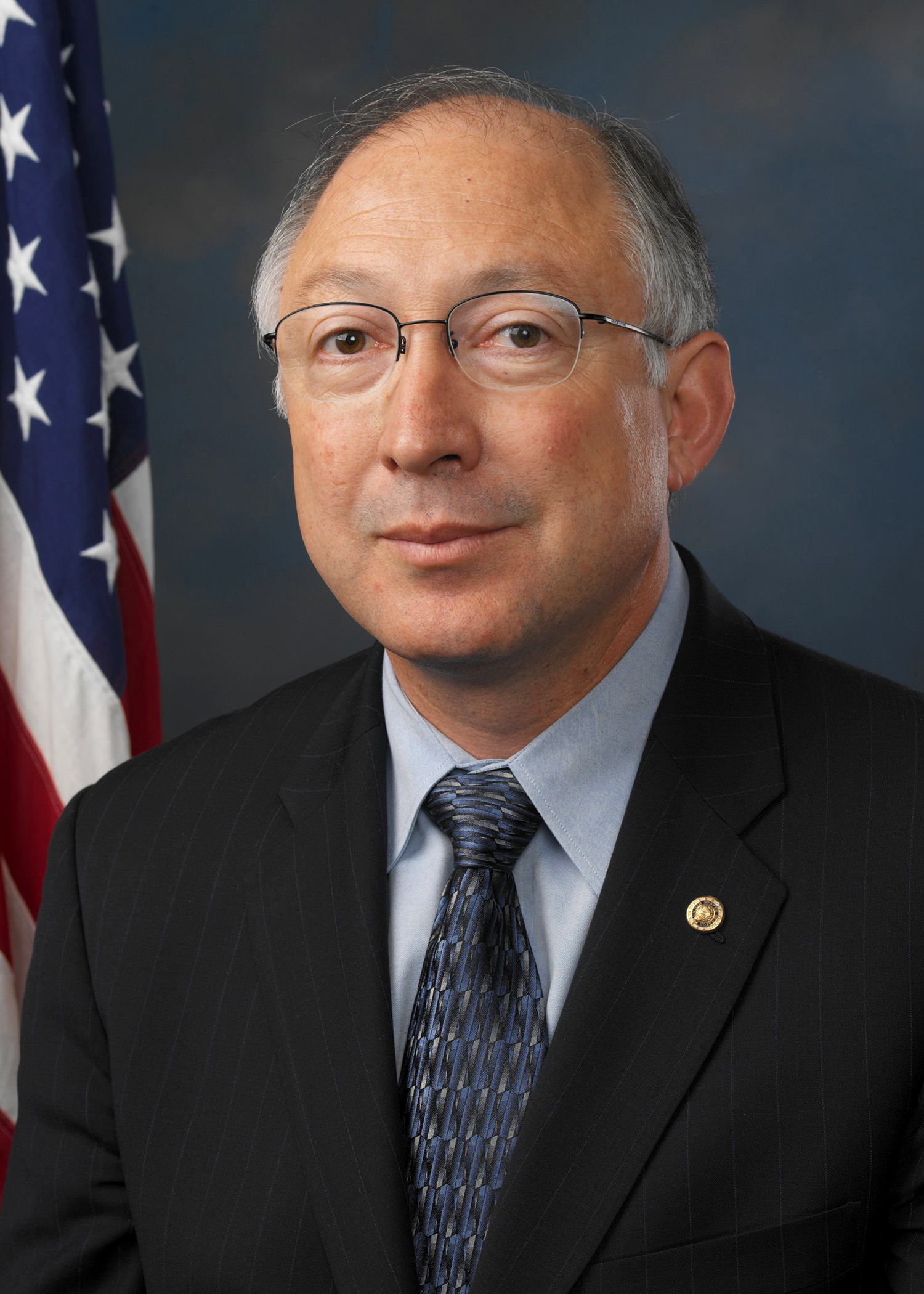
Salazar while serving as a U.S. Senator (109th Congress)

Salazar was a leading member of a bipartisan group of senators that developed the Comprehensive Immigration Reform Act of 2007, which would have provided a path to citizenship for undocumented immigrants and increased funding for border security, though the bill ultimately failed in the Senate. During negotiations, Salazar was quoted by The New York Times saying he wanted the new point system to be equitable: "We do not want to create a system that is just for the wealthiest and most educated immigrants."

On May 23, 2005, Salazar was among the Gang of 14 moderate senators to forge a compromise on the Democrats' use of the filibuster against judicial appointments, thus blocking the Republican leadership's attempt to implement the so-called "nuclear option". Under the agreement, the Democrats would retain the power to filibuster a Bush judicial nominee only in an "extraordinary circumstance", and the three most conservative Bush appellate court nominees (Janice Rogers Brown, Priscilla Owen and William Pryor) would receive a vote by the full Senate. Salazar has skirmished with Focus on the Family, a Colorado-based conservative Christian group of national stature, over his stance on judicial nominees.

In 2005, Salazar voted against increasing fuel-efficiency standards (CAFE) for cars and trucks, a vote that the League of Conservation Voters believes is anti-environment. In the same year, Salazar voted against an amendment to repeal tax breaks for ExxonMobil and other major petroleum companies.

In August 2006, Ken Salazar supported fellow Democratic senator Joe Lieberman in his primary race against Ned Lamont in Connecticut. Lamont, running primarily as an anti-war candidate, won the primary. Salazar's continued support of Lieberman, who successfully ran as an independent against Lamont, has rankled the anti-war wing of the Democratic Party.

In 2006, Salazar voted to end protections that limit offshore oil drilling in Florida's Gulf Coast.

Salazar introduced legislation, co-sponsored by Colorado representatives John Salazar and Mark Udall to limit natural gas drilling on the environmentally-rich Roan Plateau in western Colorado. The bill increased the amount of acreage on the Plateau designated too environmentally sensitive to drill for gas.

Salazar worked in the Senate to give benefits to Rocky Flats workers who became ill after working at the former nuclear weapons plant in Colorado. The legislation would grant workers immediate access to medical coverage and compensation without the need to file individual health claims.

In 2007, Salazar was one of only a handful of Democrats to vote against a bill that would require the United States Army Corps of Engineers to consider global warming when planning water projects.

Salazar received a 25 percent vote rating for 2007 by the Humane Society of the United States, a zero percent vote rating for 2005–2006 by Fund for Animals, a 60 percent vote rating for 2007 by Defenders of Wildlife, and a zero percent vote rating on the Animal Welfare Institute Compassion Index. He also supported the Bush administration's release of lands in the Conservation Reserve Program (CRP) for emergency haying in Colorado's Yuma and Phillips Counties. Salazar has an 81 percent lifetime rating from the League of Conservation Voters, including a 100 percent rating for the year 2008.

Salazar resigned his Senate seat on January 20, 2009, upon his confirmation by the Senate to become Secretary of the Interior under President Barack Obama.

=== U.S. secretary of the interior ===
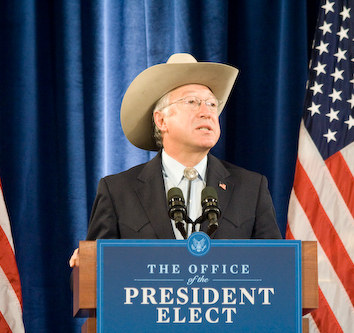
Salazar during a media conference of the Obama-Biden transition, on December 17, 2008.

Salazar accepted Obama's offer to join his cabinet as the secretary of the interior. His appointment triggered a Saxbe fix by Congress. On January 7, 2009, Congress approved a bill, S.J.Res. 3, and President George W. Bush signed it into law, providing such a fix by reducing the secretary of interior's salary to the level it was prior to the time Salazar took office in January 2009.

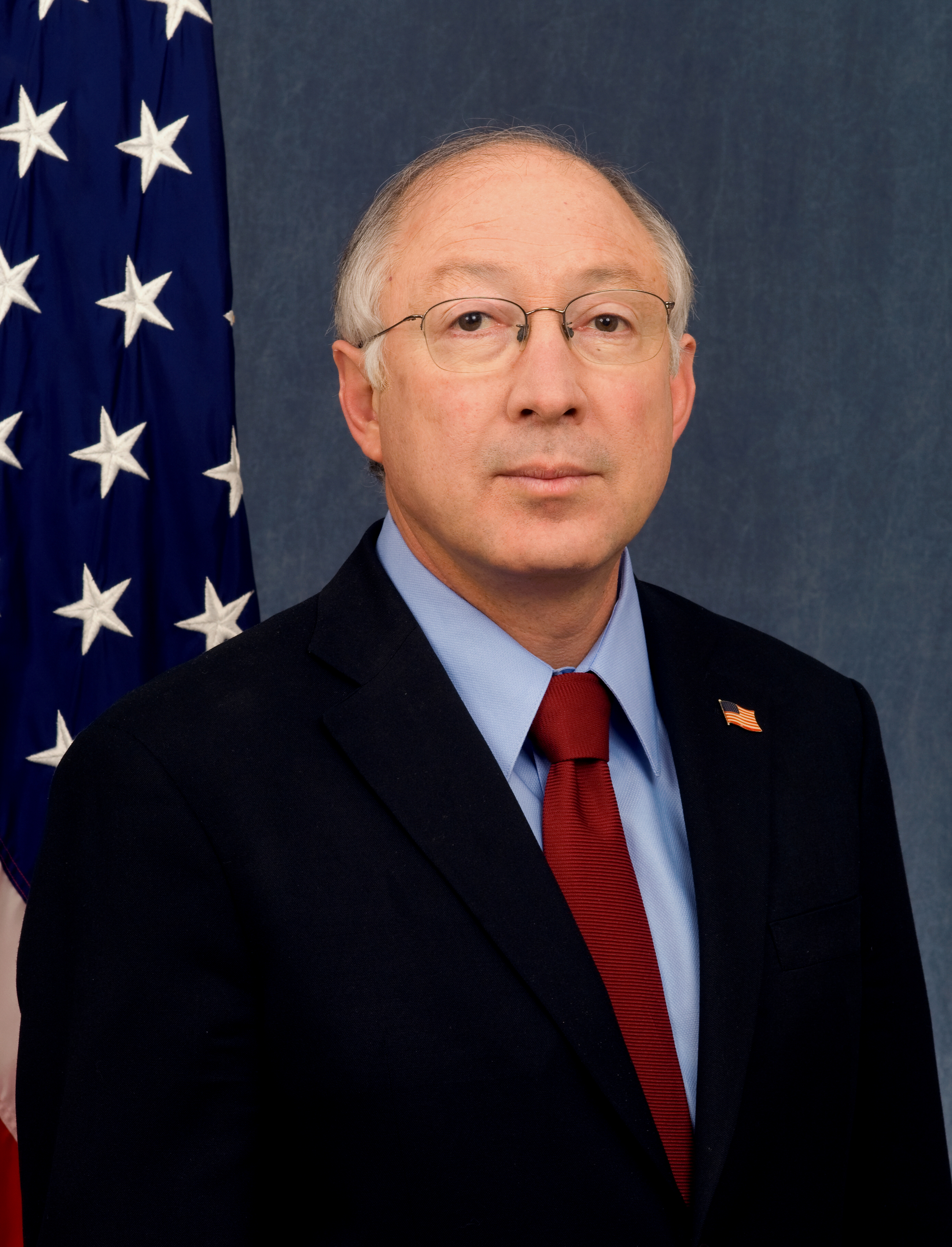
Salazar served as a secretary of the interior

The Senate confirmed Salazar's nomination by voice vote on January 20, 2009, shortly after Obama was sworn in as president. As Secretary of the Interior, Salazar was in charge of the National Park Service, the Bureau of Land Management, the United States Fish and Wildlife Service, the United States Geological Survey, the Bureau of Indian Affairs, and other federal agencies overseen by the Interior Department.

Salazar was one of two Hispanics serving in Obama's Cabinet, along with Secretary of Labor Hilda Solis of California. Salazar is the second Hispanic interior secretary after Manuel Lujan, Jr., who held the post from 1989 to 1993 under President George H. W. Bush.

As secretary of the department, Salazar began a large-scale effort within the department to ensure that the country's national parks and national monuments were inclusive of America's tribal and minority communities. Salazar worked to create new monuments to honor Cesar Chavez, the Buffalo Soldiers, Harriet Tubman and the Underground Railroad, Fort Monroe and sacred Native American sites like Chimney Rock in Colorado.

Several prominent environmentalist groups were wary of Salazar, noting his strong ties with the coal and mining industries. Kieran Suckling, executive director of Center for Biological Diversity, which tracks endangered species and habitat issues stated, "He [Ken Salazar] is a right-of-center Democrat who often favors industry and big agriculture in battles over global warming, fuel efficiency and endangered species."

The nomination was praised, however, by Gene Karpinski, President of the League of Conservation Voters. Upon the nomination, Karpinski said, "Throughout his career, Senator Salazar has campaigned on a pledge of support for 'our land, our water, our people.' With a perfect 100% score on the 2008 LCV Scorecard, he has lived up to that pledge. As a westerner, Senator Salazar has hands on experience with land and water issues, and will restore the Department of the Interior's role as the steward of America's public resources. We look forward to working with him to protect the health of America's land, water, and people in the coming years."

Although Senate Republicans were expected to raise questions concerning Salazar's stances on oil shale development and drilling in environmentally sensitive areas, Salazar was one of several Obama Cabinet appointees confirmed in the Senate by voice vote on January 20, 2009, shortly after Obama's inauguration. Salazar became the 50th Secretary of the Interior succeeding Dirk Kempthorne, who praised Salazar's appointment.

Colorado Governor Bill Ritter appointed Denver superintendent of schools Michael Bennet to finish Salazar's term in the Senate, which expired in January 2011.

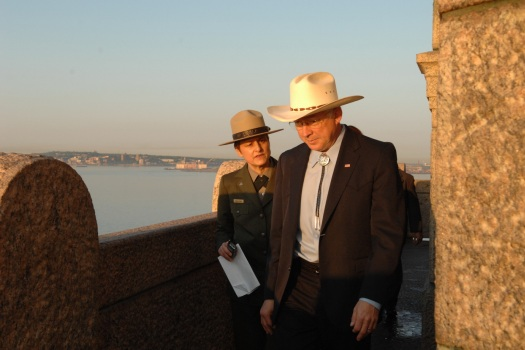
Maria Burks, commissioner of the National Parks of New York Harbor, and Ken Salazar at the Statue of Liberty in May 2009.

On January 23, 2009, Salazar stated that he was considering reopening the Statue of Liberty's crown to tourists. The crown has been closed to the public since the September 11, 2001, attacks. "I hope we can find a way", Salazar said in a statement. "It would proclaim to the world—both figuratively and literally—that the path to the light of liberty is open to all."

On March 6, 2009, Salazar agreed to move forward with the Fish and Wildlife Service's decision to remove the Rocky Mountain gray wolf from the Endangered Species List in Montana and Idaho, but not Wyoming. Minimum recovery goal for wolves in the northern Rocky Mountains is at least 30 breeding pairs and at least 300 wolves for at least three consecutive years, a goal that was attained in 2002 and has been exceeded every year since. (There are currently about 95 breeding pairs and 1,600 wolves in Montana, Idaho, and Wyoming.) Salazar, a former rancher has come under criticism of groups like the Defenders of Wildlife for this decision, and lack of protection of wolves.

On May 9, 2009, Salazar announced the upholding of a Bush-era policy that prevents the regulation of greenhouse gas emissions via the Endangered Species Act (ESA), a policy he pledged to reevaluate when he took office in January. The policy states that, despite the apparent negative impact global warming has on polar bears, an endangered species, greenhouse gasses cannot be regulated with the ESA. Salazar stated in a conference call announcing the decision that "The single greatest threat to the polar bear is the melting of Arctic Sea ice due to climate change," but the Endangered Species Act "is not the appropriate tool for us to deal with what is a global issue." The decision was met with criticism from environmental groups and praise from energy groups including the American Petroleum Institute, some Democrats and many Republicans. Salazar contended in the same conference call that the ESA was never intended to be used for the regulation of climate change, while sidestepping questions of how this situation is different from that of the Clean Air Act, which is being used by the Environmental Protection Agency to regulate emissions.

In May 2009, Colorado governor Bill Ritter, and the state's both senators, Michael Bennet and Mark Udall, wrote a letter to President Obama, recommending Salazar be appointed to the Supreme Court following the resignation of David Souter. Salazar stated on NBC News' Today Show that he was not interested and enjoyed his current job. United States Court of Appeals for the Second Circuit Judge Sonia Sotomayor was eventually nominated and confirmed.

With Ritter's announcement on January 6, 2010, that he would not seek re-election as governor, speculation began to swirl about a possible Salazar candidacy that year. Congressman John Salazar, Salazar's brother, told local media that he thought his brother would likely run for governor. Denver mayor John Hickenlooper indicated that while he was considering a run himself, he would "do everything [he could] to help him get elected." Both the secretary's brother, John, and the Obama administration urged him to run for governor, but he ultimately declined and endorsed Hickenlooper's campaign.

On April 28, 2010, Ken Salazar approved Cape Wind, the first-ever commercial wind operation in public water, leading to initiation of the approval process for the first-of-its-kind Atlantic wind energy transmission line.

During his time as secretary, Salazar successfully developed and implemented numerous renewable energy initiatives on public lands and helped lead the Obama administration's "all of the above" energy strategy.

Secretary Salazar prioritized the rapid, responsible development of renewable energy on America's public lands, greenlighting the development of over 11,000 megawatts of renewable energy on public lands, including approval of the first-ever solar energy projects on public lands, and creation of the first-ever roadmap for future solar energy development in the West.

During Salazar's tenure, the department also undertook new surveys to evaluate and identify innovative capacity and efficiency increases to help enhance hydropower generation at facilities of the Bureau of Reclamation, the nation's second-largest hydropower producer.

He has dealt with criticism after pushing to impose tougher leasing rules and cancel a series of planned drilling operations in Alaska and elsewhere. Salazar has dealt with criticism over his handling of the Deepwater Horizon oil spill, both because of the way his agency handled the permitting process for underwater drilling, and also because of the way the aftermath of the spill has been handled by the government.

But Salazar also ushered in the most comprehensive offshore oil and gas safety initiatives and reforms ever in the United States, overhauling the government's antiquated and conflicted offshore oil and gas management program while approving millions of acres for oil and gas development offshore. Salazar also implemented a new five-year plan for responsible oil and gas exploration and development in America's offshore waters.

In May 2010, Salazar testified to Congress that he had issued a "hit the pause button" order and that no new permits had been issued since the Deepwater Horizon explosion in the Gulf of Mexico. However, a new deepwater well had been started in the Gulf since April 20, and the Department of the Interior under Salazar had "issued permits for at least seventeen other new offshore oil projects."

As Secretary of the Interior, Salazar was the designated survivor for the 2011 State of the Union Address.

Salazar created new partnerships between the Department of the Interior and American mayors and governors to create and revitalize a new generation of urban parks in cities such as New York City, Denver, Chicago and St. Louis. As secretary, the department also created seven new national parks, including Pinnacles National Park in California, and 10 new national monuments.

In May 2012, Salazar spoke at the commencement ceremony for the 2012 class at the University of Massachusetts Lowell.

In November 2012, asked a question he did not like by a reporter for The Gazette regarding Salazar's association with hauler who shipped wild horses to slaughter plants, Salazar told the reporter, "If you do that to me again, I'll punch you out". Salazar later apologized.

In January 2013 Salazar announced that he would be resigning as Secretary of the Interior. His replacement, Sally Jewell, was nominated on February 6, 2013, approved by the Senate on April 10, 2013, and sworn in on April 12, 2013.

=== Private sector ===
On June 10, 2013, Salazar became a partner in the major international law firm of WilmerHale, and was tasked with opening a Denver office for the firm. He remained with the firm for eight years.

=== Clinton transition team ===
On August 16, 2016, Hillary for America chairman John Podesta announced that Secretary Clinton had chosen Salazar to head her transition team in order to prepare for an orderly transition should she be elected as the 45th President of the United States.

On November 8, 2016, Donald Trump defeated Hillary Clinton in the election for President of the United States, and thus Salazar was not granted the opportunity to head the White House transition team.

=== U.S. ambassador to Mexico ===
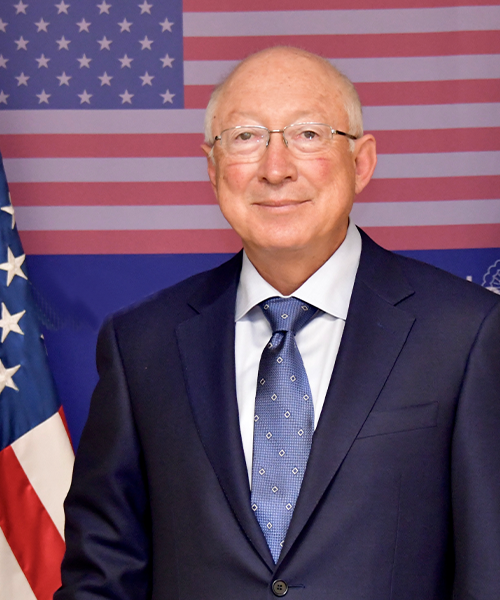
Salazar in 2021

On June 15, 2021, President Joe Biden nominated Salazar to be the next U.S. ambassador to Mexico. The Senate Foreign Relations Committee held hearings for his nomination on July 28, 2021. Salazar's nomination was then reported favorably by the committee on August 4, 2021. His nomination was confirmed by the United States Senate on August 11, 2021, by voice vote. He was ceremoniously sworn in by Vice President Kamala Harris on September 2, 2021. On September 14, 2021, Salazar presented his credentials to President Andrés Manuel López Obrador. In July 2022, the New York Times published an article quoting "growing concern within the Biden administration that the ambassador may have actually compromised U.S. interests" and had become too close to sitting Mexican president Andrés Manuel López Obrador.

=== Return to private sector ===
On May 21, 2025, it was announced that Salazar would rejoin WilmerHale as the law firm's senior counsel, based in their Denver office.

== Memoir ==
Salazar's memoir, Borderlands: My fight for an inclusive America, was published in 2026.

== Electoral history ==
2004 United States Senate election in Colorado
Primary election
Party	Candidate	Votes	%
Democratic	Ken Salazar	173,167	73.0
Democratic	Mike Miles	63,973	27.0
Total votes		237,140	100.0
General election
Democratic	Ken Salazar	1,081,178	51.3
Republican	Pete Coors	980,668	46.5
Constitution	Douglas Campbell	18,782	0.9
Libertarian	Richard Randall	10,160	0.5
Independent	John R. Harris	8,442	0.4
Reform	Victor Good	6,481	0.3
Independent	Finn Gotaas	1,750	0.1
Write-in		82	0.0
Total votes		2,107,543	100.0
Democratic gain from Republican			

2002 Colorado Attorney General election
Primary election
Party	Candidate	Votes	%
Democratic	Ken Salazar (incumbent)	108,849	100.0
Total votes		108,849	100.0
General election
Democratic	Ken Salazar (incumbent)	803,200	57.9
Republican	Marti Allbright	522,281	37.7
Green	Alison "Sunny" Mayna	35,301	2.5
Libertarian	Dwight K. Harding	26,023	1.9
Total votes		1,386,805	100.0
Democratic hold			

1998 Colorado Attorney General election
Primary election
Party	Candidate	Votes	%
Democratic	Ken Salazar	115,815	99.8
Write-in		224	0.2
Total votes		116,039	100.0
General election
Democratic	Ken Salazar	634,712	50.0
Republican	John Suthers	601,362	47.4
Libertarian	Wayne White	32,756	2.6
Write-in		282	0.0
Total votes		1,269,112	100.0
Democratic gain from Republican			

== See also ==
- Barack Obama Supreme Court candidates
- List of Hispanic and Latino Americans in the United States Congress

Legal offices
Preceded by Gale Norton	Attorney General of Colorado; 1999–2005	Succeeded by John Suthers
Party political offices
Preceded by Dottie Lamm	Democratic nominee for U.S. Senator from Colorado (Class 3); 2004	Succeeded by Michael Bennet
U.S. Senate
Preceded by Ben Campbell	U.S. Senator (Class 3) from Colorado; 2005–2009; Served alongside: Wayne Allard, Mark Udall	Succeeded by Michael Bennet
Political offices
Preceded by Dirk Kempthorne	United States Secretary of the Interior; 2009–2013	Succeeded by Sally Jewell
Diplomatic posts
Preceded by Christopher Landau	United States Ambassador to Mexico; 2021–2025	Succeeded by Ronald D. Johnson
U.S. order of precedence (ceremonial)
Preceded by Steve Preston as Former U.S. Cabinet Member	Order of precedence of the United States	Succeeded by Tom Vilsack as Former U.S. Cabinet Member
