= Maxwell National Wildlife Refuge =

National Wildlife Refuge in New Mexico

- IUCN category IV (habitat/species management area)
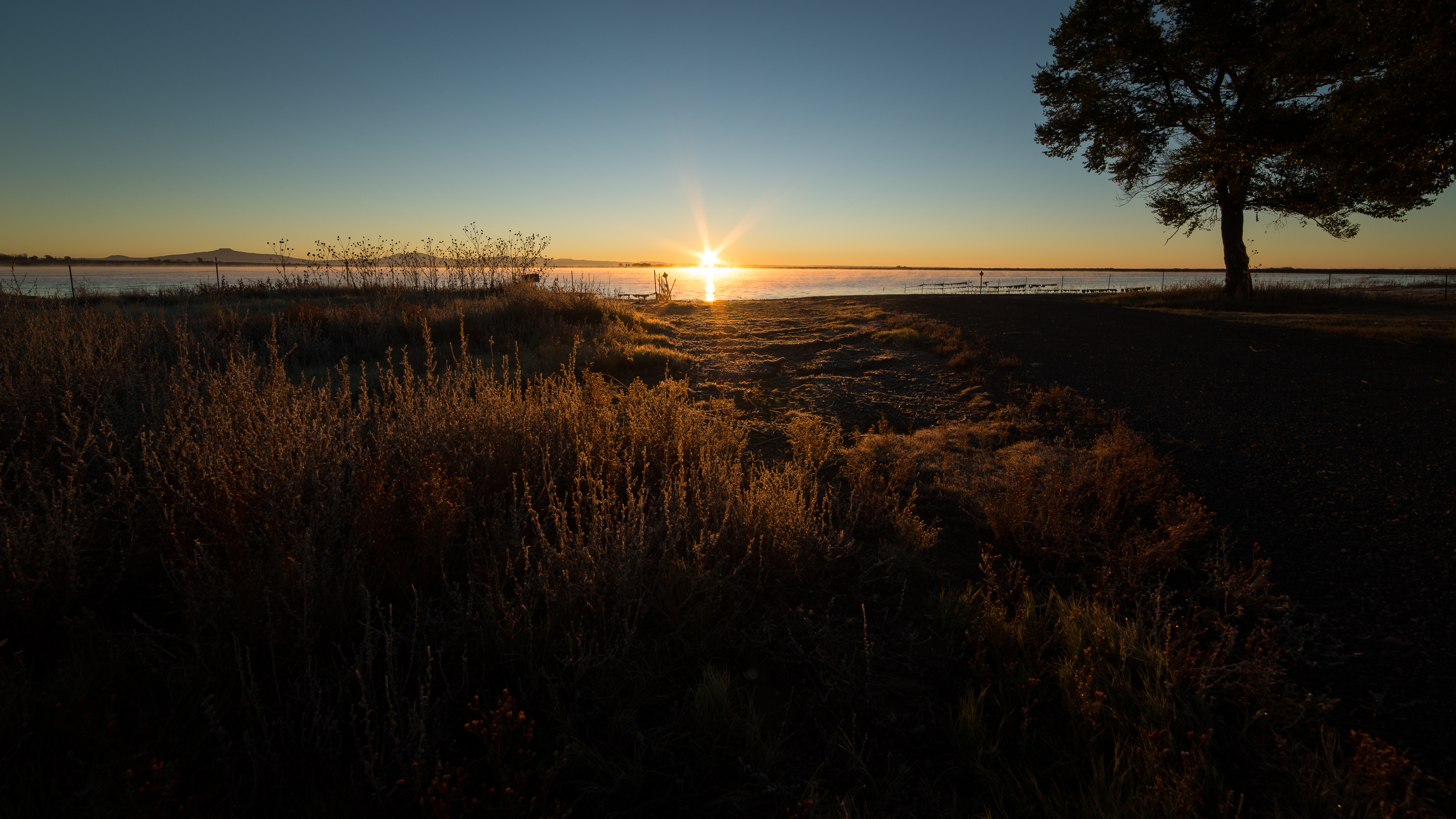
- Panorama of the refuge

- Location within the United States Location within New Mexico
- Location: Colfax County, New Mexico, USA
- Nearest city: Raton, NM
- Coordinates: 36°34′17″N 104°34′46″W
- Area: 3,699 acres (1,497 ha)
- Established: 1965
- Governing body: U.S. Fish & Wildlife Service
- Website: Maxwell National Wildlife Refuge

The Maxwell National Wildlife Refuge, located in the high central plains of northeastern New Mexico, was established in 1965 as a feeding and resting area for migratory birds. Over 350 acres (1.4 km^{2}) of the refuge are planted with wheat, corn, barley, and alfalfa to provide food for resident and migratory wildlife. Visitors may see bald and golden eagles, falcons, hawks, sandhill cranes, ducks, white pelicans, burrowing owls, great horned owls, black-tailed prairie dogs, raccoons, coyotes, skunks, cougars, muskrats, badgers, bobcats, mule deer, white-tailed deer, and the occasional elk.

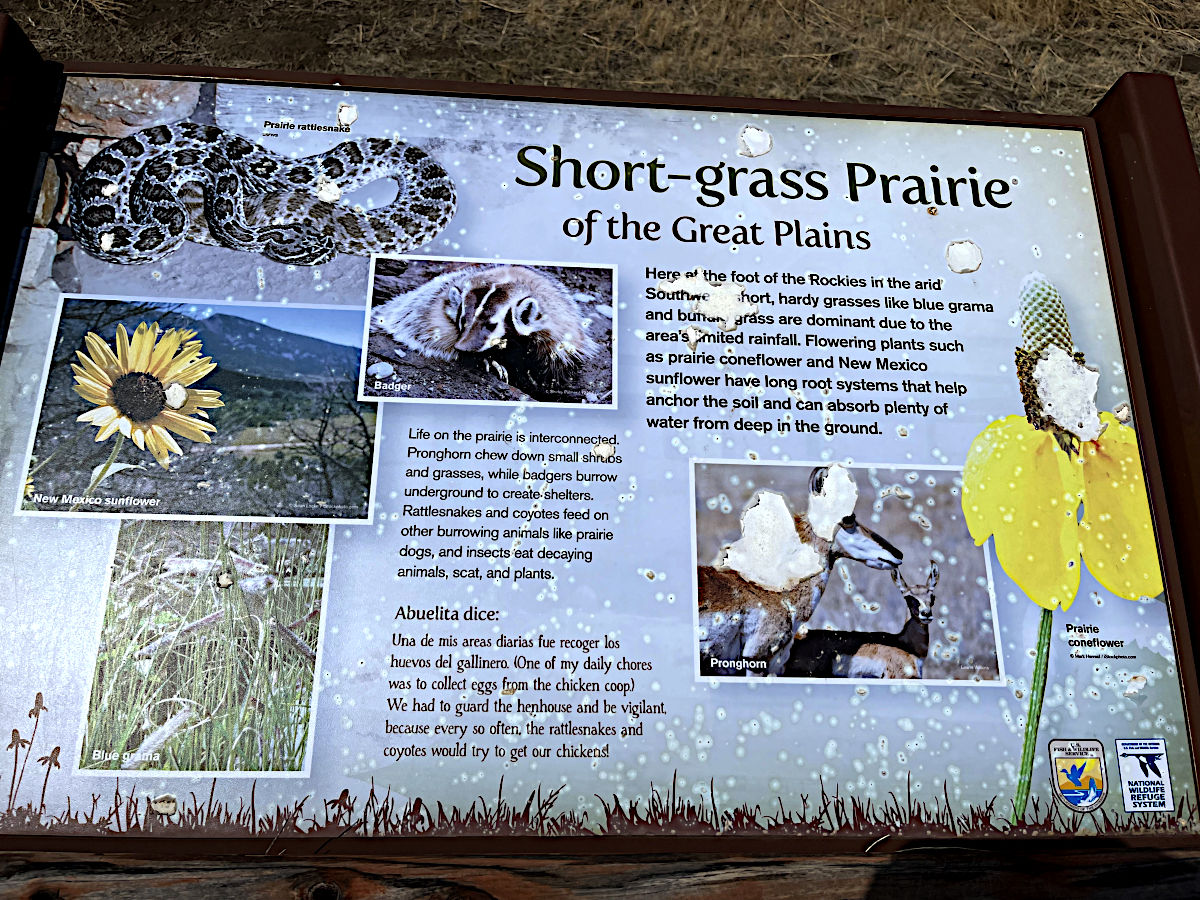
Interpretive sign

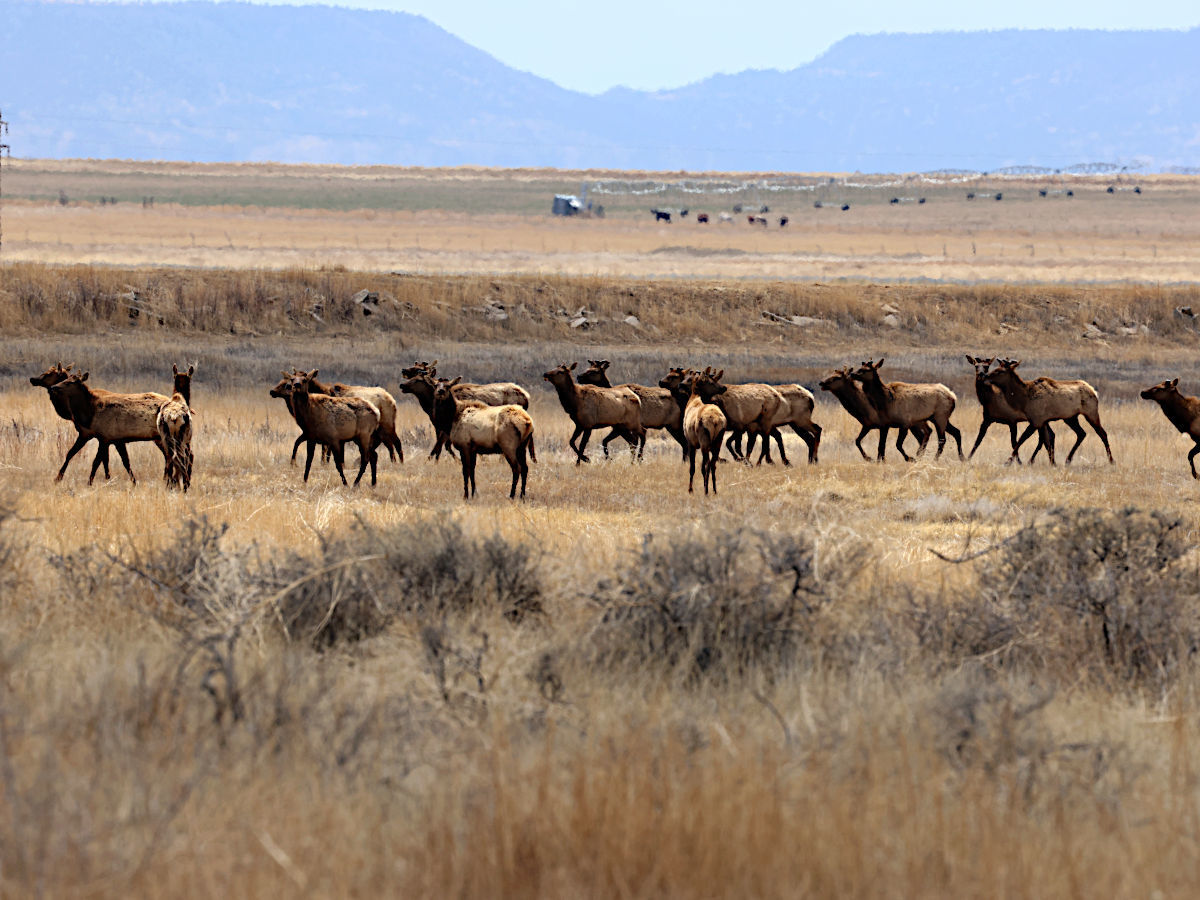
Elk herd
