= Persian musical instruments =

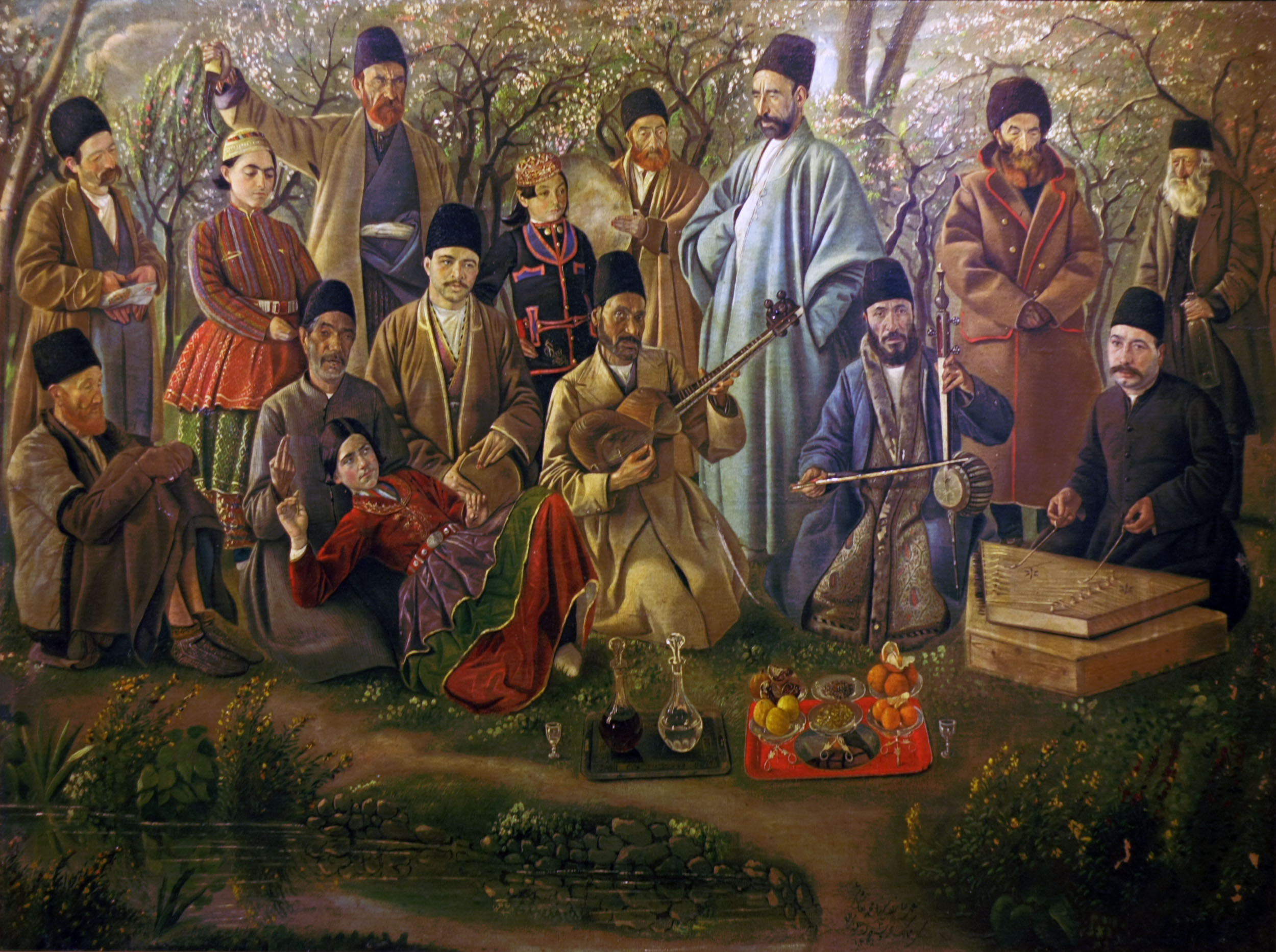
Portrait of a music group in the Naser al-Din Shah Qajar era, 1886

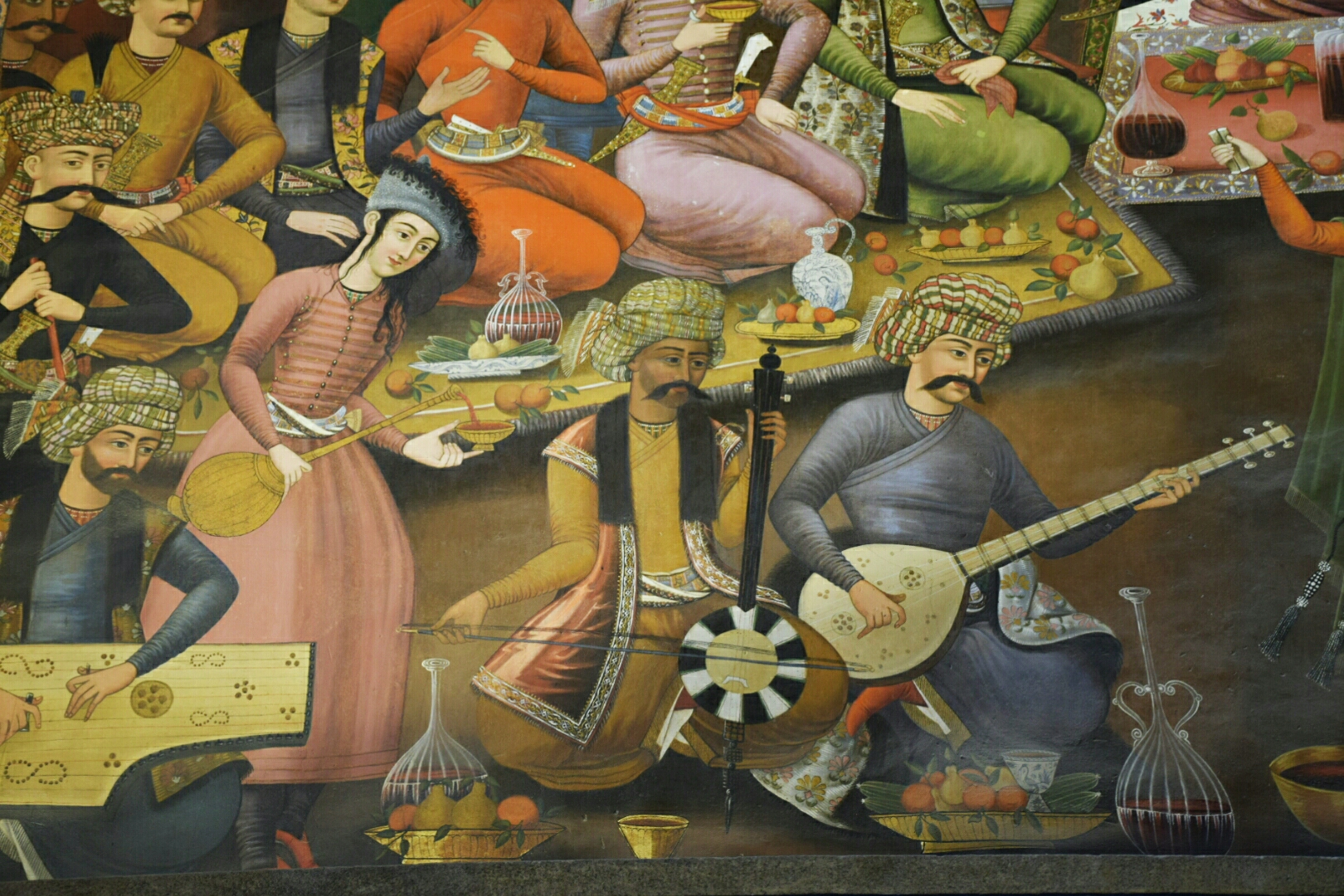
17th century fresco at Chehel Sotoun showing musicians at a 1658 entertainment, in which Shah Abbas II hosted Nadr Mohammed Khan.

Persian musical instruments or Iranian musical instruments can be broadly classified into three categories: classical, Western and folk. Most Persian musical instruments spread in regions under the control of former Persian Empires across West Asia and the Caucasus, Central Asia and through adaptation, relations, and trade, to Europe and the far regions of Asia. In the ancient era, the Silk Road had an effective role in this distribution.

== String instruments ==
Orchestral

- Tar
- Setar
- Kamancheh
- Ghaychak
- Barbat
- Chang (instrument)/Angular harp
- Santur
- Qānūn
- Shurangiz
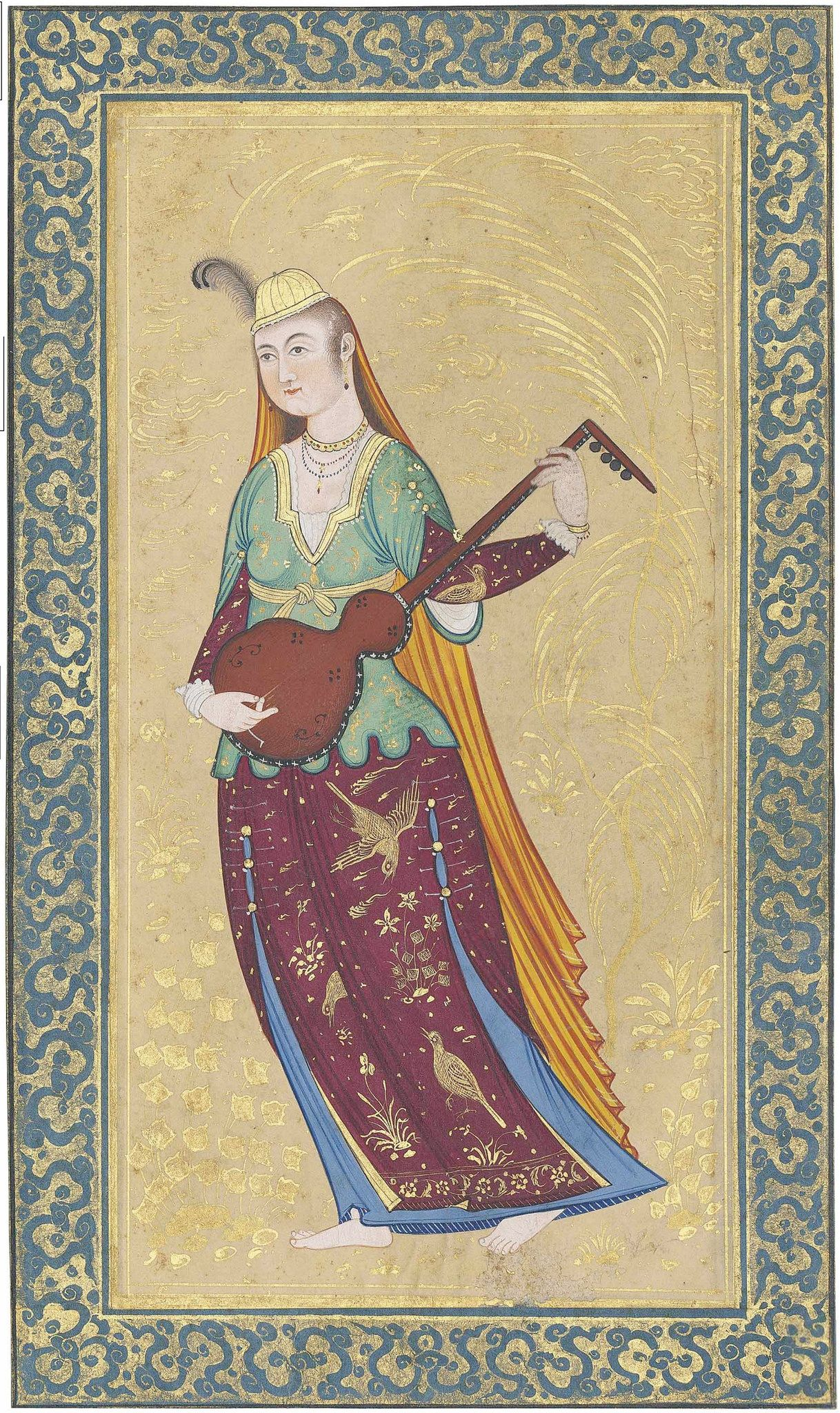
Tar

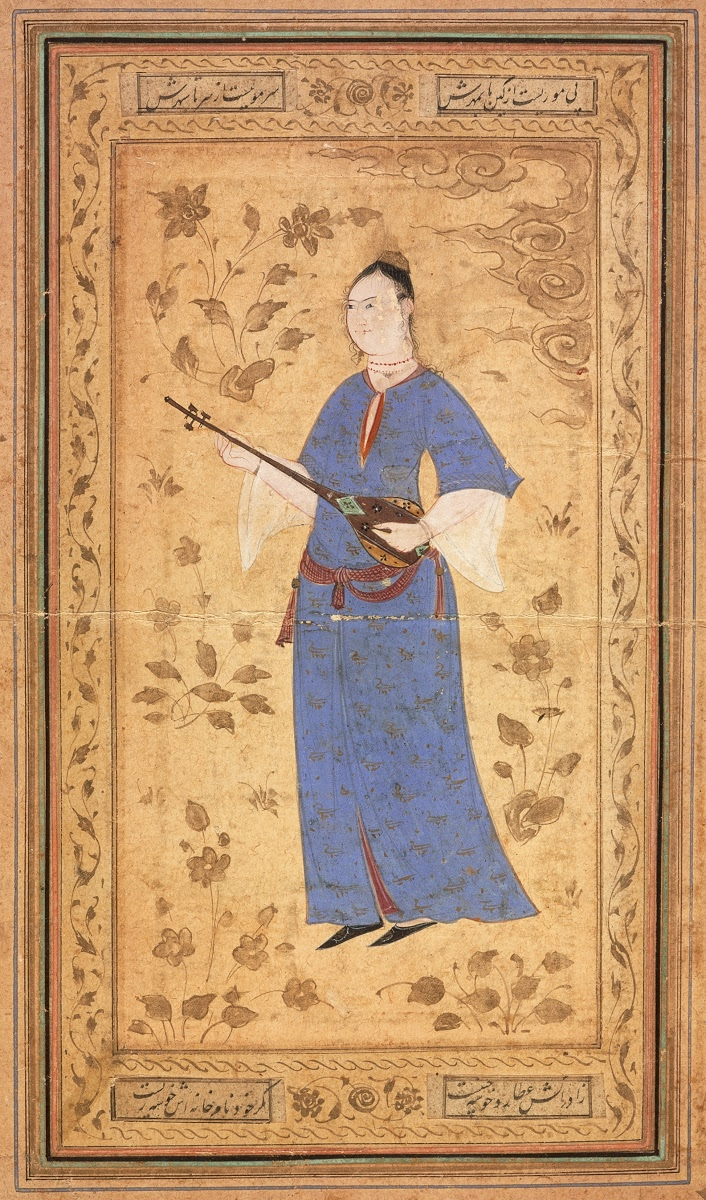
Setar, ca. 1610

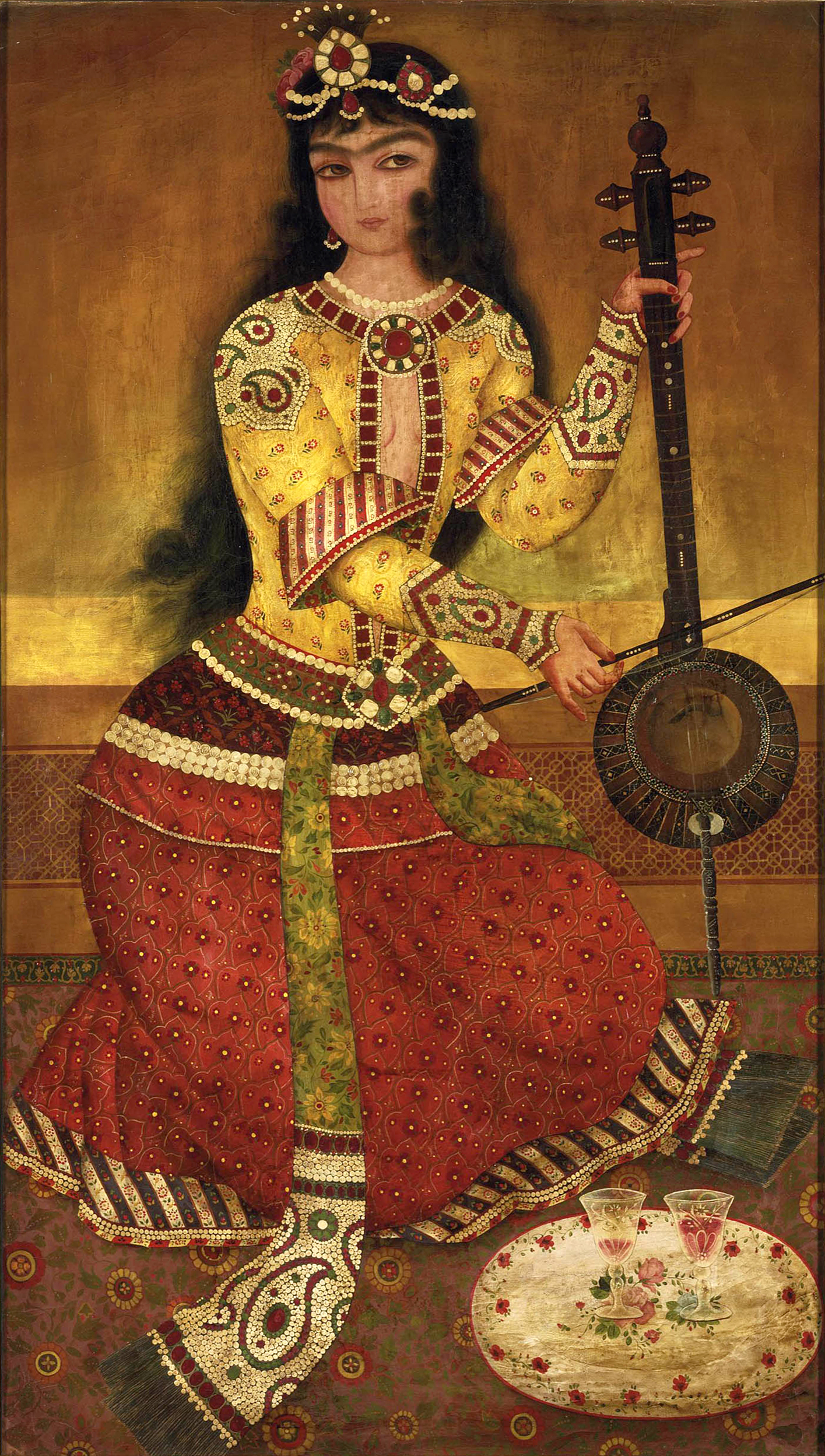
Kamancheh

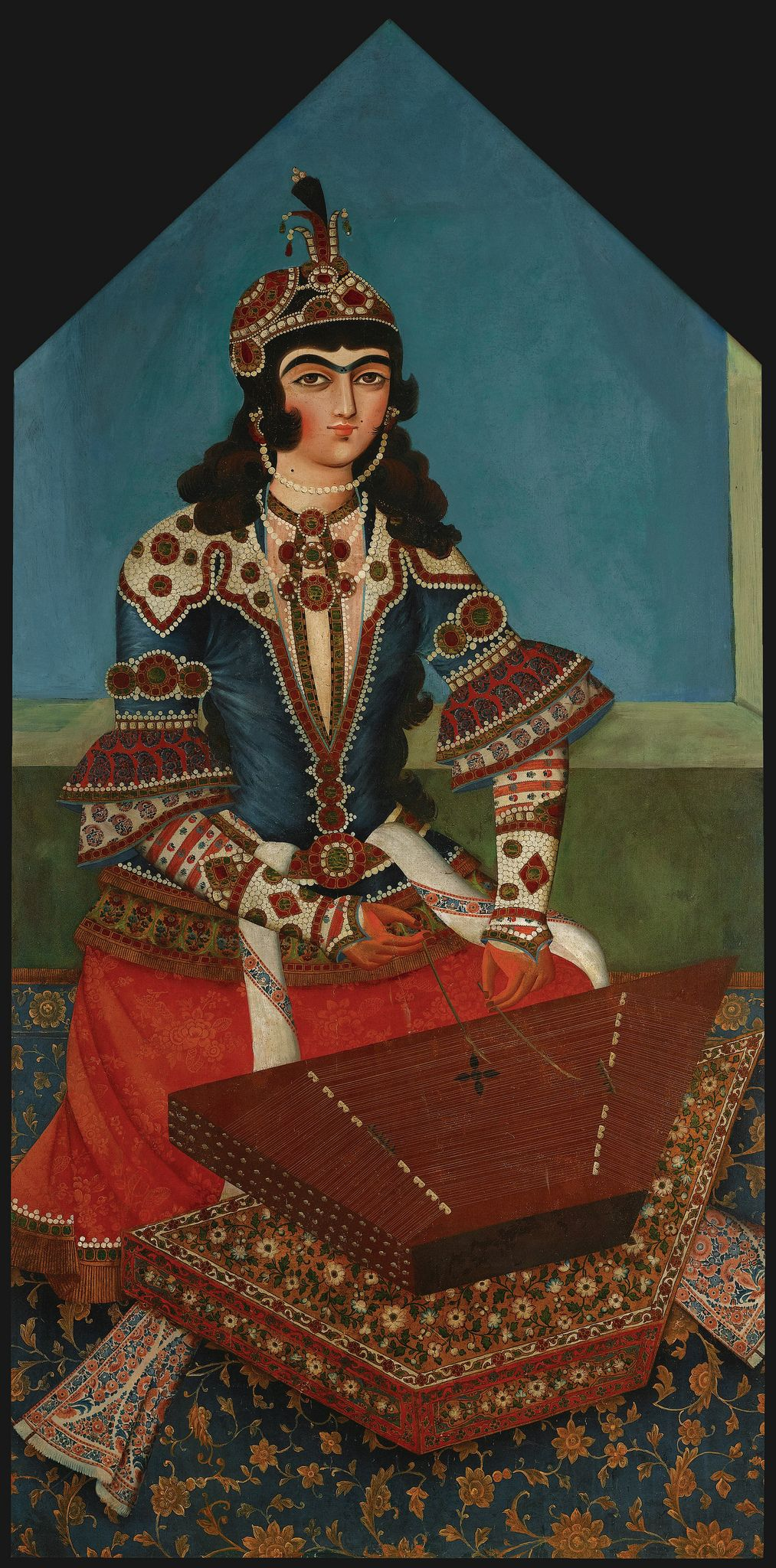
Woman playing a santur, 19th century

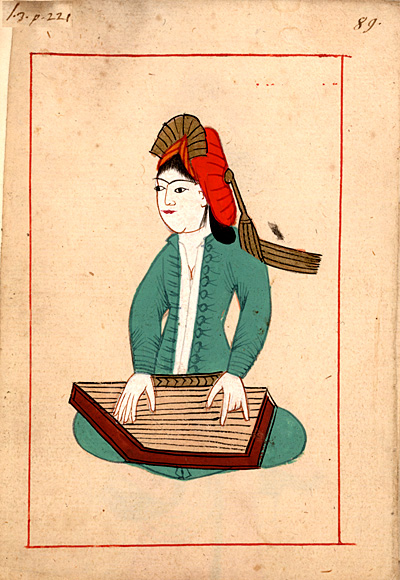
Qanun, from Rålamb Costume Book, 1657

Folklore

- Dutar
- Tanbur
- Tar (Azerbaijani instrument)
- Divan (diwan or divan sazı, type of Bağlama)
- Sallaneh
- Sorahi
- Suroz
- Rubab (instrument)
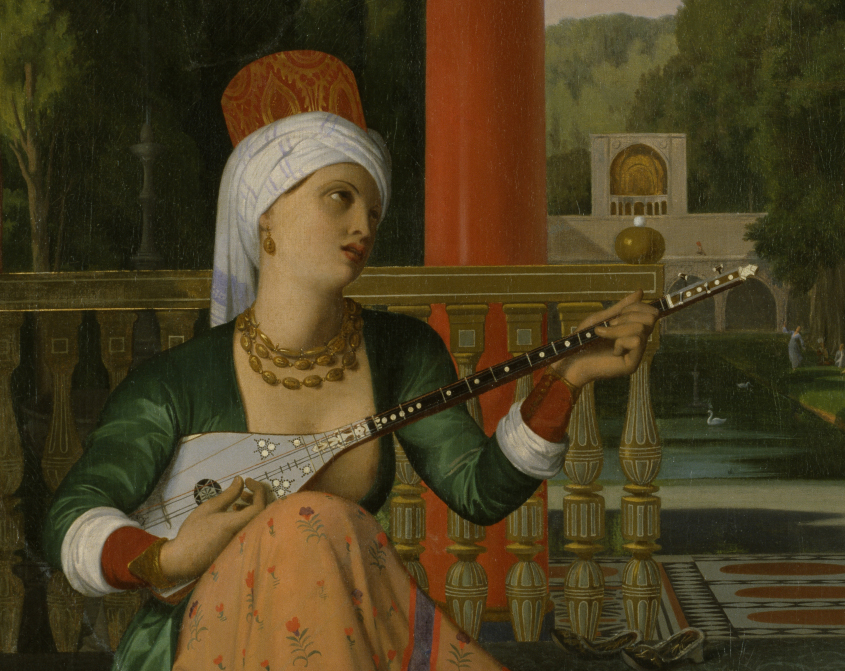
Dotar (2 courses of strings)

== Wind instruments ==
Orchestral

- Ney

Folklores

- Balaban (instrument)
- Donali
- Duduk
- Dozaleh
- Garmon
- Karna
- Ney-anbān
- Sorna

Historical

- Nafir
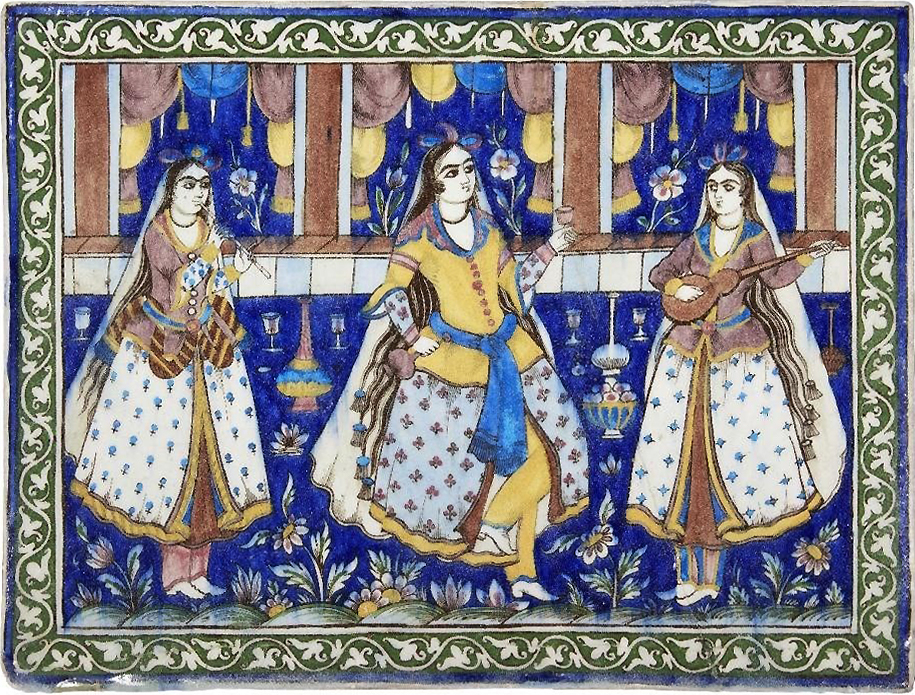
19th century C.E. Qajar Iran scene with women playing ney (flute), tar (lute) and dancing.

== Percussion instruments ==
While Arabic and Persian are separate languages, to a great extent the cultures intermixed during and after the Muslim conquest of Persia. Arabic became the lingua franca from North Africa to Central and South Asia, much as Latin was in Europe. As a result, the list below may contain Arabic words that don't belong, but may also include words shared by both languages. An example is daf (دف), for which the Arab word is also daf or duff (plural dofuf). Similarly, conquests and cultural intermixing have made Turkish words available, such as kudum.

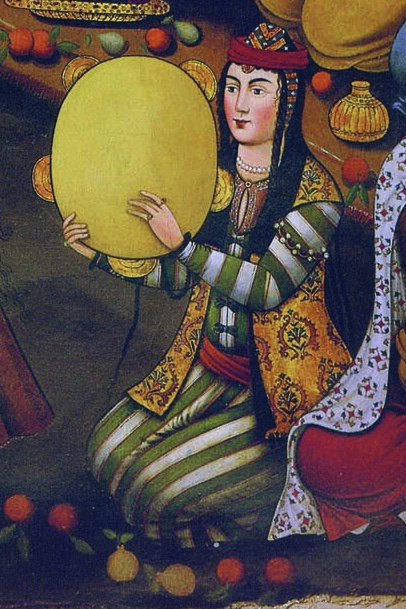
Persian woman playing the Daf, from a painting on the walls of Chehel Sotoun Palace, Isfahan, 17th century

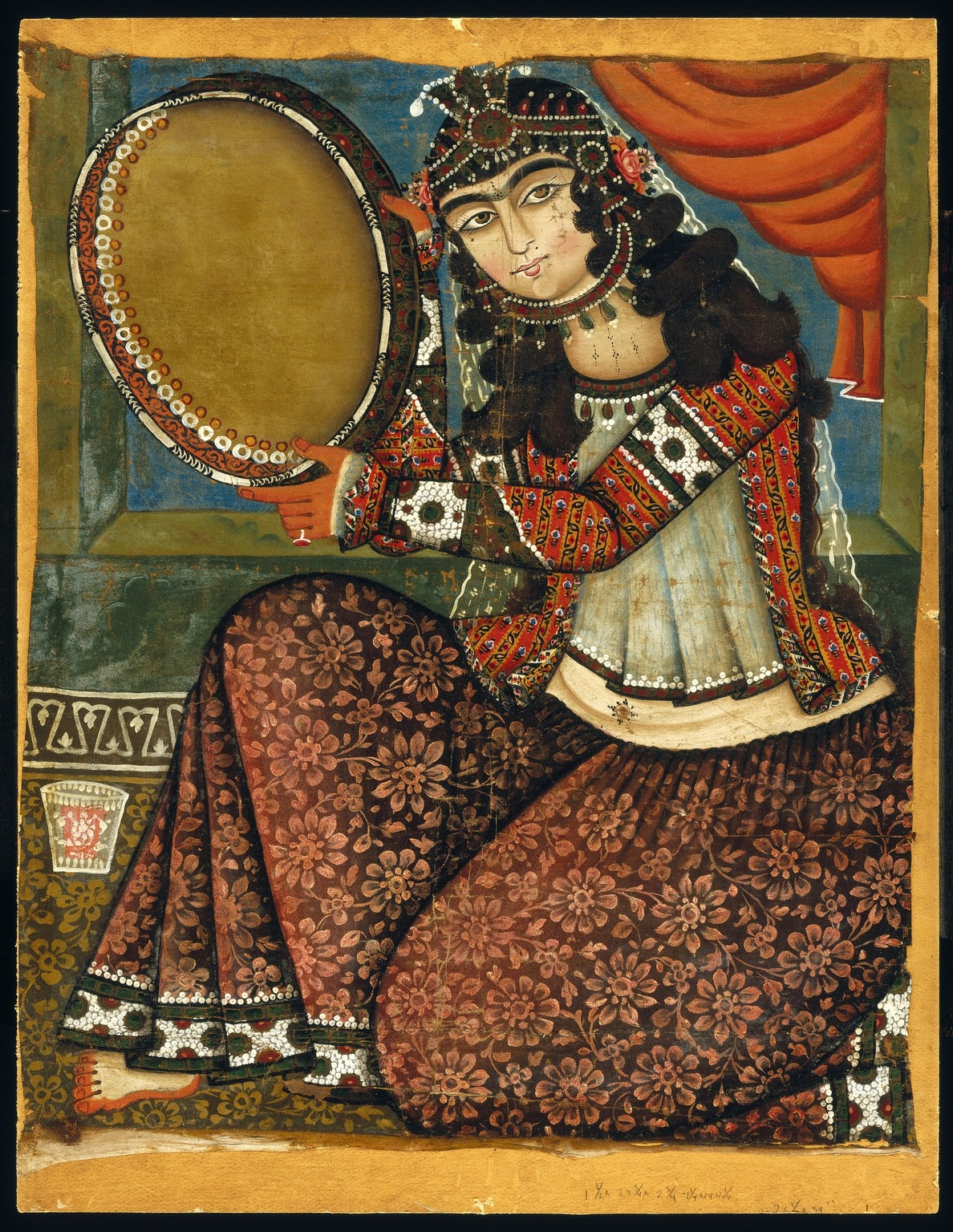
Persian miniature of Woman with frame drum in Qajar Iran, 19th century. Possibly a daf; the red and white circles are links of chain attached to the inner edge of the drum.

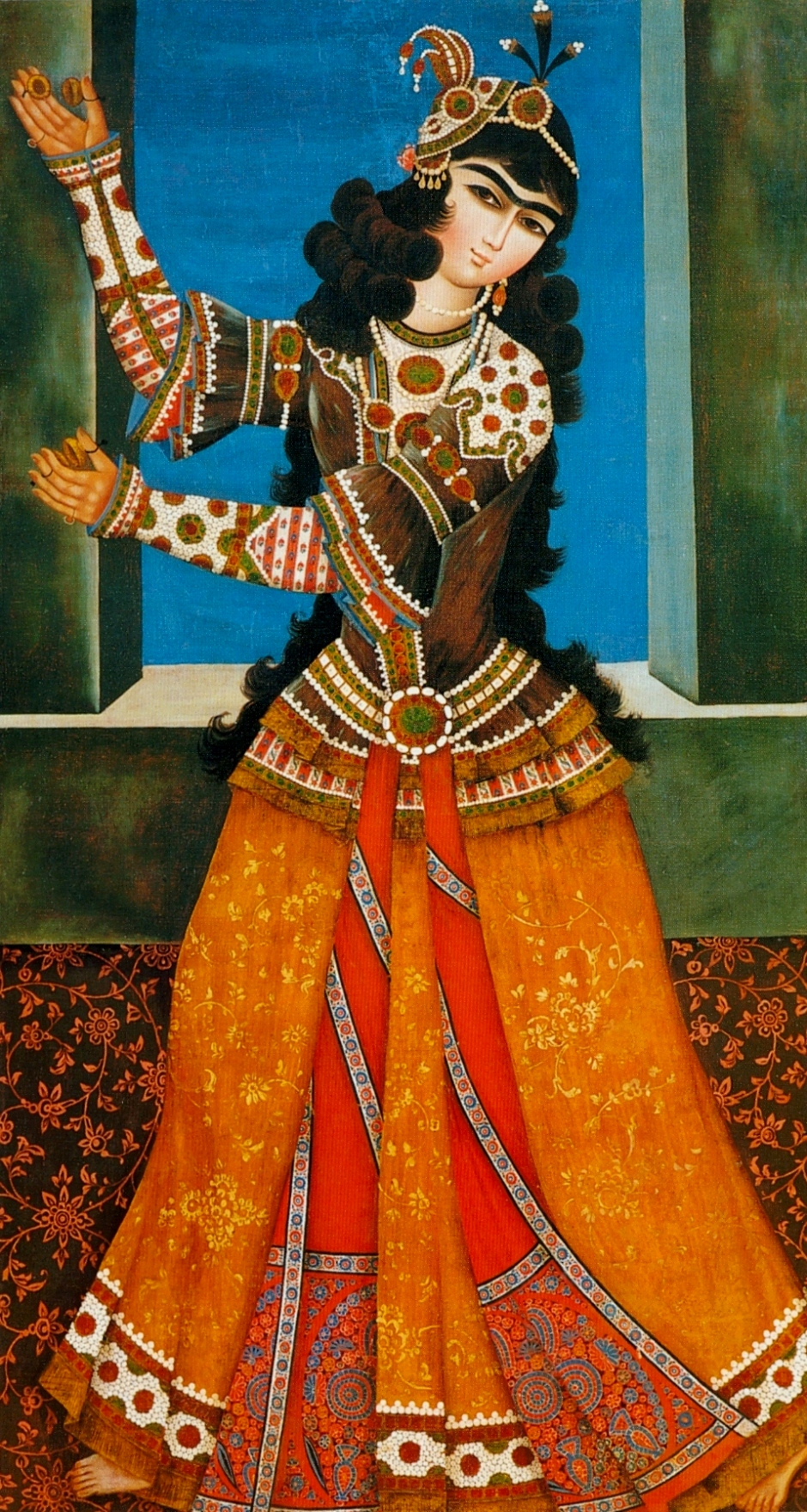
Woman playing Kastan (کاستانیـِت), or possibly ghashoghak or zills.

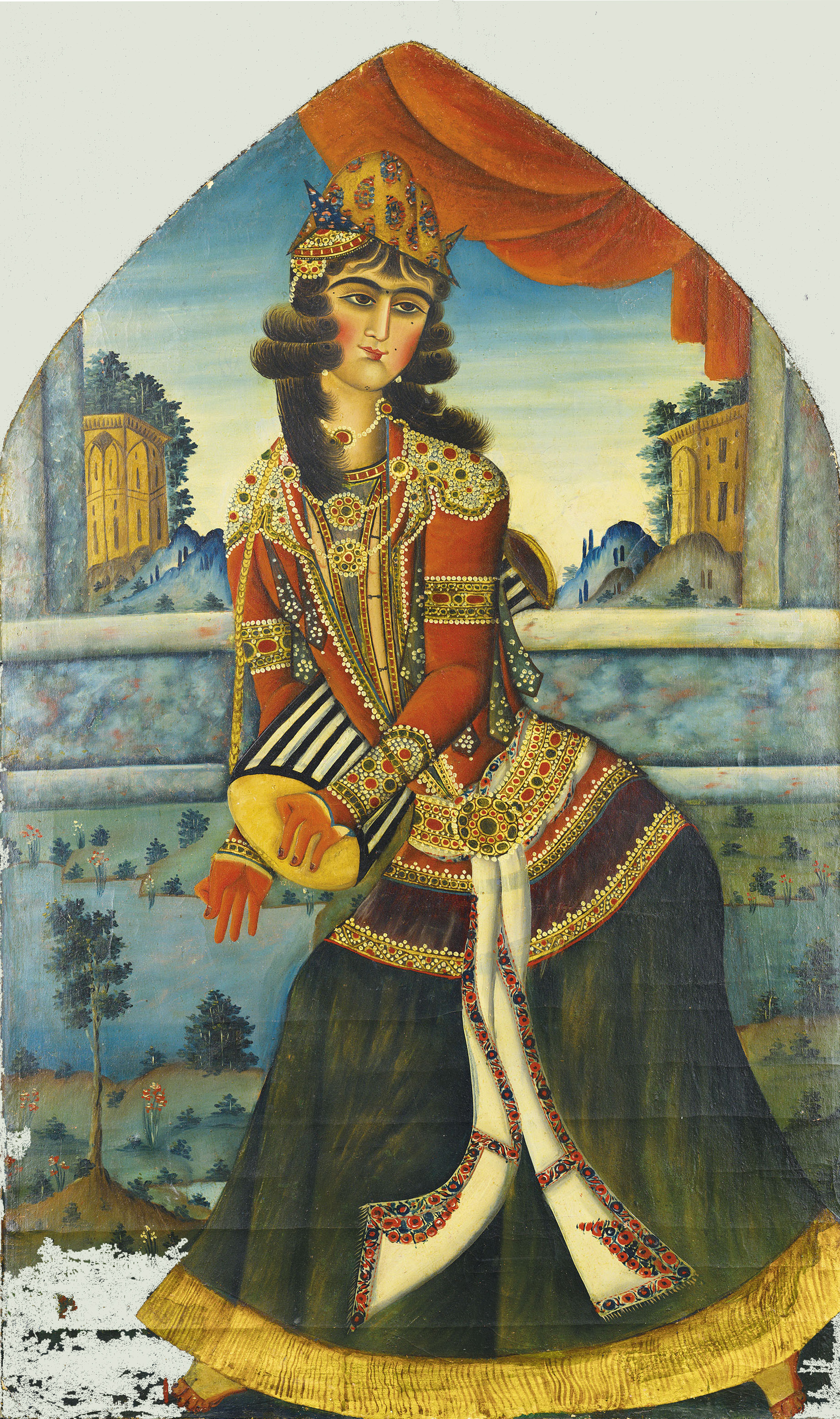
Woman with Zarb drum, Qajar Iran, 19th century

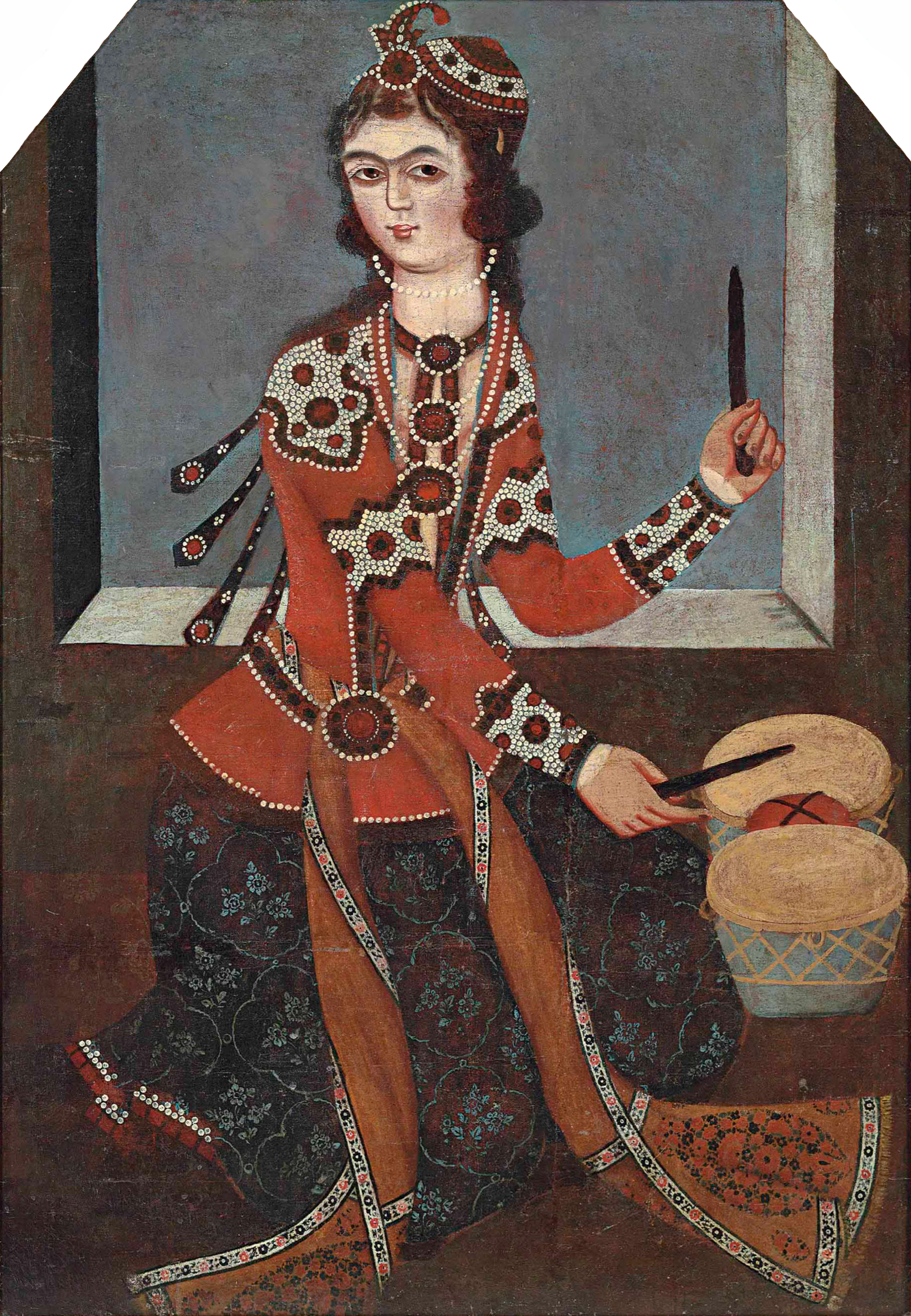
Woman playing drums, Qajar Iran, 19th century

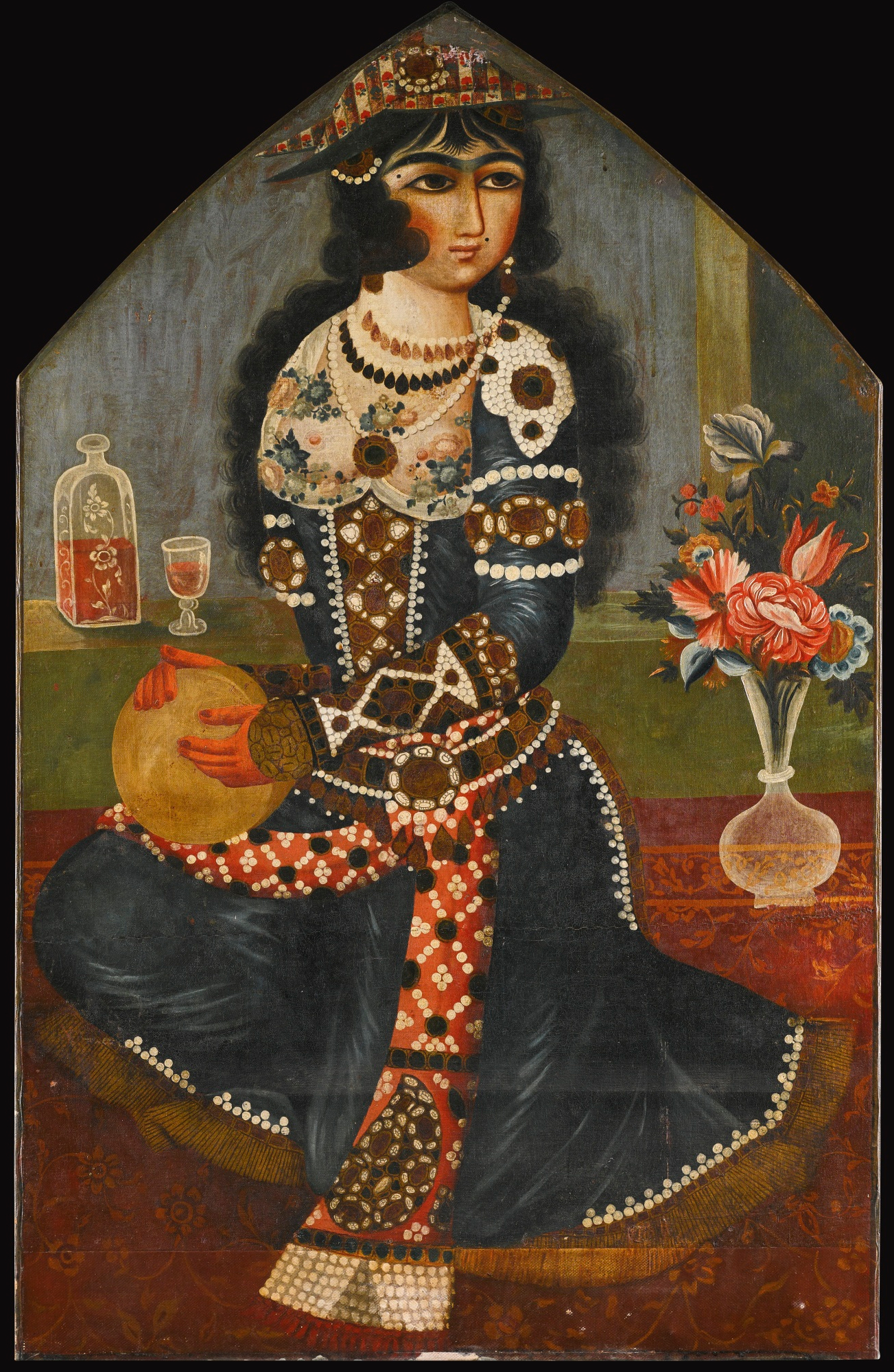
Woman playing Dayereh-zangi (دایره‌زنگی) or tambourine, ca 1820

=== Membranophones ===
Name in English	Name in Persian or other names	Description	Picture
Arkal		A kind of drum, possibly of the frame type.	
Arabaneh		A kind of frame drum, sometimes fitted with jingles. Possibly same as arbana, drum of Muslims in Kerala, India.	
Batare		A kind of frame drum, maybe the same as Daf. It should be mentioned that Bateri is the same as the English word Battery (sound of drum and also a kind of percussion instrument).	
Bendir بندیر	Bendayer	A large frame drum with thumb-hole on side. Today the Bendir is a typical frame drum. Similar instruments are common in the whole Near East from Morocco to Iraq and also in Northern Africa. A distinctive feature of this instrument is the set of snare strings fitted to the interior of the drum skin.	A man playing the bendir in Laghouat, Algeria
Chumlak-dombolak		A kind of Turkish-Egyptian Dombak with clay body	
Dabdab		kettledrum.	
Daf دف Dayereh دایره_(ساز) Riq رق	Dafif, Dap, Dareh, Dariye, Kichik Dap, Dizeh, Dofuf, Duff, Dup, Kafeh, Raq, Req, Rik, Riqq	The daf is one of the most ancient frame drums in Asia and North Africa. As a Persian instrument, in the 20th century, it is considered as a Sufi instrument to be played in Khaghan-s for Zikr music but now this percussion instrument has recently become very popular and it has been integrated into Persian art music successfully.: Dap/Dup Some believe that Dap or Dup is a Hebraic word (Hebrew תוף tof), which means stroke or beat and Daf is Arabicized of Dap. In Uyghuristan (Xinjiang of China) there are two kinds of frame drums. One is Dap and other that is smaller is Kichik Dap (Kichik literally means small). In Malaysia, Dup is a double-headed drum and is cylindrical in shape. Dup is usually used in the Ghazal and 'Gambuh' performance. The drumhead is of goat hide and it is beaten either with the hand or with cloth-padded drumsticks. The word "Dup" is an onomatopoeia.Dup - Malay community in Johor; Dofuf: Arabic pl. of Daf.; Dareh A kind of Persian frame drums same as Dayereh. It is played in folk music of Dezful city in Khuzestan province of Iran. There is a proverb that is: Dara seda nadara, which means Dareh, has not sound! Dara is a dialect of Dareh and Dareh in Dezful is called Dara. In Dezful Dar means coarse sieve.; Dayereh literally means circle. It is Persian frame drum, though Dayereh is an Arabic word. Some believe that Dayereh is the same as the Persian word Dareh.; Kafeh: A kind of Daf (frame drum) to be played by the palm of the hand. Kaffeh means circular thing.	Women playing dafs in Kurdistan. Iranian percussionist Majid Khalaj playing the dayereh Egyptian Riqq, also spelled riq, req.
Daf-e-chahar-gush		A kind of squared Daf. This percussion-skinned instrument is played in Egypt and Syria.	
Dammam دمام (ساز)	Damameh	May denote both a drum of bowl shape and a type of cylindrical drum.	Demam drums during Ramadan, Bushehr city, Iran. Instruments in photo struck with drumstick and open hand.
Damz		A kind of frame drum.	
Davat		A kind of drum to be stroke by Ghazib (drumstick).	
Dā'ira دایره (ساز) Dayereh-zangi (دایره‌زنگی)	Dayera	Frame drum.: Dā'ira means round tambourine (a reminder that older tambourines may have been square.; The modern dayera looks like a tambourine, without jingles. The dayereh-zangi has those jingles and is the same as the Tambourine. It's not absolute, but a difference between the daf and the dayereh-zangi can be the size; the daf is often larger, the dayereh smaller.	Woman playing dayereh-zangi or daf. The zangi refers to the metal disks embedded in the instrument's edge. See zang
Dohol دهل	Dobol, Gapdohol, Jure	A big cylindrical two-faced drum to be played by two special drumsticks. One is wooden thick stick that is bowed at the end and its name is Changal (or Kajaki). The other is thin wooden twig and its name is Deyrak. (In Hormozgan province of Iran, Dohol is played by two hands.) Dohol is the main accompaniment of Sorna (Persian Oboe, Turkish Zurna, Indian Shehnay and Chinese Suona).: Dabal, big drum. Dabalzan means Dabal player; Dobol: A dialect of Dohol in Shushtar city of Khuzestan province of Iran.; Dohol-e-baz: Small brazen Dohol to be played in the time of hunting in order to encourage the prey hawk (falcon) for hunting.; Gapdohol: A kind of Dohol to be played in Hormozgan province of Iran.; Jure: A kind of cylindrical drums same as Dohol to be used in folk music of Hormozgan province of Iran for accompanying Sorna (Persian Oboe, Turkish Zurna, Indian Shehnay and Chinese Suona) in wedding ceremonies or any other festive occasions.; Keser: A kind of Dohol to be played in Hormozgan province.; Tanbal: Tablak or Dohol.; Timbook: A kind of cylindrical drums same as Dohol.	Two dohol drums. Dohol دهل from Khorasan, played with curved drumstick. Called davul in Turkish.
Doholak		A Dohol from Baluchestan, played with both hands. Called Nal in Pakistan, Dholki in Mahashtra, India. The Dholak in India is a folk drum characterized by a cylindrical wooden shell covered with skin on both sides.: Nal. Another name for Doholak.	
Dulab		Sarcastic or ironical name of drum.	
Dulakvat		A kind of cylindrical drum, like the dohol, of Pakistan and Afghanistan.	
Ghaval		Azerbaijani frame drum with or without rings. Ghavalchi means Ghaval player.	
Ghodum	Kudum (in Turkey)	A kind of drum to be played in Turkish Sufi music.	Kudüm
Jam-Danbolak		A kind of drum similar to the Tonbak. Jam means "cup".	
Kaseh (کاسه‌): Kaseh-pil (کاسه‌پیل)	elephant (پیل) + bowl (کاسه‌)	Kaseh means "bowl"; in music is referring to a kettledrum. Kasehzan and Kasehgar both mean Kaseh player. Kaseh-pil: A kind of drum that was banded on elephant. See Ayine-pil.	Detail of Celebrations at the time of the marriage of Aurangzeb, cropped to show size of elephant drums
Khom		Kettledrum.: Khom-e-ruyin: A kind of Khom with brazen body.	
Koli		A Persian frame drum.	
Kube		In Arabic, Al-kube. An hourglass drum. Kube comes from the Persian verb Kubidan (to strike).	
Kus کوس (ساز)	Kas	Persian/Arab/Turkish Kettledrum.: Kös Turkish, from Persian.; Gavorga(ke): also called Kus (Kettledrum).; Kurka (e): A Turkish word. Same as Gavorga .; Kus-e-Ashkebus: Kus attributed to Ashkebus, famous commander of King Afrasiyab mentioned in masterpiece Shahnameh of the famous poet of Persia, Ferdosi.; Kus-e-dolat: Kettledrum to be played during the victories.; Kus-e-id: Kettledrum to be played during id (festival).; Kus-e-Iskandar: Kus attributed to Iskandar.; Kus-e-jang: Kettledrum used in wars in order to embolden and encourage the soldiers.; Kus-e-khaghani: Kettledrum for Khaghan (title of Chinese emperors).; Kus-e-Mahmudi: Kettledrum attributed to King Mahmud Ghaznavi.; Kus-e-rehlat: Kettledrum to be played during the decamping.; Kus-e-ruyin: Kettledrum with brazen body.; Kust: Another name of Kus mentioned in Shahnameh of Ferdosi.; Ruyin-khom: Kettledrum. Same as Khom-e-ruyin.	Large kettle drums from the Moghul Empire Camel drums in Cairo mark a marriage.
Mohre		A war drum	
Naqara ناقارا		Azerbaijani drum	Naqara
*Naqareh نقاره Naqqāra	Desarkutan, Naghghareh, Naker	A kind of drum to be stroke by Ghazib (drum stick).: Naqqāra, a kettledrum; Nakers were made of wood, metal, or clay and were sometimes equipped with snares. They were almost always played in pairs and were struck with hard sticks. They were probably tuned to high and low notes of identifiable pitch.; Desarkutan A kind of drum to be played in Mazandaran province of Iran. See Naghghareh-ye-Shomal; Naghghareh-ye-Fars: A kind of Naghghareh to be played in Fars province of Iran.; Naghghareh-ye-Sanandaj: A kind of Naghghareh to be played in Sanandaj city of Kurdistan province of Iran.; Naghghareh-ye-Shomal: A kind of Naghghareh to be played in North of Iran. Its name in Mazandaran province of Iran is Desarkutan. Desarkutan is the combination of the words De, Sar and Kutan that they respectively mean two, head and to beat.	Naqqāra-khāna or naubat (band). Features large nagaras on camel, smaller nagaras on horse, nafir trumpet and sorna (or zurna). Iraqi naqqarat A pair of gosh naghara.
Samma		A frame drum used in Sufi (mystic) music of Sistan-Baluchestan and other parts of southern Iran .	
Shaghf		A frame drum.	
Shahin-Tabbal	shahin-tabl	Pipe and tabor.: shāhin (شاهین) is a fife. ṭabl (فایف) is a drum. The two were allowed to be played together (with reservations as an old/pre-Islamic combination).; Shahin means royal falcon, but refers here to a wind instrument. Tabbal means drummer. Shahin-Tabbal is a person who plays Shahin by one hand and Tabl (drum) by the other one.	
Tabare	Tabire	Tabire means drum. In Arabic it means Tabl. In French encyclopedia of Littreé it has been mentioned that the French word Tabur (small drum used in medieval times to accompany folk-dancing) comes from the Persian word Tabire.: Tabur An Eastern percussion instrument called Tambour there, which immigrated westward.; Taburak: A kind of frame drum. The word comes from Tabire, with a diminutive suffix "ak" and means small Tabire.	
Ṭabl طبل	Kabar	Drum.: ṭabl is a generalized word for drum, any kind of drum; ṭabl-e-baz: A kind of drum to be used in the time of hunting. See Dohol-e-baz.; ṭabl ṭawīl, ordinary long drum; ṭabl al-mukhannath, hourglass-shaped drum	Ṭabl, name for any kind of drum.
Tablak	Doplak, Gushdarideh	Small drum: Tanbal: Tablak or Dohol.	
Tas طاس (ساز)	Tasht	Small copper bowl drum covered with sheep or cow skin and beaten with a drumstick, or leather or rubber straps. The instrument may be related to the Indian Tasa or Tasha drums. Alternatively is copper bowls without skin, called Jal-Tarang in India. Tasht means tub or basin. Tashtgar means Tasht player. Russian Turkestan, circa 1869. Tas (left), qairaq or kairak right. In another photo from the series, the back of the tas shows it has no drumhide, but is sounded like a cymbal.	Tas from Kurdistan
Tempo		A goblet drum similar to Turkish-Arabic Dumbek or Darbuka.	
Tiryāl	Tirpal	a type of frame drum/tambourine	
Tombak تمبک Tonbak (تنبک) Zarb (ضَرب)	Dombak, Dombalak, Donbak, Zarb	Tonbak: Persian goblet drums. There are many names for this instrument. Some of them are: 1. Dombar 2. Dombarak 3. Tabang 4. Tabnak 5. Tobnak 6. Tobnok 7. Tobnog 8. Tonbik 9. Tonbook 10. Tontak 11. Khonbak 12. Khombak 13. Khommak 14. Damal 15. Dambal 16. Donbalak 17. Dombalak 18. Khoorazhak 19. Khomchak 20. Tonbak 21. Tombak 22. Donbak 23. Dombak 24. Zarb.: Dombak: Another name of Tonbak. It is derived from the Pahlavi (Persian ancient language) word, Dombalak.; Dombalak: Pahlavi name of Tonbak.; Dombalak-e-ayyubi: Dombalak attributed to Ayyub (a Middle Eastern rhythm played in belly dance).; Donbak: Another name of Tonbak.; Donbalak-e-Moghren: An ancient drum that was a pair of Tombaks.; Khombak: Another name for Tonbak. Khomak: Khom-e-ruyin. It literally means small barrel. There is a kind of cylindrical drum in Bengal and its name is Khomok. The khomok of the Baul people of Bengal is also known as a khamak, anandalahari, and gubgubi. It looks like a small drum with a wooden body and a skinhead. The head is pierced with a string attached to a small piece of wood or metal to prevent it from passing all the way through the skin. The other end of the string travels through the instrument to come out the bottom opening and is attached to a small brass handle. The khomok is played by placing the drum body under the arm and pulling on the handle thus pulling the string and placing tension on the drum skin. The string is plucked while the tension on the string is varied, producing a surprising vocal-like sound. Some khomok have two strings that are played at the same time increasing both the volume and complexity of the sound.; Khonb: Khom. Same as Khonbak.; Khonbak: Some believe that Khonbak was a small Kettledrum with metallic body. Then it was made of clay and now it is made of wood and it is same as today Tonbak.; Tonbak-e-zourkhaneh: A slightly larger than normal Tonbak to be played in zourkhaneh (Traditional Persian Gymnasium). Zourkhaneh literally means house of power.; Tonbak-e-bazmi: A kind of Tonbak to be played in parties.; Tonbak-e-razmi: Tonbak-e-zourkhaneh.; Tonbak-e-Ta'lim: A kind of Tonbak for training the athletes in zourkhaneh (Traditional Persian Gymnasium).; Tonbook: Another name of Tonbak.; Zarb (ضَرب): Another name of Tonbak. Zarbgir is old expression for Tonbak player and it comes from the verb Zarb gereftan that means to play on Zarb.; Zarb-e-zourkhaneh: A kind of Tonbak to be played in zourkhaneh (Traditional Persian Gymnasium). Zourkhaneh literally means house of power.; Zarbuleh: A kind of goblet drum to be played in North Africa and Syria. In Syria it is covered with fish-skin and in North Africa with goatskin; Tabang: Another name of Tonbak (Persian goblet drum).	Early to mid 19th-century zarb, part of Qajar Iran. Madjid Khaladj playing Tombak
Zirbaghali	Zerbaghali	A goblet drum with a body made of clay. It is similar to the tonbak and used in Afghanistan. The skin has a black spot called siyahi, made of tuning paste. Drum influenced by India with technique that draws on Persian Tonbak and Indian tabla and darbuka.	
Zu-jalal		A kind of frame drum with bells.	
zorkhaneh beat ضرب زورخانه		Clay-bodied drum with hide stretched across, used by a Murshid (mentor) in a zorkhaneh gym to guide the exercise. Used alongside the Zang-e-zourkhaneh bell (زنگ زورخانه ای). The name is actually the name of the rhythm or drum-beat, applied to the instrument.	Zorkhaneh drum and zang-e-zourkhaneh bell, right side of image.

=== Idiophones ===
Name in English	Name in Persian or other names	Description	Picture
Alvah		It is a set of wooden or metallic plates that is played by being struck with sticks.	
Ayine-pil (آیینه پیل)		A metal gong, beaten with sticks – so large that it had to be carried by elephant and played by a mounted musician.	
Boshghabak		Small cymbal to be used by dancers.	
Chini		A shaken percussion instrument used in military bands. It consists of an earthenware body hung with small bells.	
Ghashoghak		Castanets.	
Gong	Khar-mohre	Metal disk with a turned rim giving a resonant note when struck with a stick. Gong apparently is of Chinese origin.: Khar-mohre: A kind of Gong.; Naghus: Gong.	
Jalājil (Arabic, جلجل)	Ghalāghil, Juljul	Jalājil is plural of Juljul. Arabic word for bells. The word may have spread as far as Nepal where a type of cymbal is called Jhyali. Juljul can also be used of the bells hung on herd animals. Ancient bell, Western Iran, circa 150 B.C. - 224 A.D. Ancient bell, Western Iran, circa 1000-650 B.C.	Ancient bell, Western Iran, circa 1000-650 B.C.
kozeh (saz) کوزه (ساز)		Used in the music of Bandar Abbas, Iran and some other cities in southern Iran	Kozeh. Instrument made from imitation of Udu from Africa.
Kastan قاشقک (ساز)		two bowl or shell-shaped finger-clappers that dancers wear on their fingers, clapped together rhythmically while dancing.	Wooden kastan, shaped like shells
Naqus ناقوس		Historically, a wooden plank hit with a hammer or tapped on cobblestone to make clanking noise. In modern Persian, naqus (ناقوس) means bell. According to Islamic tradition, the companions of Muhammad were unsure of what the sign for the daily prayers (salāt) should be. Mohammad therefore decided between a fire, a bell, a Jewish horn (shofar) and the nāqūs for the muezzin's call to prayer (adhān). Apparently, in the early days of Fustat, the Muslims struck the nāqūs as an early-morning call to prayer. The sound of the nāqūs as a call to prayer was heard along with the crowing of the cocks. As a wooden plank, it was considered by Muhammed to signal a call to prayer. Early use among Muslims, Jewish people and Christians. Later known mainly as Christian instrument, allowed to be used in Muslim areas instead of a bell (which was louder and more disruptive).	Instruments which fit as naqus, both a board and a metal gong. These are from Romania, used in Orthodox Christianity today.
Senj sinj سِنج (Plural ṣunūj) Sanj سنج	Boshqābak, Chalab, Chalap, Zang, Tal	Large cymbal played in mourning ceremonies. A smaller version, by contrast, is used in festive ceremonies. His elephant-attendants' crowns of gold, Their golden girdles and their golden torques, Their golden Sanj (cymbals) and their golden Zang (bells)... --Shahname: In moderns use, senj (سِنج) is the same as cymbal.; As they have been transcribed into European script, sanj and sinj have been confused. Farmer makes it clear that sinj was the cymbals, while sanj was the jank. However, in the Arabic and Persian scripts, diacritical marks to indicate vowels are optional, and sanj/sinj are spelled the same.; ṣunnūj ṣaghīra, small metal castanets used by dancers (now called Zill)	Sanj, large cymbals or crash cymbals go back into antiquity; these are from Mesopotamia, 3rd millennium B.C. Military band behind Emperor Humayun includes sanj.
Saz-e-fulad		A percussion instrument made 35 metallic plates of different sizes. Fulad (Arabicized of Pulad) means "steel". Saz means "musical instrument".: Saz-e-kubei: Percussion instrument. Kubei (from the verb Kubidan) means "percussion" and means to beat or strike.; Saz-e-zarbi: Percussion instrument. Zarbi means rhythmic composition.; Saz-e-zarbi-ye-pusti: Percussion skinned instrument. Pust and pusti mean "skin" and "skinned".	
Zang زنگ		Zang-e zurchaneh, bells used in Zurkhaneh power house, Iran Persuan word for bells.: Zang-e-zourkhaneh (زنگ زورخانه ای): A kind of Zang to be played in zourkhaneh (Traditional Persian Gymnasium). Not finger cymbals but hanging bells.; zang-i kaftar, bells worn on the wrist; zang-e schotor, camel bells, larger bells, small bells, bells attached to cloth (as neck band or knee band), clusters of bells suspended from larger bells; Zangol: Another name of Zang.; Zangolicheh: Small Zang or Jaras. It comes from Zangol and the diminutive suffix "cheh".; Zanguleh: Small bell.	Akbar riding an elephant. The elephant has multiple bells, as well as chains that jingle. zang-e schotor, camel bells Zang, braclet of bells from Uzbekistan
*Zang-e-sarangoshti sanj angshati سنج انگشتی Zill		Finger cymbals made of copper, played per pairs fixed on the inch and the major one of each hand. Mainly employed to stress the dance, one finds them in particular present in the miniatures Persians on figurines dancers of the beginning of the century, and in the past on low-relieves. Their existence seems to go back to immemorial times. Names in Persian relate to the Sanj (sanj angshati) and the zang (Zang-e-sarangoshti)	
Zanjir زنجی	Zanchir in Pahlavi	Zanjir means chain. It is a string or loop of hawk bells, able to be hung. It sounds by shaking. Portrait of Kay Khusraw, by Mihr 'Ali, Qajar Iran, Isfahan 1803-4, cropped to show hawk. Hawk has on hawk bells, not a zanjir string, but 2 single bells.	Grotesque dancer wearing Zanjir (زنجی).

=== Shaken idiophones ===
Name in English	Name in Persian or other names	Description	Picture
Akhlakandu	Ajlakandu	A very ancient percussion instrument. It was a type of rattle made from a skull part-filled with small stones. Its modern name is Jeghjeghe meaning simply 'rattle'. It was played by being shaken.	
Chaghaneh	Chaghabeh	A type of gourd rattle, filled with small stones. Used by dancers.	
Jeghjeghe جغجغه		Persian rattle. Today in Iran it is considered as an instrument for entertaining children.	
Qairaq	kairak	Musical instruments of the Tajiks, also used by Uzbeks and in Afghanistan. Flat river stones, held in pairs and shaken; makes clicking and rattling noise; some sounds are similar to castanets.	Qairaq from Afghanistan. From the Metropolitan Museum of Art.
name not known		hollow bracelets with beads inside, rattles when musician/dancer moves their arm	Bracelets made in Egypt, 11th century A.D.

=== Lamellophones ===
Name in English	Name in Persian or other names	Description	Picture
Ghopuz	Zanburak	Jaw harp of Turkmen Sahra of Iran.	

== Images from Turkestan ==
These images are from the Russian Turkestan, circa 1865-1872, an area in which Persian, Turkish, Arab/Islamic and Mongol peoples conquered and settled over the ages. When the Russians conquered, both Turkish and Persian languages were being spoken. The images of musical instruments show the mixing of cultures; some such as the tanbur appear normal for Persian culture. But there are variations, such as a kamanche that appears to be a bowed tanbur, and the kauz or kobyz, which is a Turkish word for an instrument that is closely related to the Ghaychak, a Persian instrument.

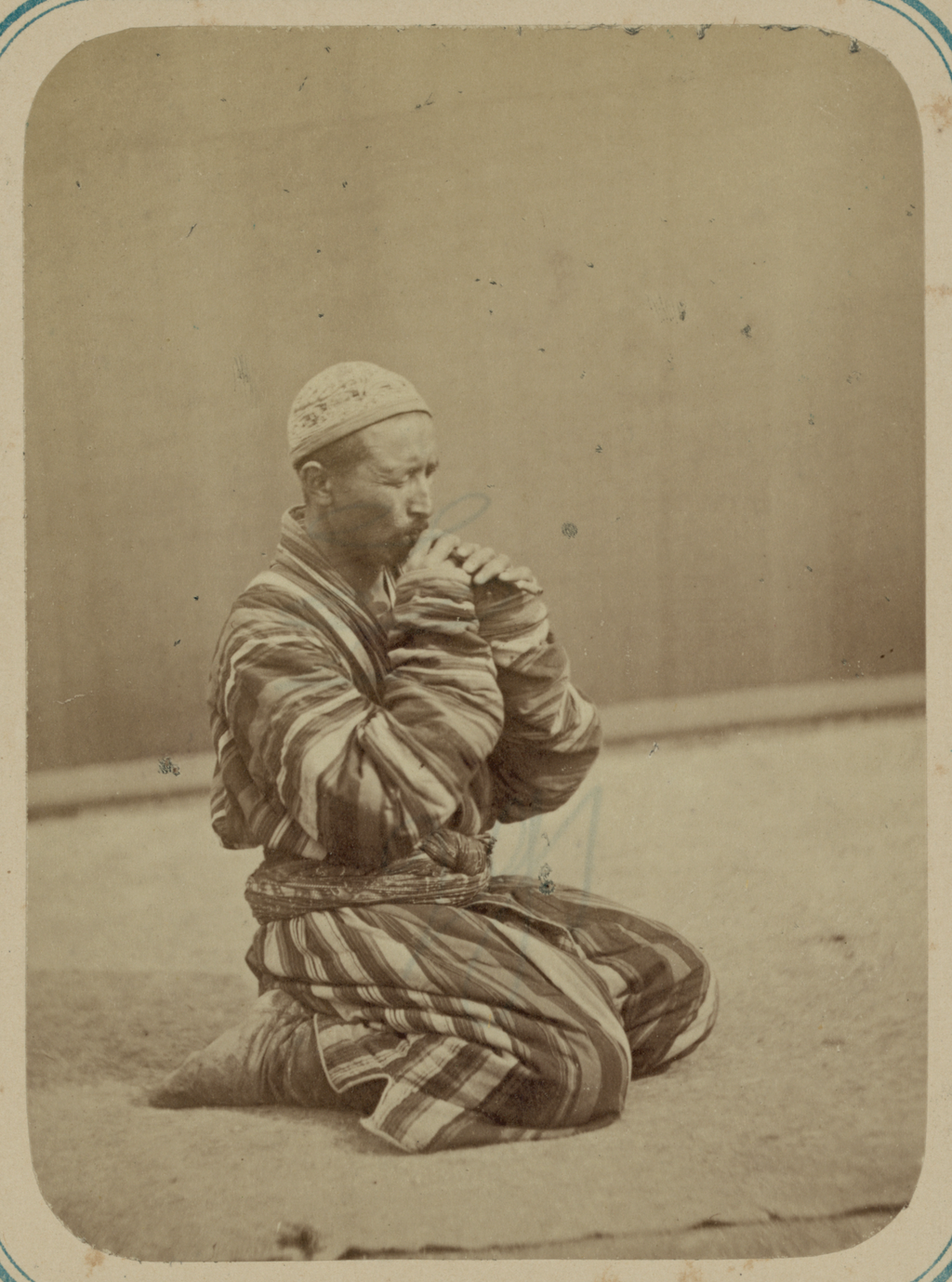
Russian Turkestan, about 1872. Dozaleh or "koshnai"

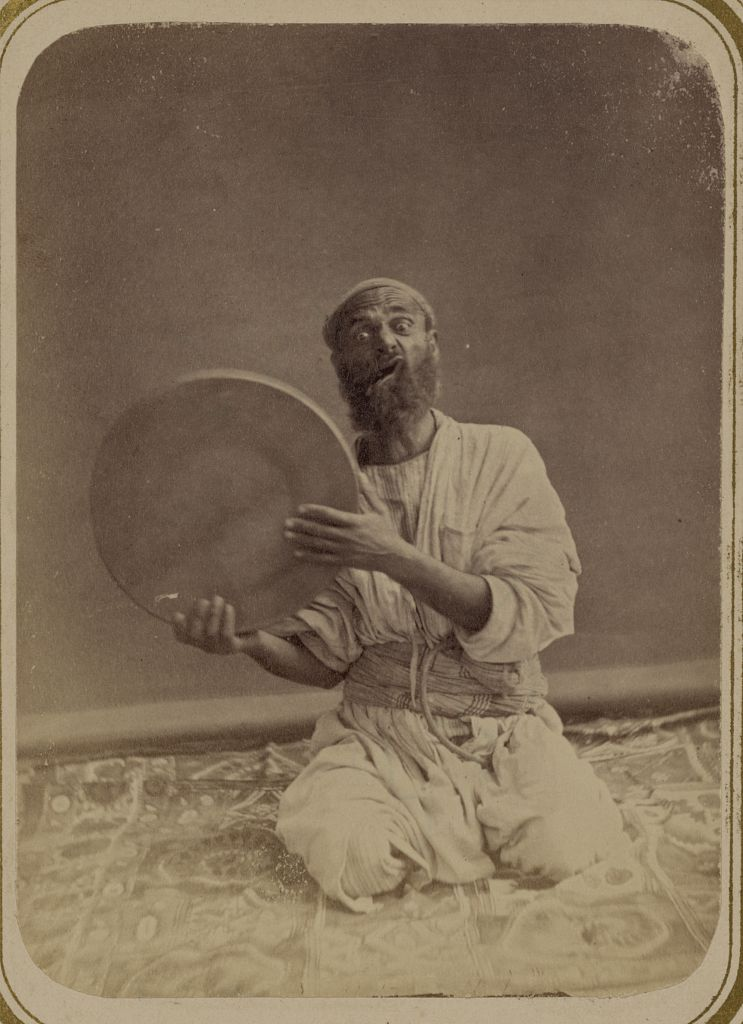
Dayra

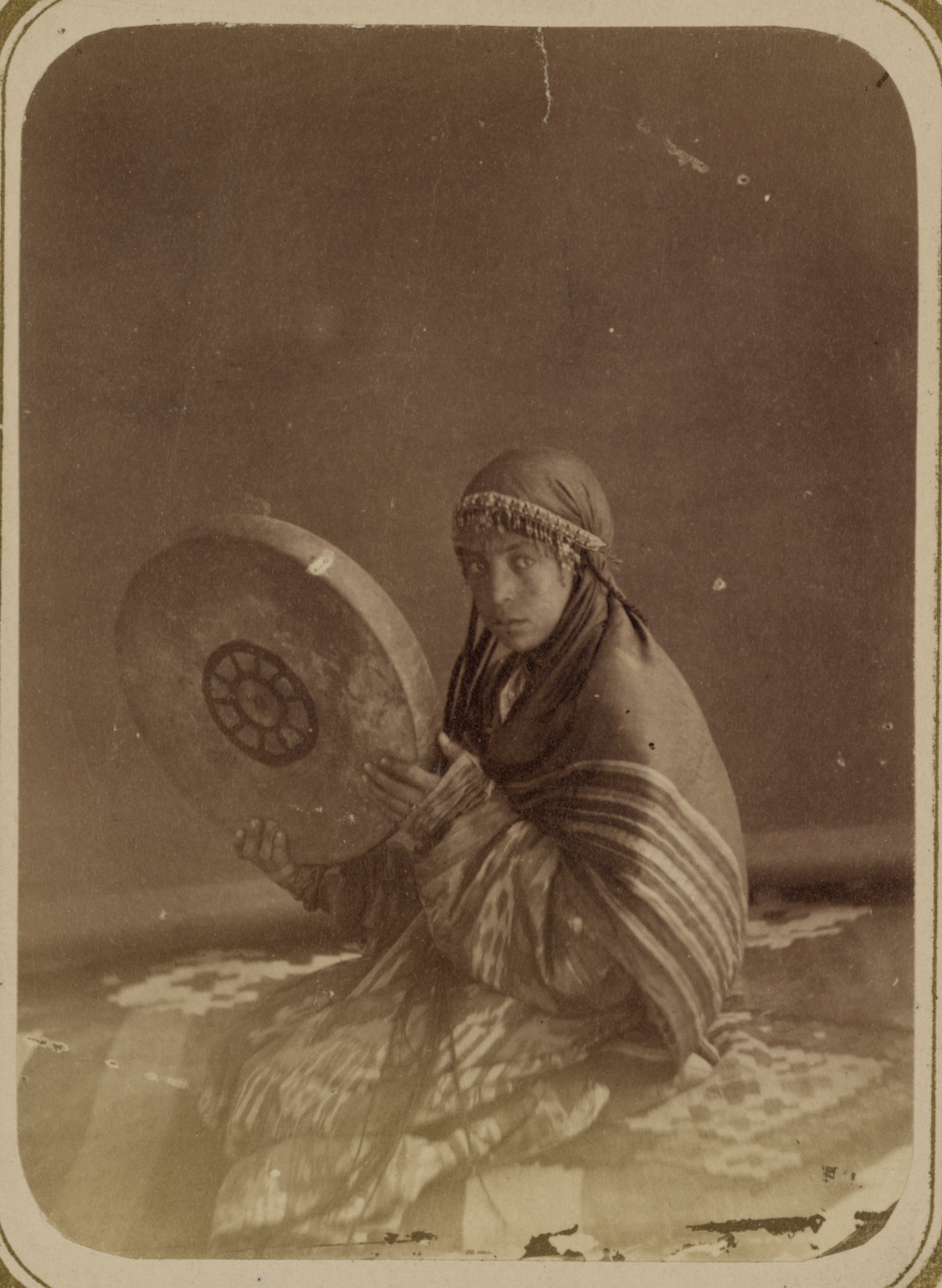
Dayereh

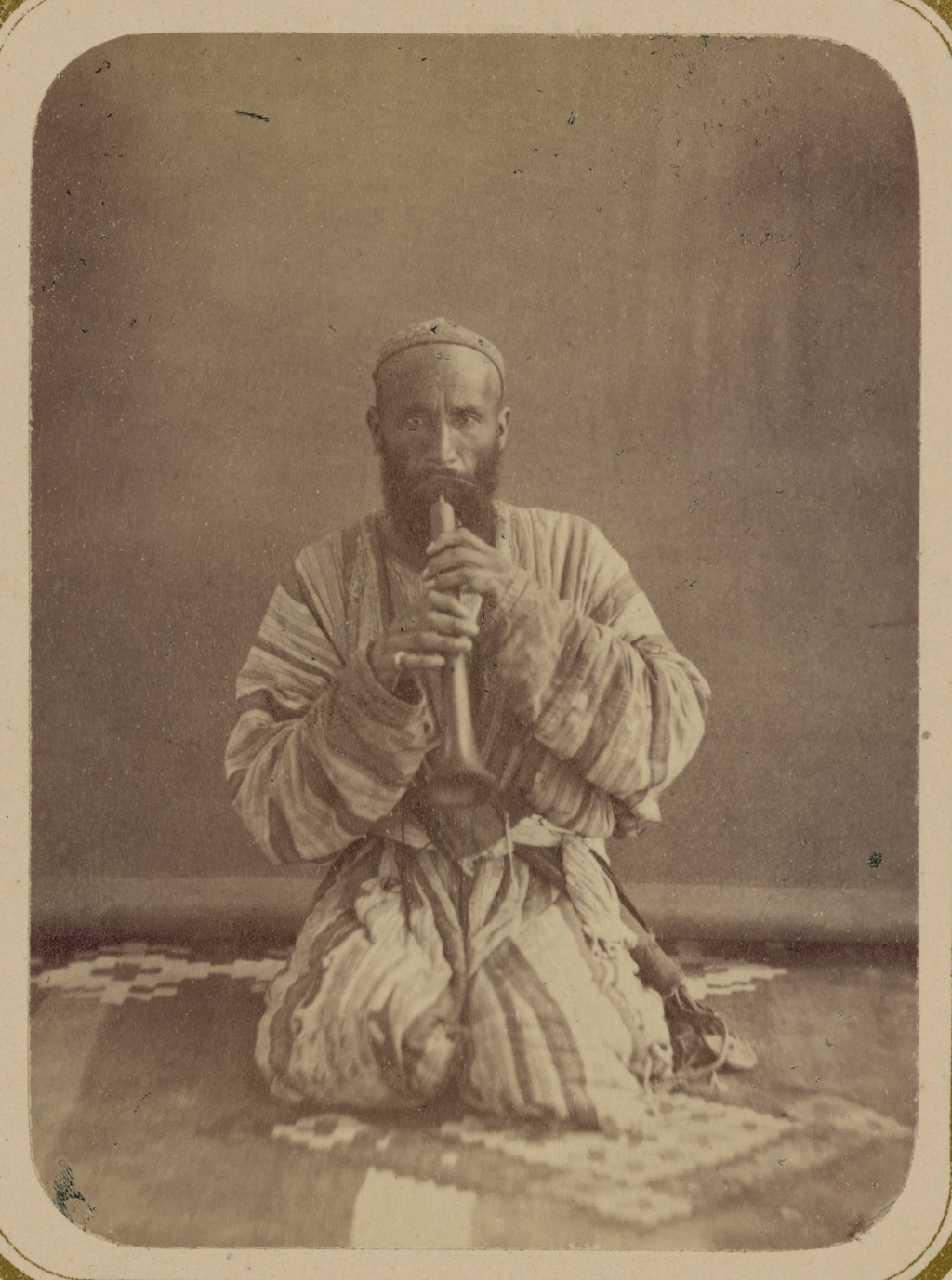
Sorna.

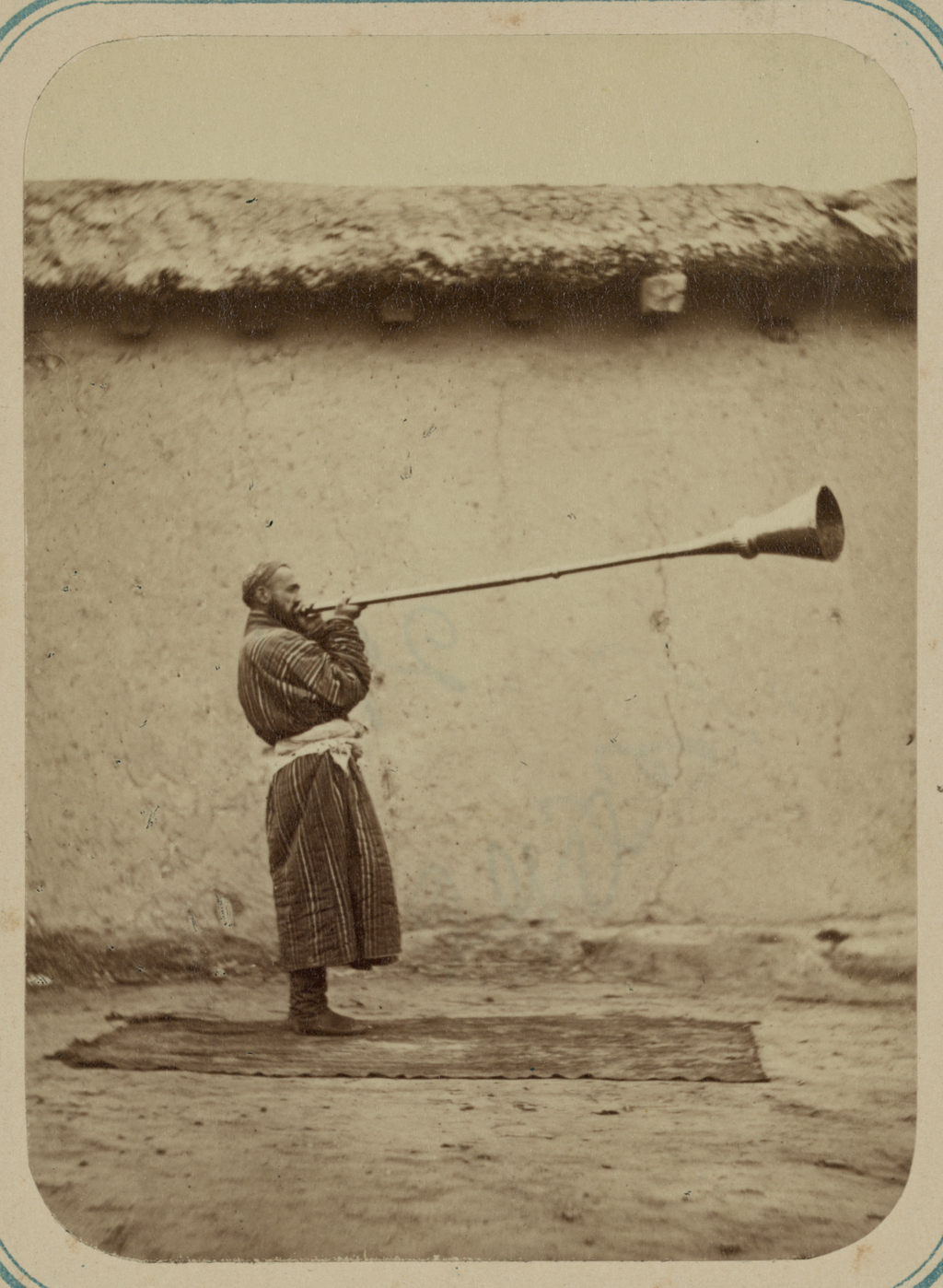
Karnay

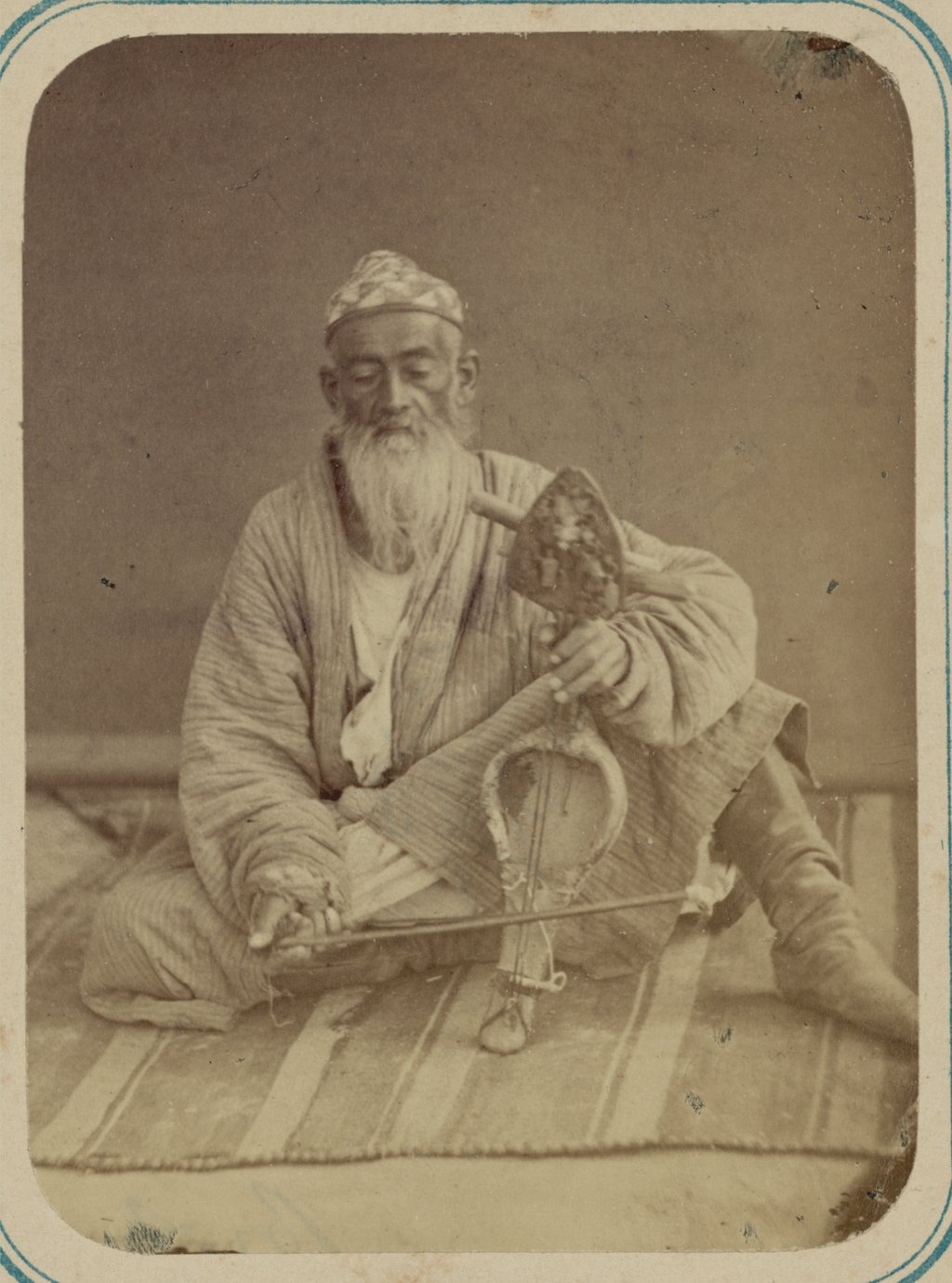
Kauz or Kobyz. Also spelled qobuz.

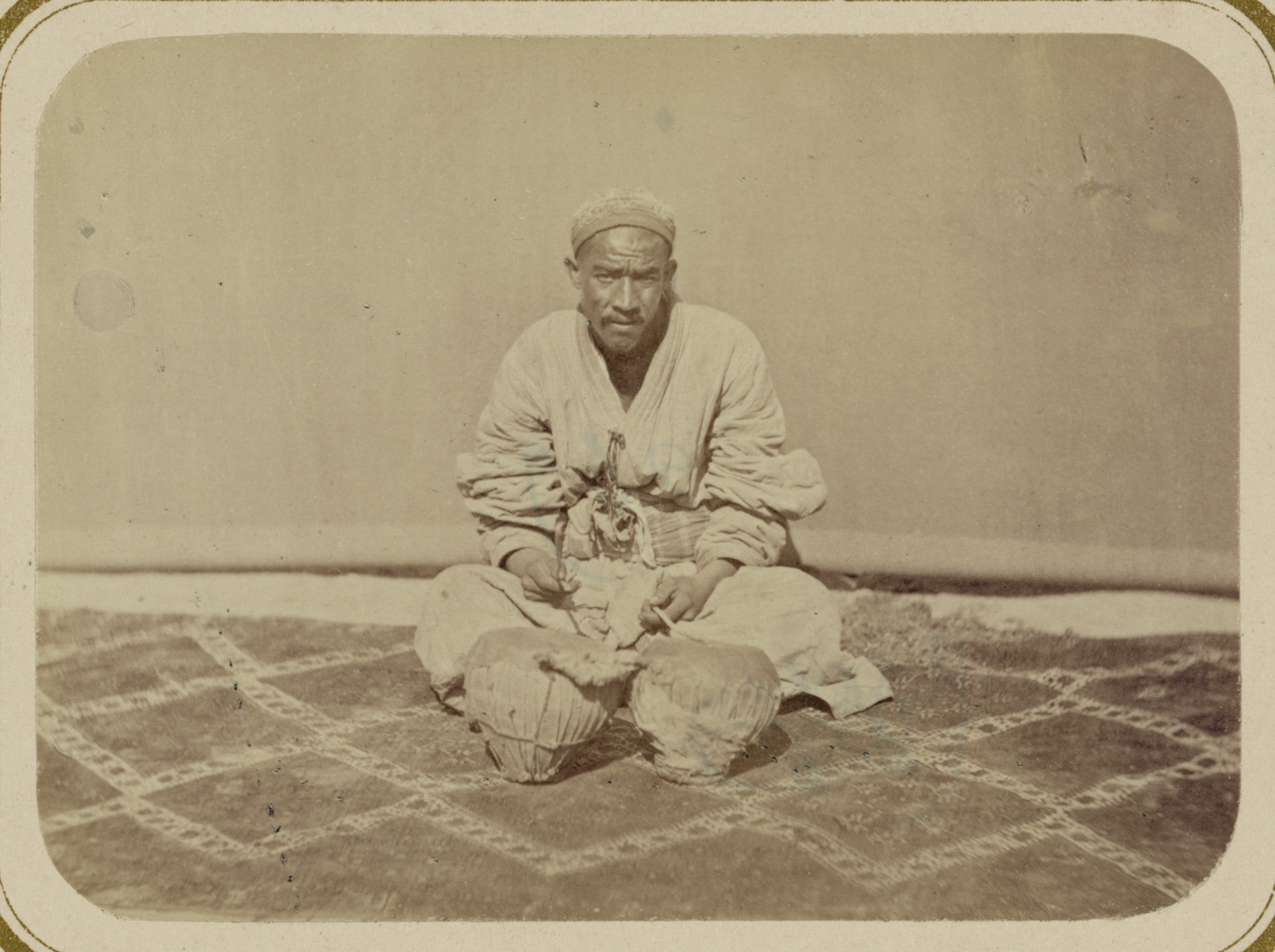
Nagara

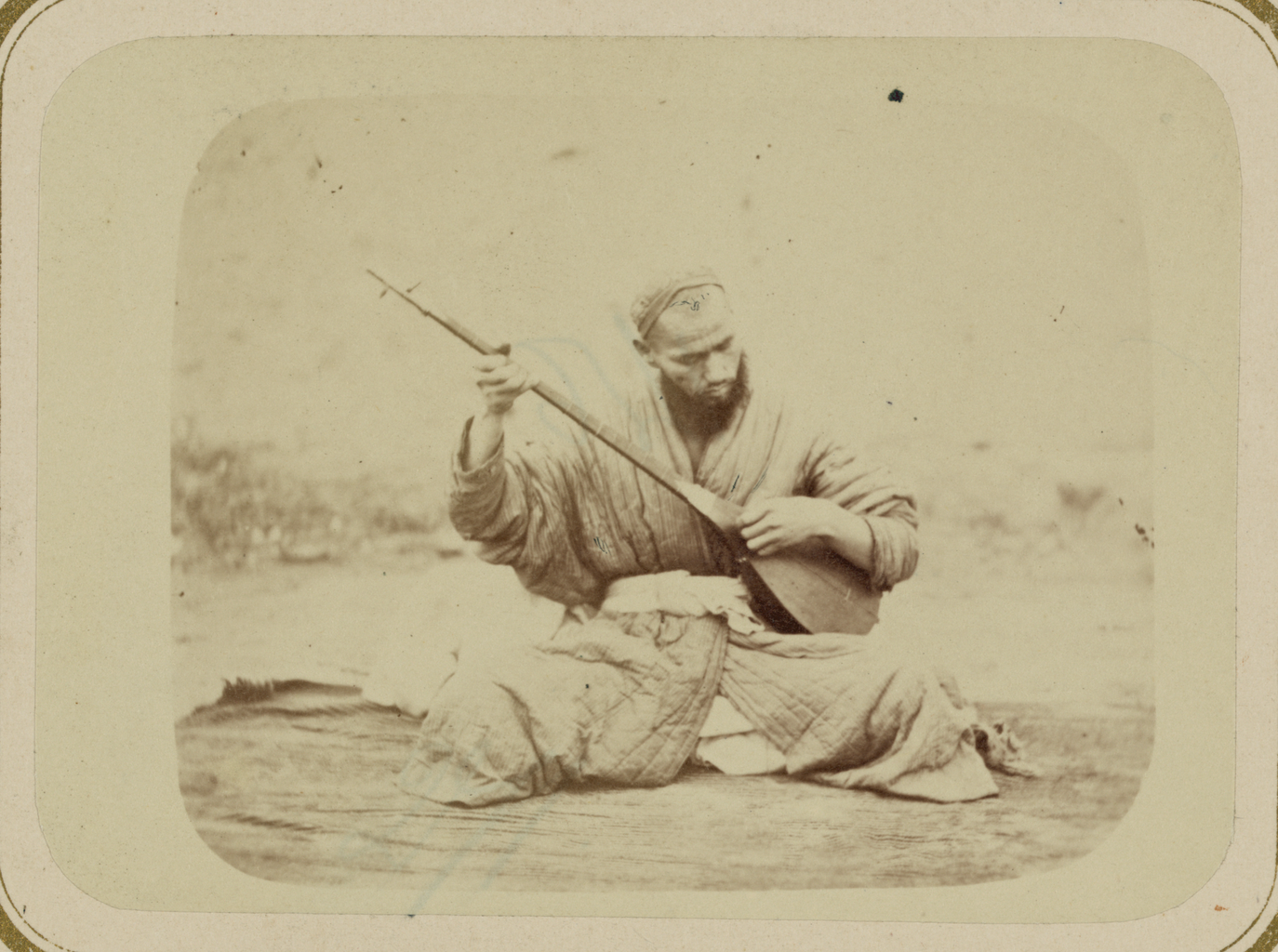
Dutar

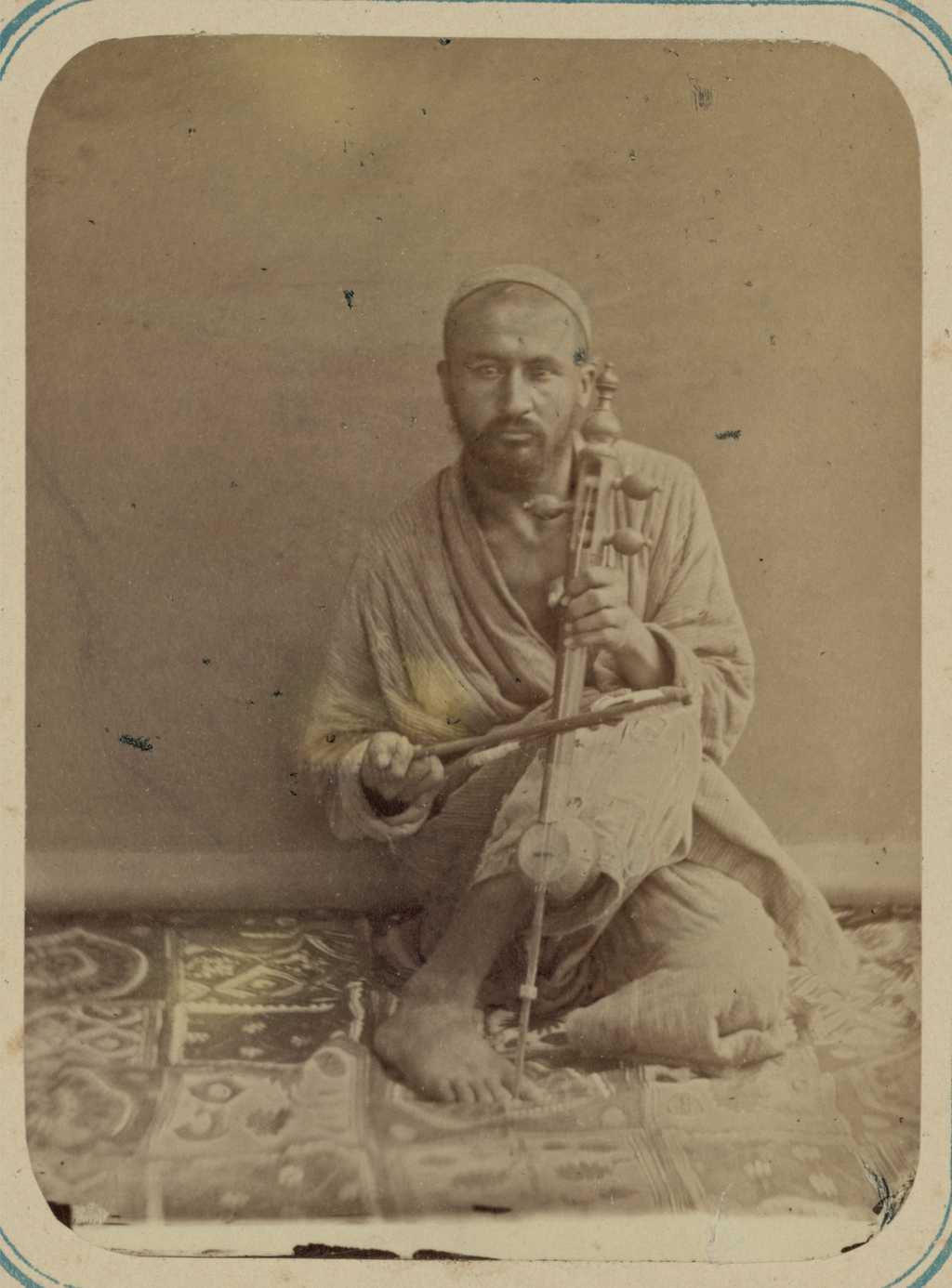
Gydzhak. Instrument in the Kamanche tradition. Not a Ghaychak; the name variation applied to two different fiddles.

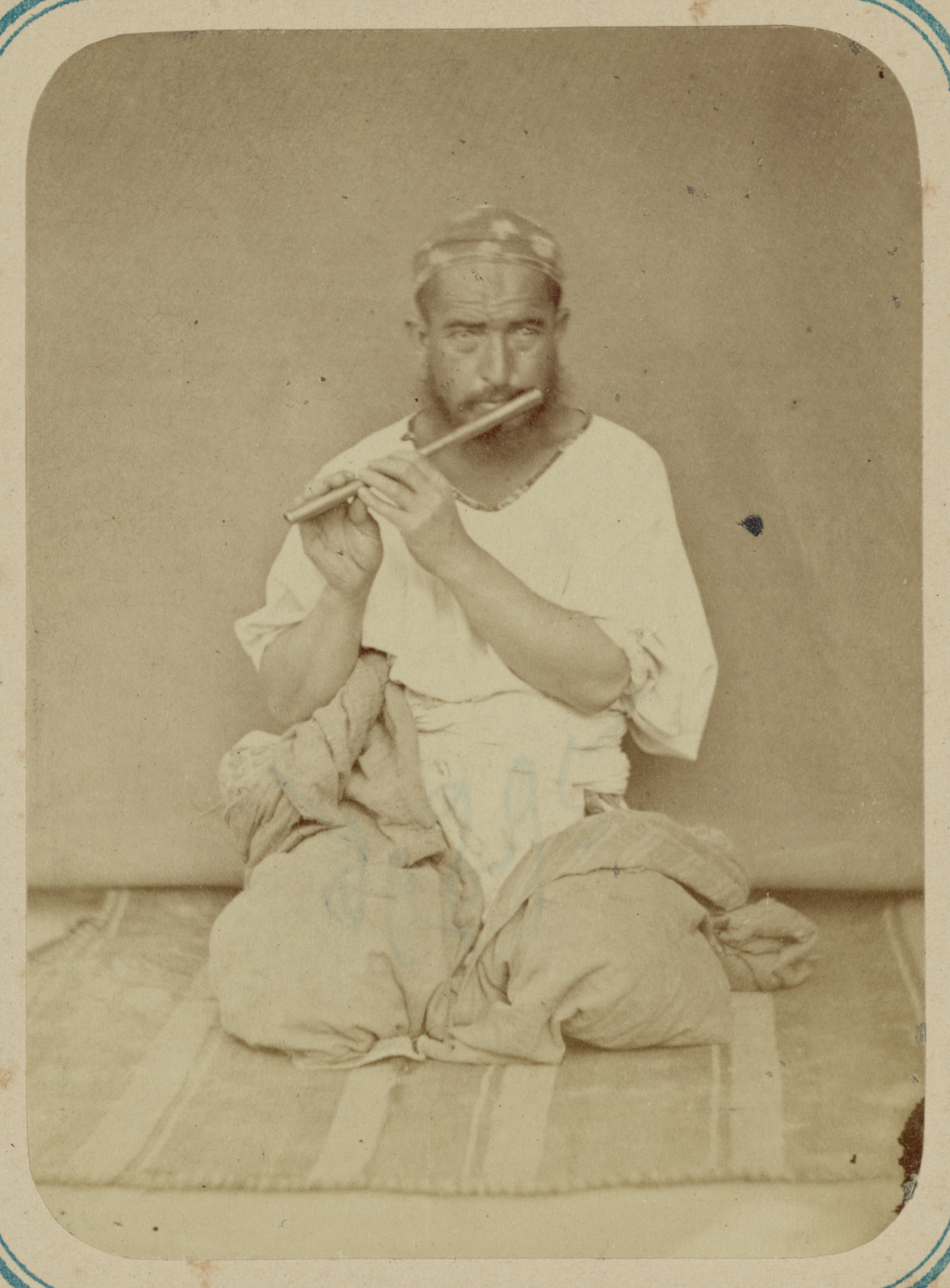
The nai in Turkestan was side-blown, like the flutes in Uzbekistan, Tajikistan, and Karakalpakstan.

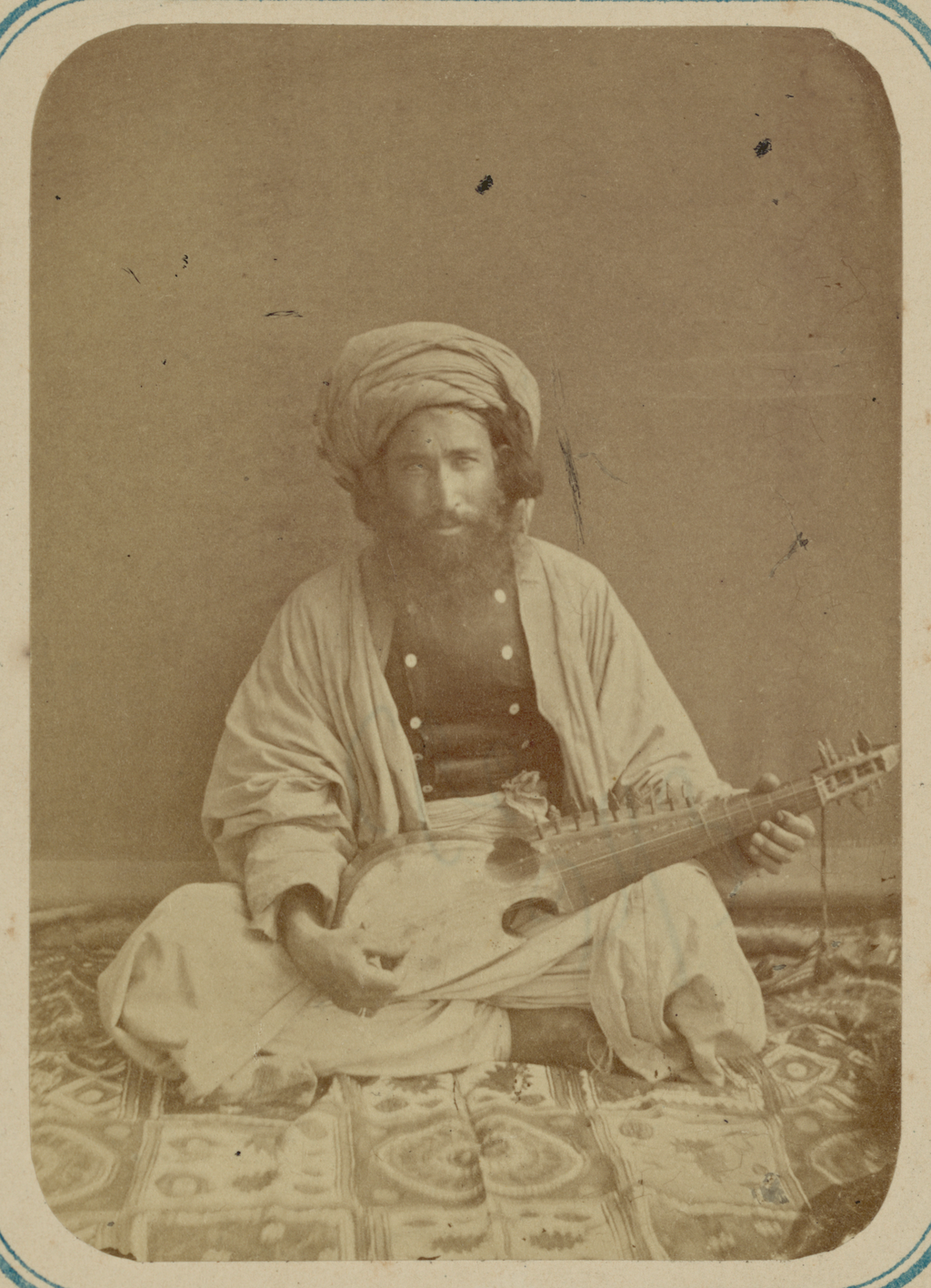
Rubab

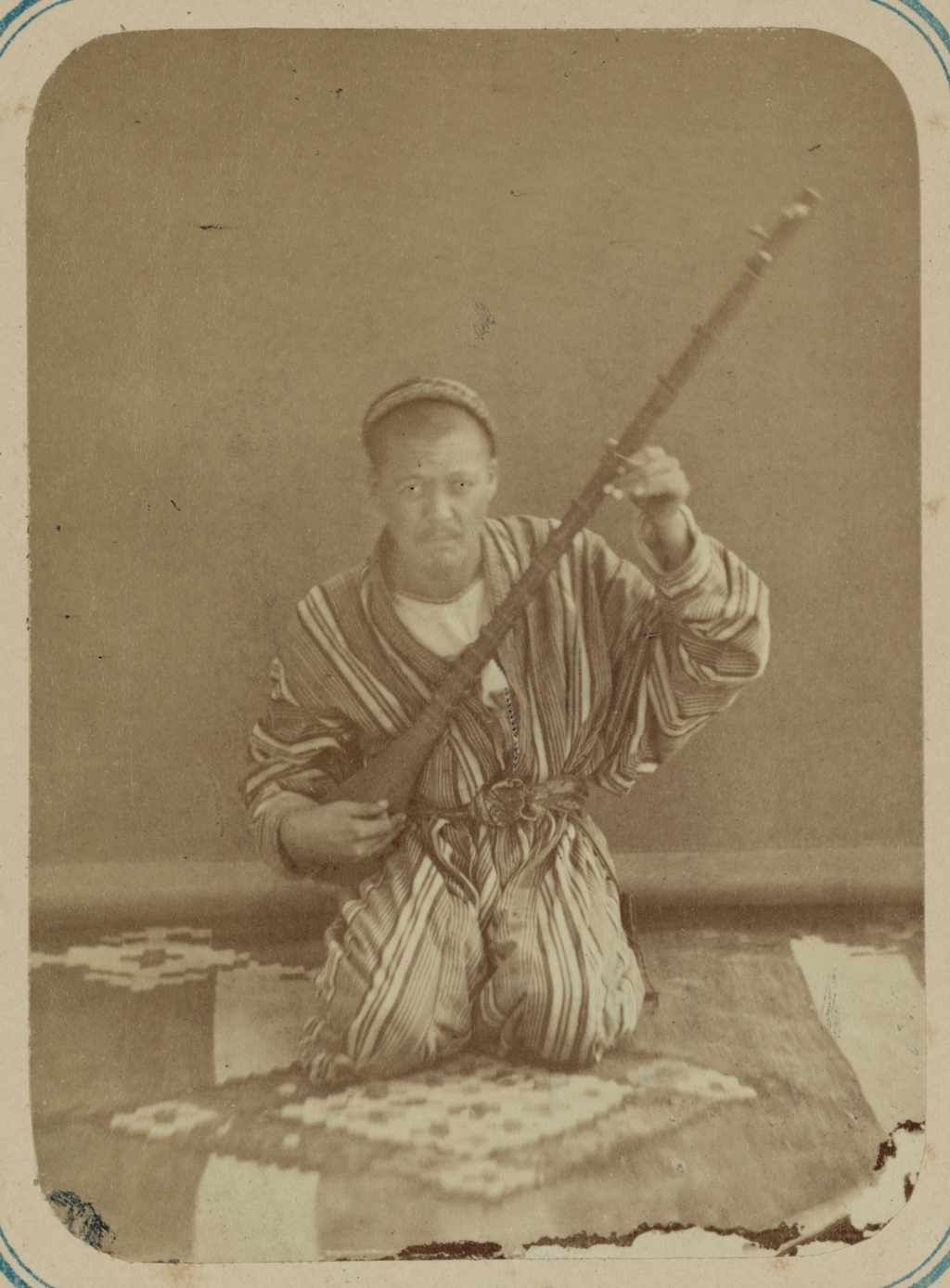
Tanbur

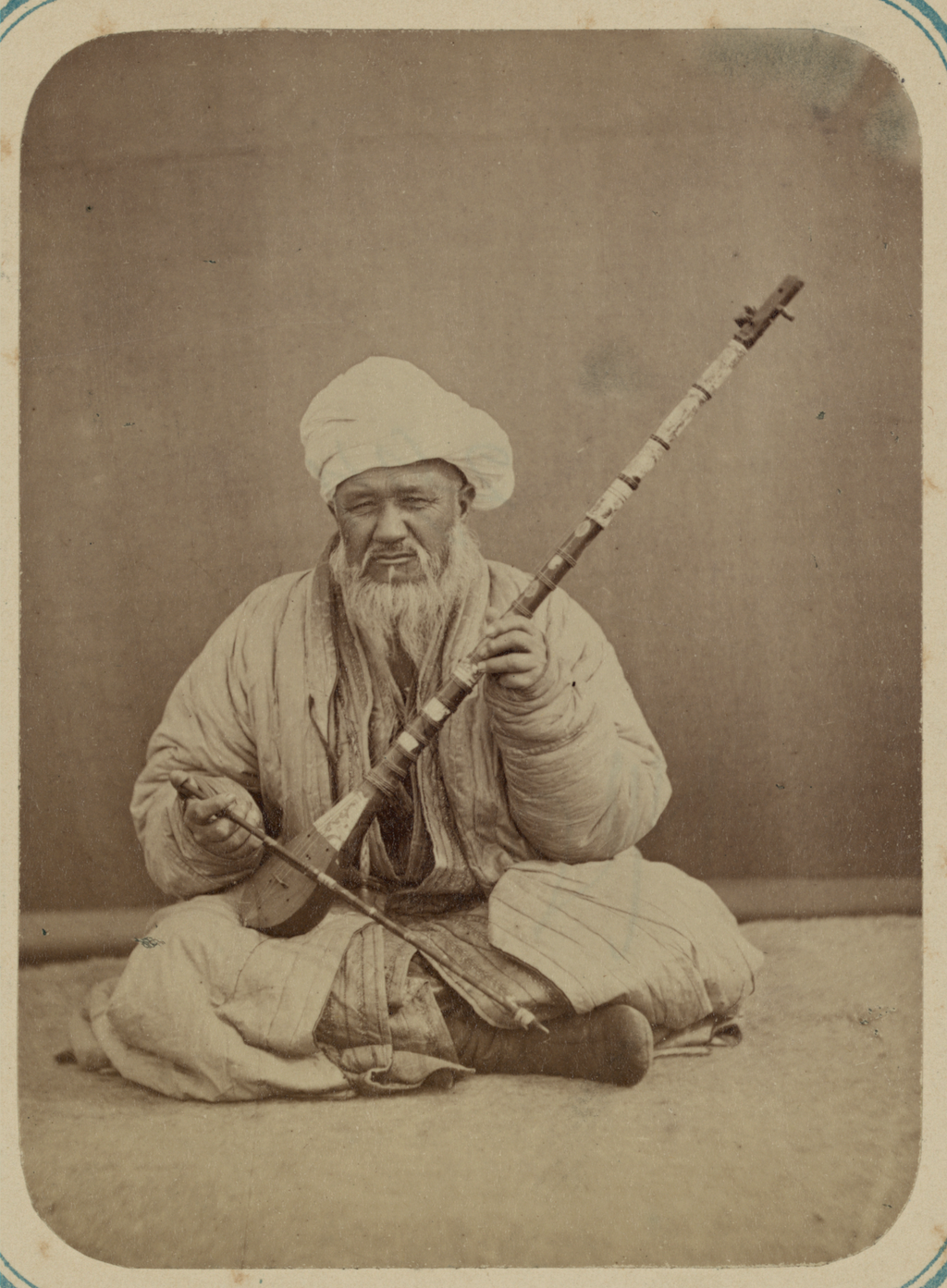
The "Mashki" Kamanche, possibly related to the sato

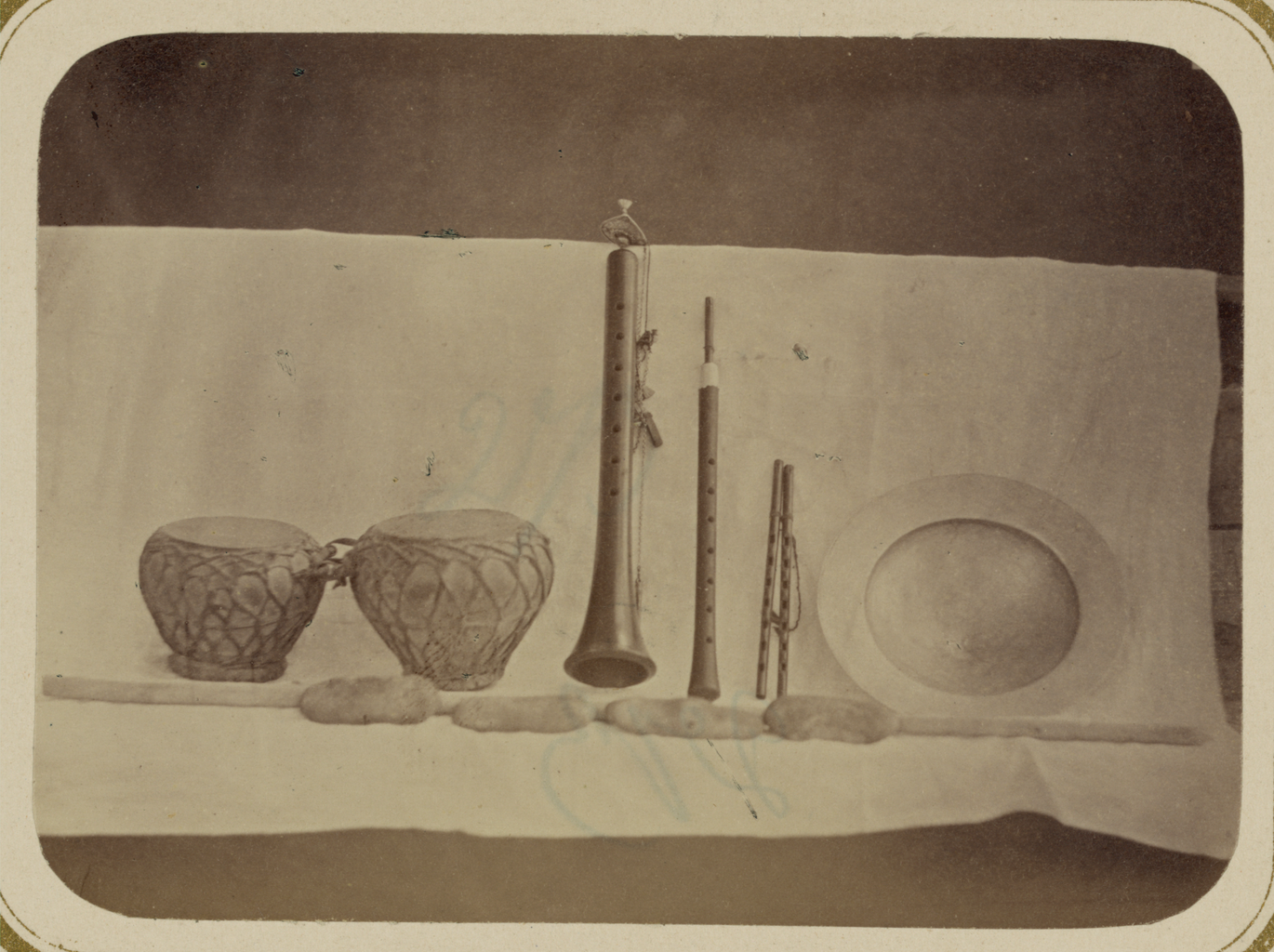
from left: nagaras, sorna, bülban, ghoshmeh, tas

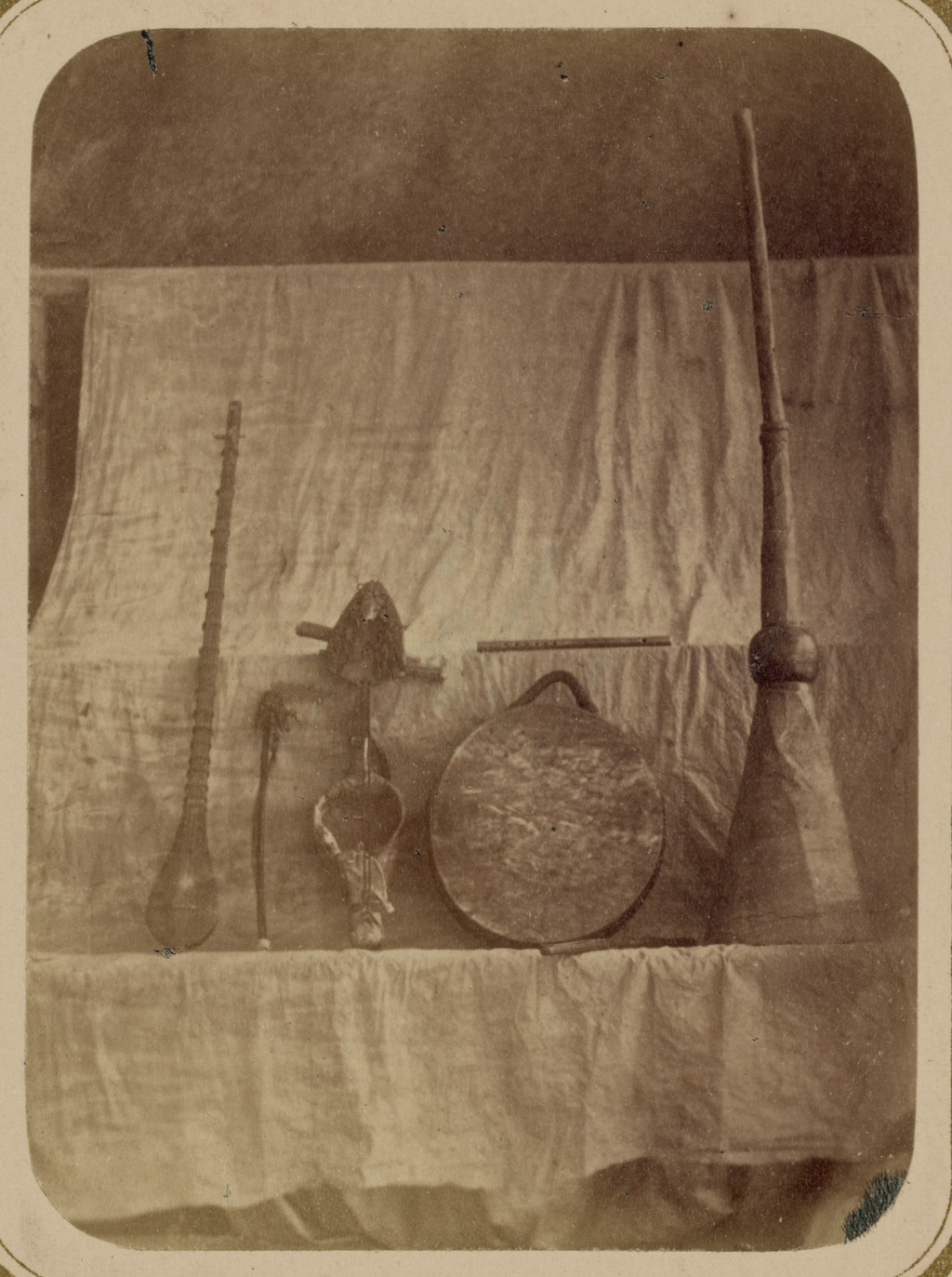
From left: dutar, kauz or kobyz, frame drum with drumstick, karnay, ney (horizontal variation, above drum).

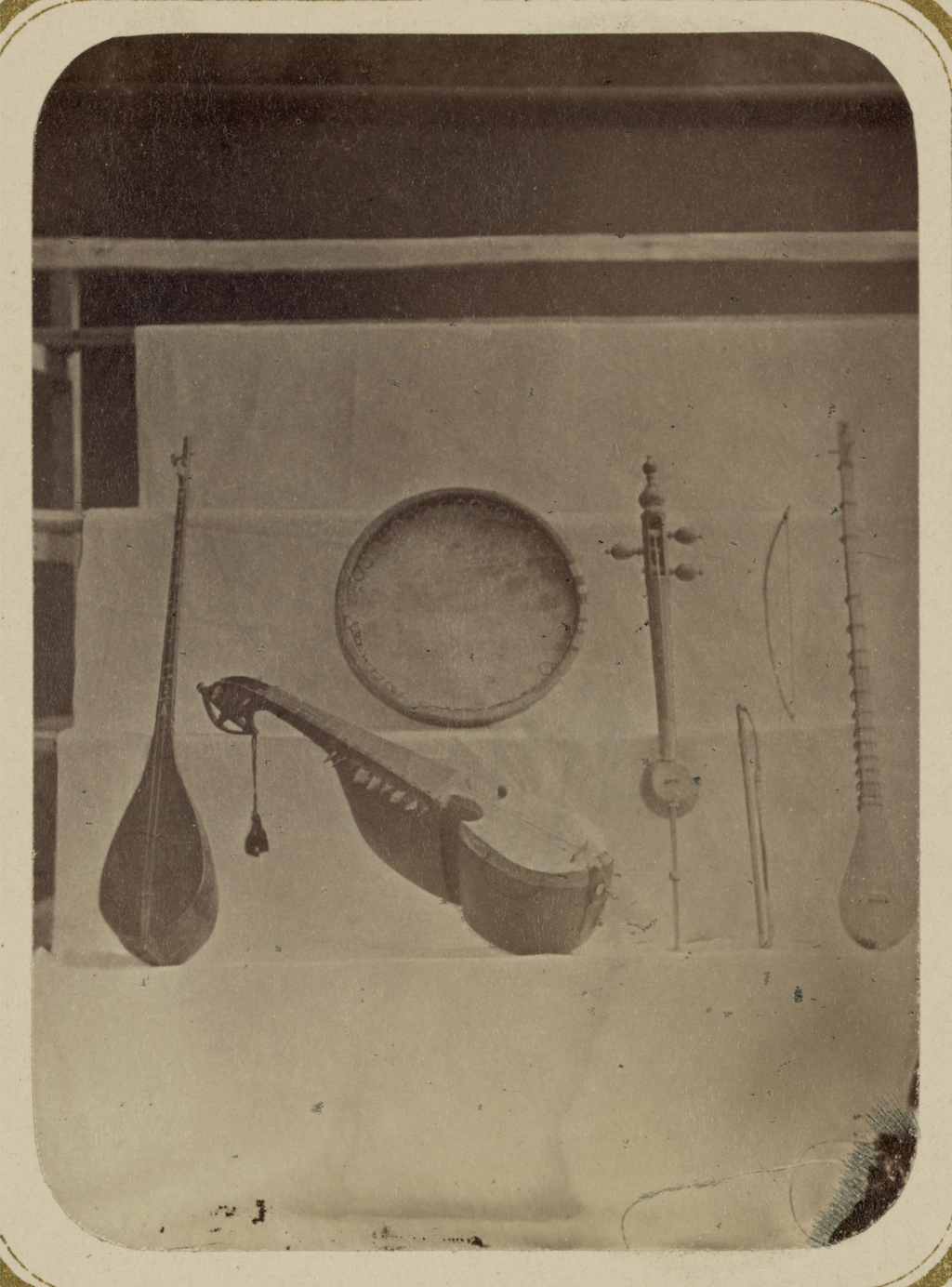
From left: dutar, rubab, daf (above rubab), gydzhak, mashki kamanche.

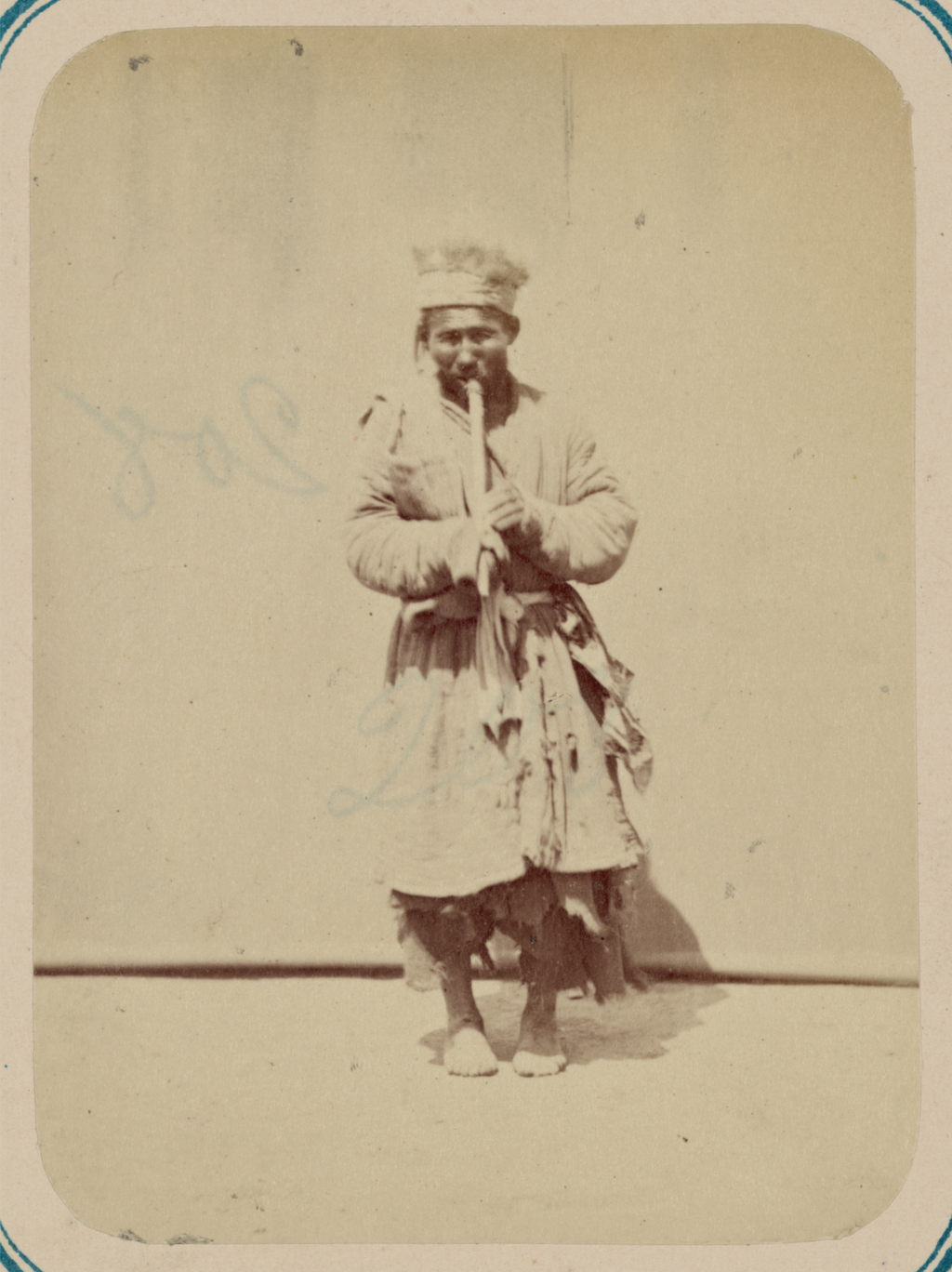
Ney, end-blown flute

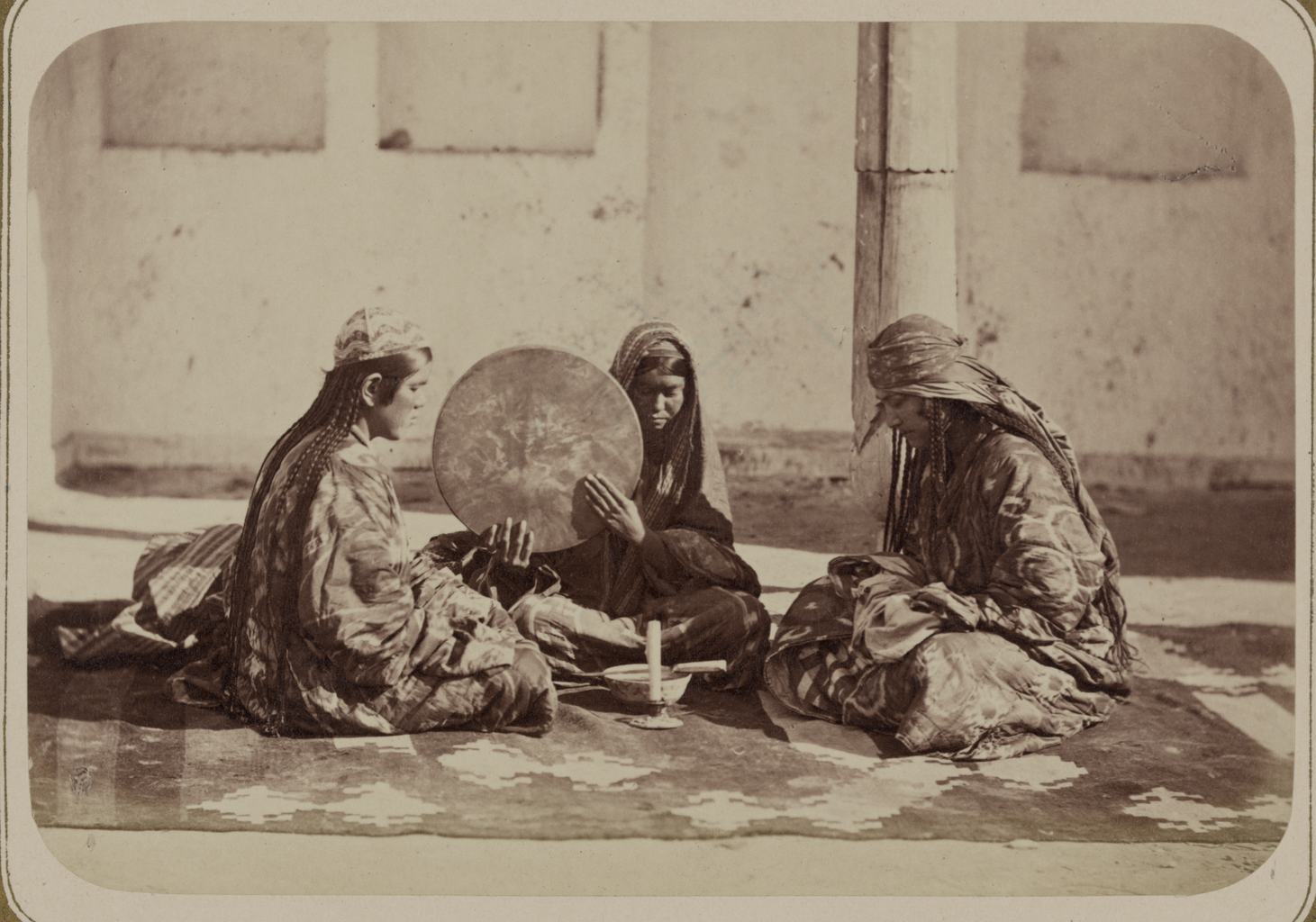
Tajik women, "fortune telling", one with a daf

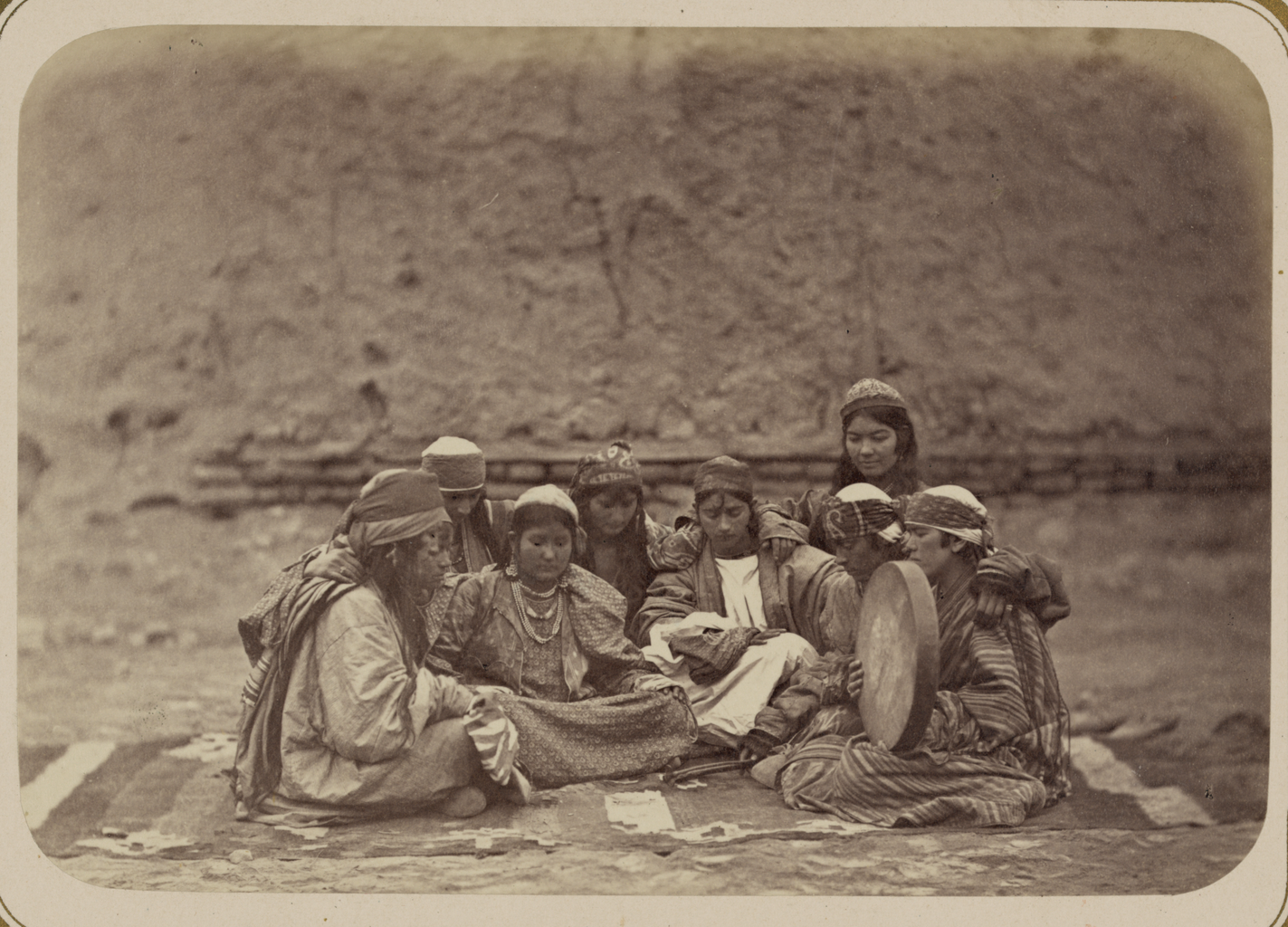
Tajik women, one daf

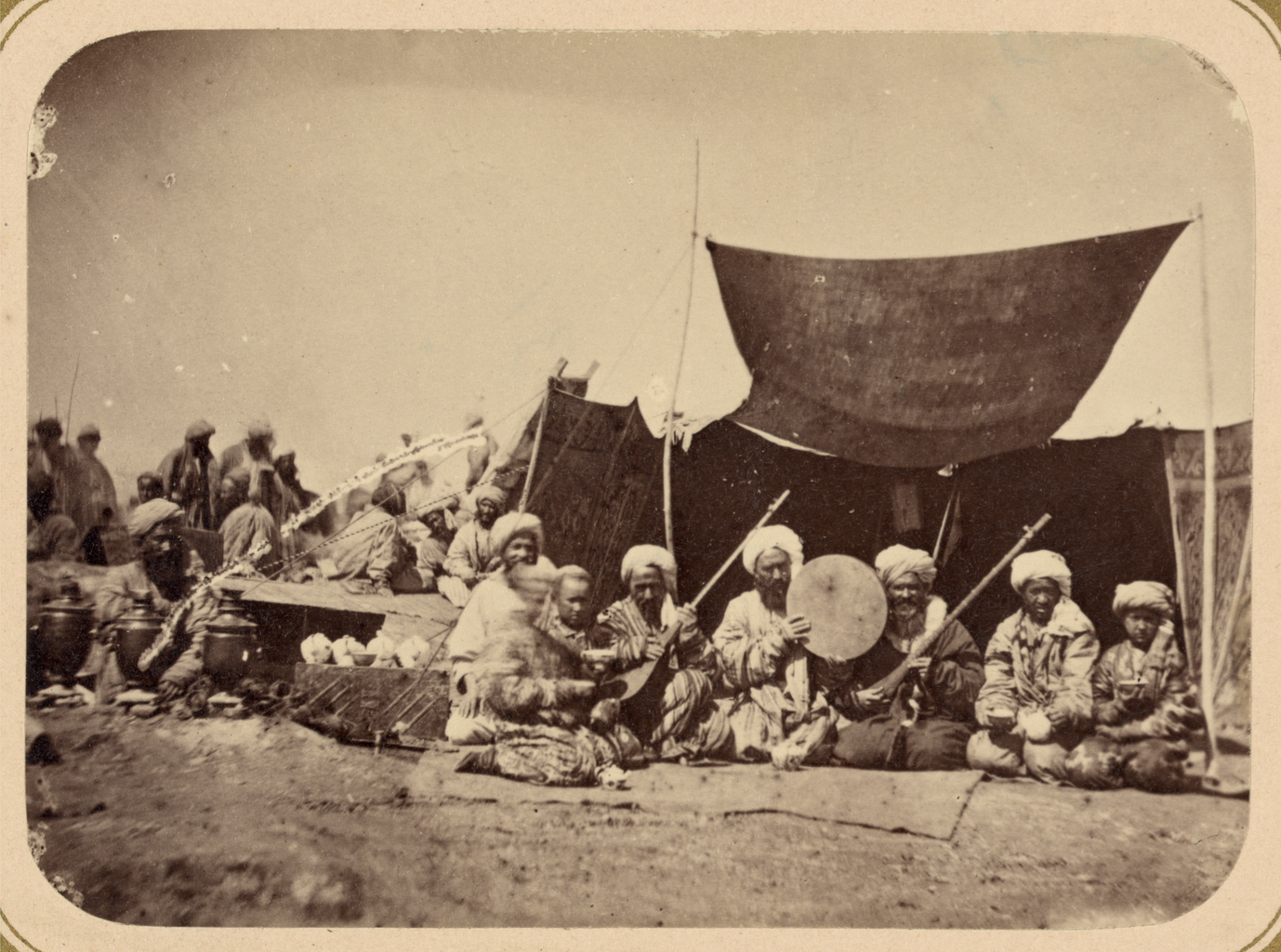

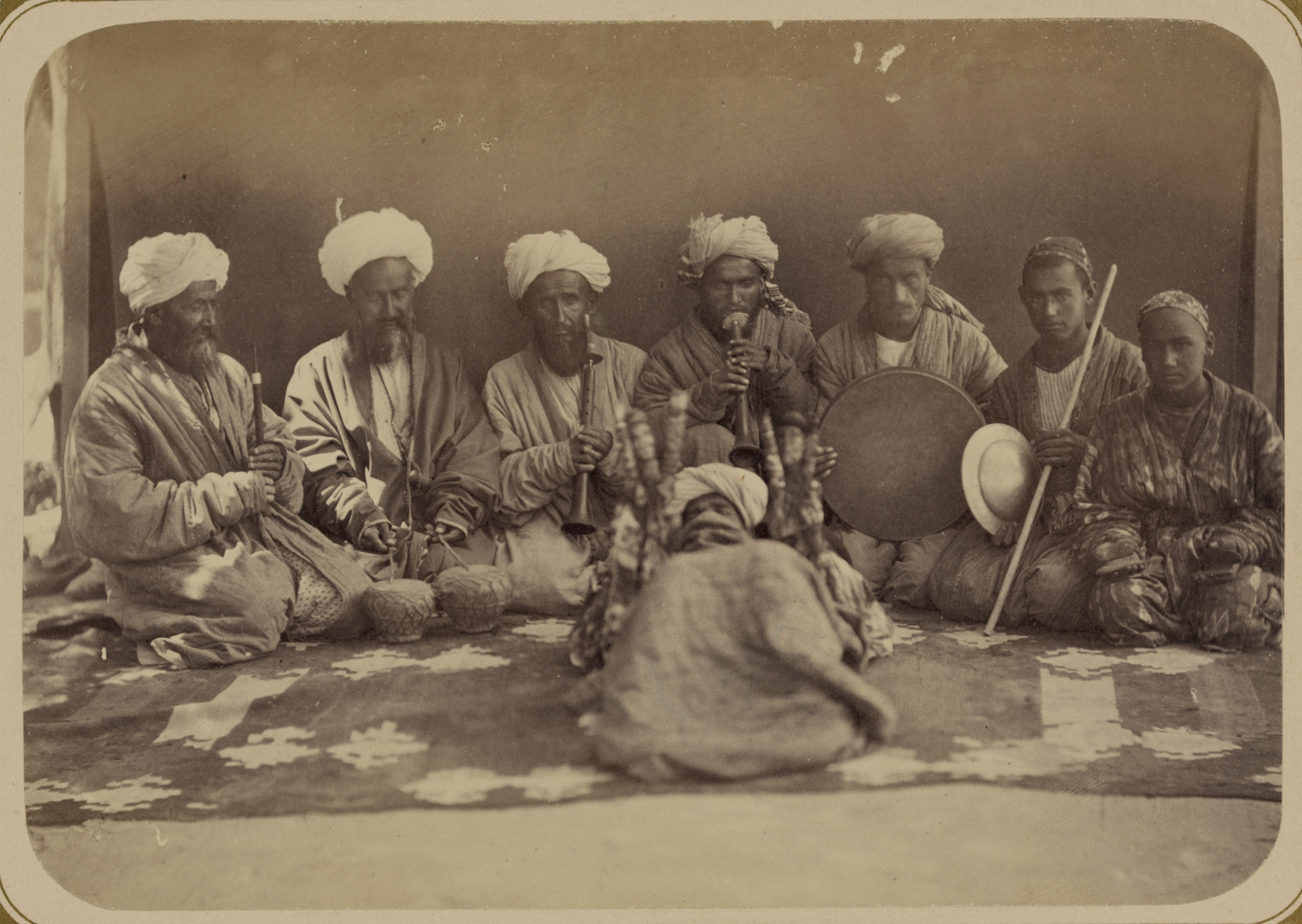
From left: bülban, nagaras, sorna, sorna, daf, tas, qairaqs.

== Others ==
The electronic keyboard is a popular western instrument.

There are numerous native musical instruments used in folk music.

== See also ==
- Music of Iran
- Persian traditional music
