= Coors =

Coors may refer to:

== Companies ==
- Coors Brewing Company, part of the Molson Coors Beverage Company
- Adolph Coors Company, a former holding company controlled by the heirs of founder Adolph Coors
- Coors Brewers, the UK arm of the Coors Brewing Company
- CoorsTek, and its precursors Coors Porcelain and Coors Ceramics, a privately owned manufacturer of industrial products
- MillerCoors, a joint venture between SABMiller and Molson Coors Brewing Company

== People ==
- Adolph Coors (formerly "Kuhrs", 1847–1929), founded Coors Brewing Company in 1873
- Adolph Coors II (1884–1970), son of Adolph Coors, second chairman of the Coors Brewing Company
- Adolph Coors III (1916–1960), grandson of Adolph Coors, was kidnapped and murdered
- Coors Light Twins, models and actresses
- Herman Frederik Coors, son of Adolph Coors, founded the H.F. Coors China Company in 1925 and owned the Herman Coors House
- Joseph Coors (1917–2003), grandson of Adolph Coors
- Pete Coors (born 1946), great-grandson of Adolph Coors, chairman of the Molson Coors Brewing Company
- William Coors (1916–2018), grandson of Adolph Coors, former president and chairman of the Coors Brewing Company
- Holly Coors (1920–2009), American conservative political activist and philanthropist
- D. Stanley Coors (1889–1960), bishop of the Methodist Church

== Places ==
- Coors Amphitheatre (Greenwood Village, Colorado), former name of an amphitheatre in Denver
- Coors Events Center, an arena in Boulder
- Coors Field, a baseball field in Denver
- Coors Visitor Centre, former name of a museum in Burton upon Trent, UK

== Sports ==
- Coors 200 (disambiguation), car races
- Coors Light 300, a NASCAR stock car race held in South Boston, Virginia
- Coors 420, a NASCAR stock car race held in Nashville
- Coors Classic, a bicycle race
- Coors Light Cash Spiel, a curling tournament held in Duluth

== Other uses ==
- Coors Boulevard, a highway in New Mexico
- Coors Cutter, a beer brand
- Coors Light, a beer brand
- Coors Light Pole Award, a NASCAR racing award

== See also ==
- Lattie F. Coor (born 1936), former President of Arizona State University and the University of Vermont
- The Corrs, an Irish musical band
- Coors Amphitheatre (disambiguation)
- Coor (disambiguation)
- Cohrs, a surname
