= Corr =

Corr or CORR may refer to:

== People with the name ==
- Andrea Corr (born 1974), Irish musician
- Barry Corr (born 1985), Irish footballer
- Barry John Corr (born 1981), Scottish footballer
- Bill Corr, American government official
- Caroline Corr (born 1973), Irish musician
- Cathal Corr (born 1987), Australian rules footballer
- Edwin G. Corr (1934–2026), American diplomat
- Erin Corr (1793–1862), Irish engraver
- Isabelle Marie Françoise Corr (1807–1883), Belgian painter of Irish descent and sister of Erin Corr
- Frank J. Corr (1877–1934), American politician
- Ida Corr (born 1977), Danish musician
- Jim Corr (born 1964), Irish musician
- Jim Corr (politician) (1934–2026), Irish politician
- Karen Corr (born 1969), Irish pool player
- Kieran Corr (born 2005), American football player
- Liam Corr (born 1990), Scottish footballer
- Nick Corr, Australian record executive
- Pat Corr (1927–2017), Northern Irish footballer
- Peter Corr (1923–2001), Irish footballer
- Ryan Corr (born 1989), Australian actor
- Sharon Corr (born 1970), Irish musician
- Tom Corr (born 1962), Irish boxer

== Places in Ireland ==
- Corr, Ballymorin, a townland in the civil parish of Ballymorin
- Cor, Templeport, a townland of County Cavan
- Corr, County Galway, a townland of County Galway
- Corr, County Tyrone, a townland of County Tyrone
- Corr, Kilkenny West, a townland in the civil parish of Kilkenny West

== Other uses ==
- Championship Off-Road Racing, American organization (1998–2008)
- Clinical Orthopaedics and Related Research, an American medical journal established in 1953
- Computing Research Repository (CoRR), the computer science section of the arXiv preprint repository
- CoRR hypothesis (co-location for redox regulation) in cell biology
- Correlation, written as $\mathrm{corr}(X,Y)=\rho_{X,Y}$ in mathematics
- The Corrs, an Irish music band

== See also ==
- Coor (disambiguation)
