= Koor =

Koor may refer to:

- Koor, Indonesia, a village in West Papua, Indonesia
- Koor, Rajasthan, a village in India
- KOOR, an American radio station
- Camel bell, also known as koor, a bell placed on camels

== See also ==
- Coor (disambiguation)
- Koore (disambiguation)
- Kur (disambiguation)
