= Kur (disambiguation) =

Kur is the name of the ancient Sumerian Underworld.

Kur, KUR or kur may also refer to:

== Places ==
- Kur, East Azerbaijan, a village in Iran
- Kur, Iran, a village in Hormozgan Province
- Kur, Kaleybar, a village in East Azerbaijan Province, Iran
- Kur, Rajasthan, a village in Jodhpur District, India
- Kur, Tulkarm, a Palestinian village
- Kur Island, an island of Indonesia
- Kuril Islands, name derived from "kur"

== Other uses ==
- Kur (cuneiform)
- Kur (surname)
- Kur, a hypothetical reconstruction of the name of the name of Yujiulü Mugulü, 4th century leader of the Rouran Khaganate
- Kur, species in Gor novels by John Norman
- Musical kur, a form of dressage
- Kur language
- Kurdish language, ISO 639 code

== See also ==
- Kür, village and municipality in Azerbaijan
- Kur River (disambiguation), several rivers
- Cur, a word for a mongrel dog
