= Cohrs =

Cohrs is the name of various persons

- Benjamin-Gunnar Cohrs (born 1965), German conductor, scholar, and publicist
- Eberhard Cohrs (1921–1999), German comedian
- Michael Cohrs (born 1956), American financier
- Peter Georg Cohrs, German politician

== See also ==
- Coors (disambiguation)
