= Kowr =

Kowr (Persian: كور) may refer to:

- Kowr-e Pain, East Azerbaijan Province

== See also ==
- Kur, Iran
