= Kur River =

The Kur River may refer to:

- Kur (Kursk Oblast), in the Dnieper basin, Russia
- Kur (Khabarovsk Krai), in the Amur basin, Russia
- Kura (Russia), in Stavropol Krai, Russia
- Kura (Caspian Sea) in Georgia and Azerbaijan (Georgian: მტკვარი - Mtkvari, Azerbaijani: Kür)

== See also ==
- Kur (disambiguation)
- Kor River in Iran
