= Krakeb =

Moroccan musical instrument

Qraqeb
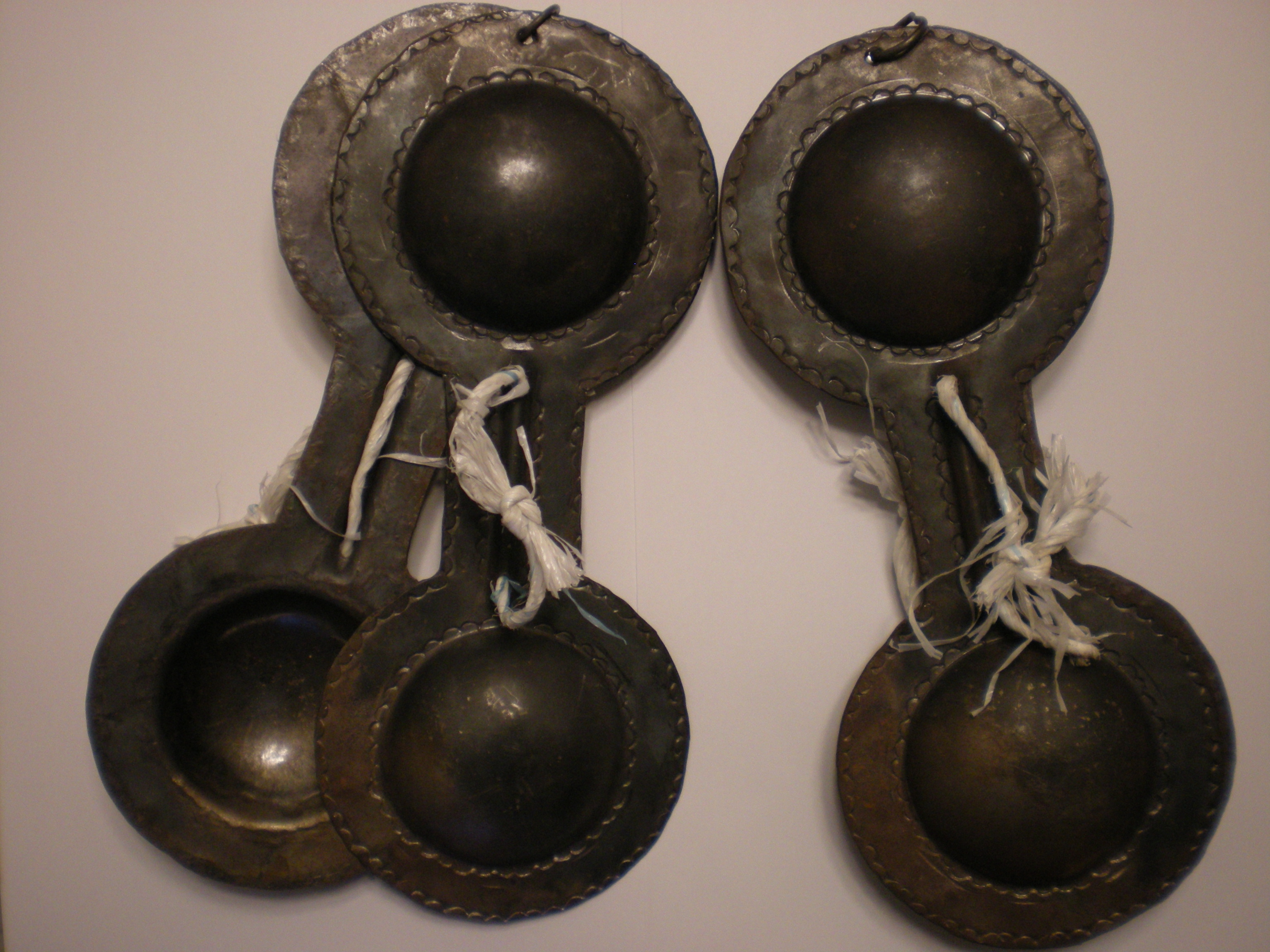
- Set of qraqeb
- Other names: Qraqeb, qaragib, garagab, nwaqess, shkashek, tsaqtsaqa, chakchaga, shaqshaqa
- Classification: Idiophone

Related instruments
- qairaq

Use of Qraqeb in a wedding in the city of Salé, Morocco - November 2025

Qraqeb or garagab or Qarqabate (Arabic: قراقب), in English often transliterated as krakeb, is an iron castanet-like musical instrument primarily used as the rhythmic aspect of Gnawa music. Gnawa today is part of the North African culture and is inherent in the Maghrebi soundscape. The word qraqeb is a plural form (with the singular being qarqab), with an unclear etymology, as the word does not occur in Standard Arabic with this meaning.

== Cultural significance ==
Gnawa music is a spiritual music representing the history of sub-Saharan West African people who were sold as slaves in present-day Algeria, Morocco, Libya and Tunisia or Greater Maghreb. "...stories are told to those who are connected with their history by the very sound of the krakebs – they represent the sound of horses hooves hitting the ground as their people were carried away in grain sacks, and the rattling of shackles that used to hold their people captive.". They are also said to represent shackles which slaves removed when they became free men. Several specific rhythms played by Gnawa musicians on Qarqabat (often accompanied by hajhuj or sintir) symbolise this freedom.

== Body ==
Krakeb are similar to large iron castanets in that they are handheld cymbal-type instruments which are handmade from iron or steel. They are idiophones, meaning that their sound comes from the vibration of the instrument's body. The body is four cymbals (two on each side) attached by a string. Since they are played with one hand, the musician usually holds one in each to play simultaneously.

== Playing ==
In the Gnawa style, krakeb stay closed between hits so that the instrument clanging shut is the most prominent sound. In Tunisia, they are hit and pulled back apart quickly so that the ringing of the instrument is the most prominent sound. Generally, there is one sintir (guimbri) and up to 20 krakeb players per Gnawa ensemble.
