= Zang (bell) =

Bells or finger cymbals used for rhythmic accompaniment

Zang (زنگ)
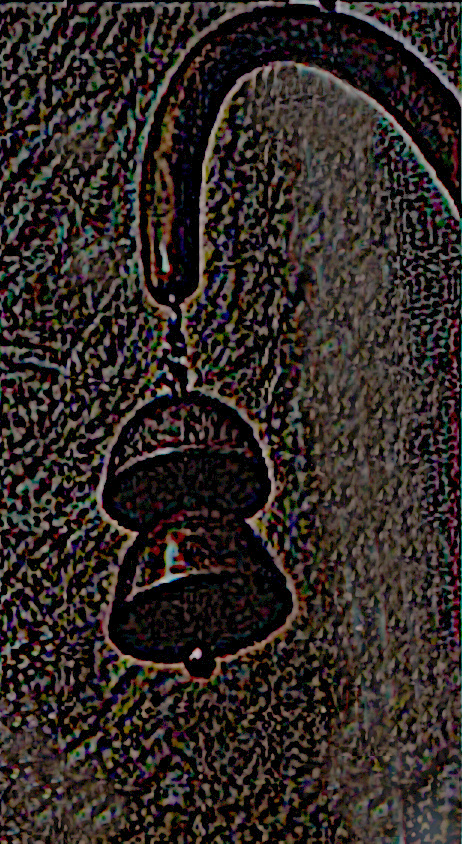
- Zang e zurkhaneh, bell used in ancient Persian gyms.

Percussion instrument
- Other names: jalājil (Arabic, جلجل); zang (Uyghur, Uzbek); zangak (Armenian) also čang and tschang; çan Turkish
- Classification: percussion, idiophones
- Hornbostel–Sachs classification: 111.242 (Idiophones primarily produce their sounds by means of the actual body of the instrument vibrating; Directly struck idiophones (111) The player executes the movement of striking; 111.2 Percussion idiophones – The instrument is struck either with a non-sonorous object (hand, stick, striker) or against a non-sonorous object (human body, the ground); 11.24 Percussion vessels; 111.242 Bells – The vibration is weakest near the vertex)
- Developed: Bells developed originally in China. They spread and also developed locally in other locations.

Zang (Persian: زنگ) means bell in Persian, for both large bells and small. The term has historically been applied to a number of ringing metal musical instruments, including large bells with clappers worn by elephants, smaller 3-9 inch bells worn on camels, horses, donkeys and cattle, 2-3 inch sheep bells, and tiny bells tied to the legs of hawks. It also applies to clusters of small bells worn by musicians and dancers, sewn onto cloth bracelets and anklets, or laced on a long string to be wrapped around the waist or hung as a necklace.

Additionally, the name in many forms has been applied to cymbals, especially small finger cymbals (Persian: sanj angshati سنج انگشتی) used by dancers, known worldwide today as zills, but also to some larger cymbals including the Iranian sanj or Iraqi zanj.

That cymbals and bells have been differentiated in Persian can be seen in the Shahnameh which refers to both instruments together:

His elephant-attendants' crowns of gold,
Their golden girdles and their golden torques,
Their golden Sanj (cymbals) and their golden Zang (bells)...
--Ferdowsky, Shahnameh, text number 7.

== Origin of bells, Near East and Central Asia ==
=== Near East ===
Cast metal bells may have first been made in China as early as 3000 B.C., as the angular harp originated in the Near East. Connections between the Near East and China by the 5th century B.C. is considered a fact now, given the discovery of horizontal angular harps in China.

In Mesopotamia, the first bells were made of clay, later ones of bronze or other metals and were decorated with symbolic signs. Bells in the 1st millennium B.C. usually had a meaning to ward off evil, which is why they were worn by priests on a cord around their necks.

Babylonian terracotta figures from the 2nd millennium B.C. have been found holding small pairs of cymbals in their hands, the originals of which were probably made of bronze. Such bronze basins from about 1200 B.C. were found in Syria and from the mid-ninth century B.C. were found in Egypt. From the 17th Egyptian dynasty (16th century B.C.) we know of professional musicians employed by mural paintings, such as the drummer Emhab, who has been handed down by name. Terracotta figurines with basins from Ancient Egypt are dated to the Greek period. Many of the bronze, silver and gold bells used in Egypt and the Middle East also date from this period.

The oldest bronze bells unearthed in Palestine come from Tel Megiddo dated to the 9th/8th century B.C. The bells with clapper are made of bronze, 2.5 to 6.5 centimeters high, roughly hemispherical in shape and have an eyelet for hanging. The numerous finds of bells in the Palestine area in the Greco-Roman period are somewhat smaller. Ever since they were mentioned in the Old Testament (in connection with pomegranates), the bells have had a magical protective function.

=== Central Asia ===
Zang-e schotor (زنگوله شتر), camel bells

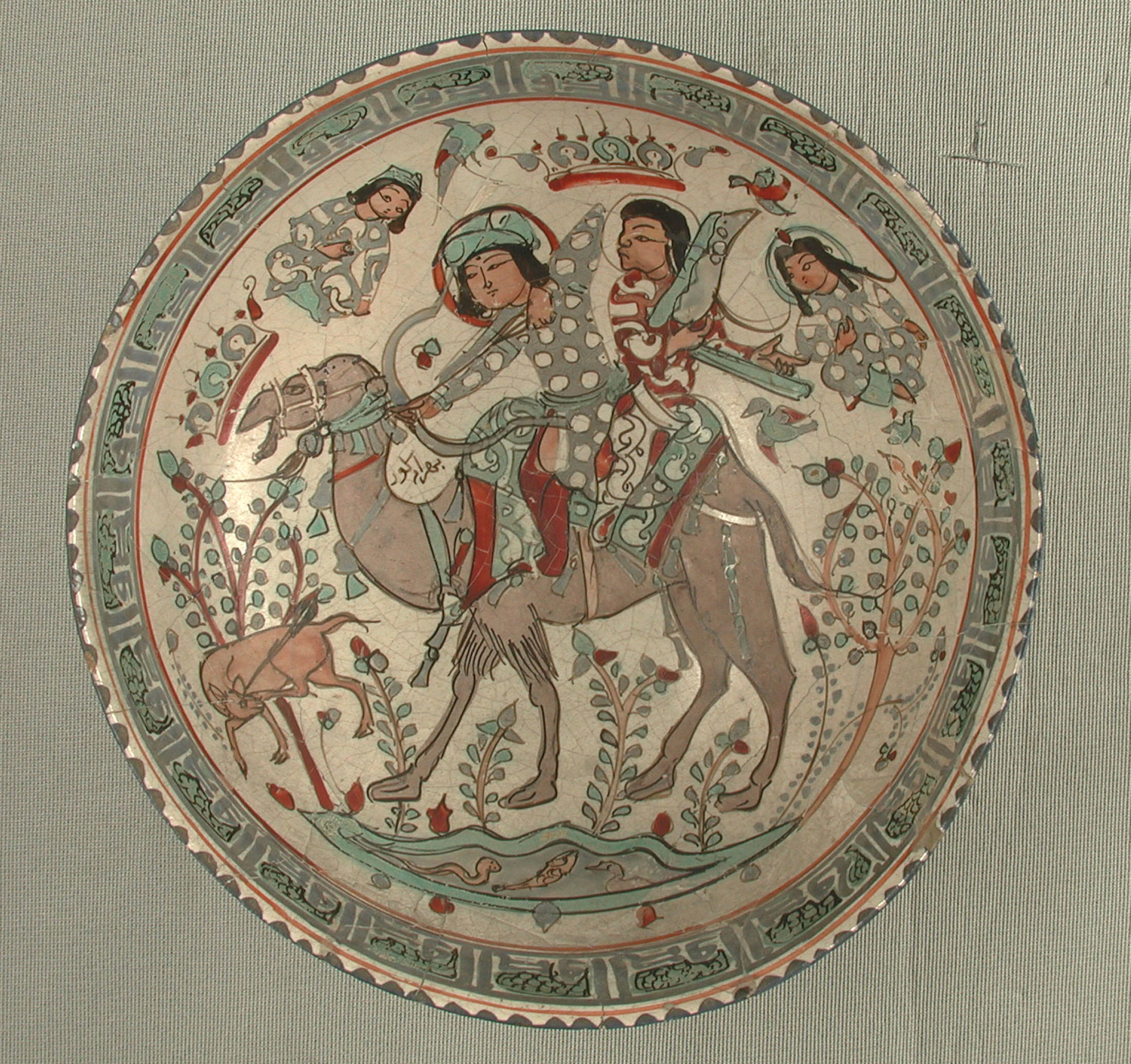
Camel with bell hung beneath its head, a tassell tied in the bell's bottom.

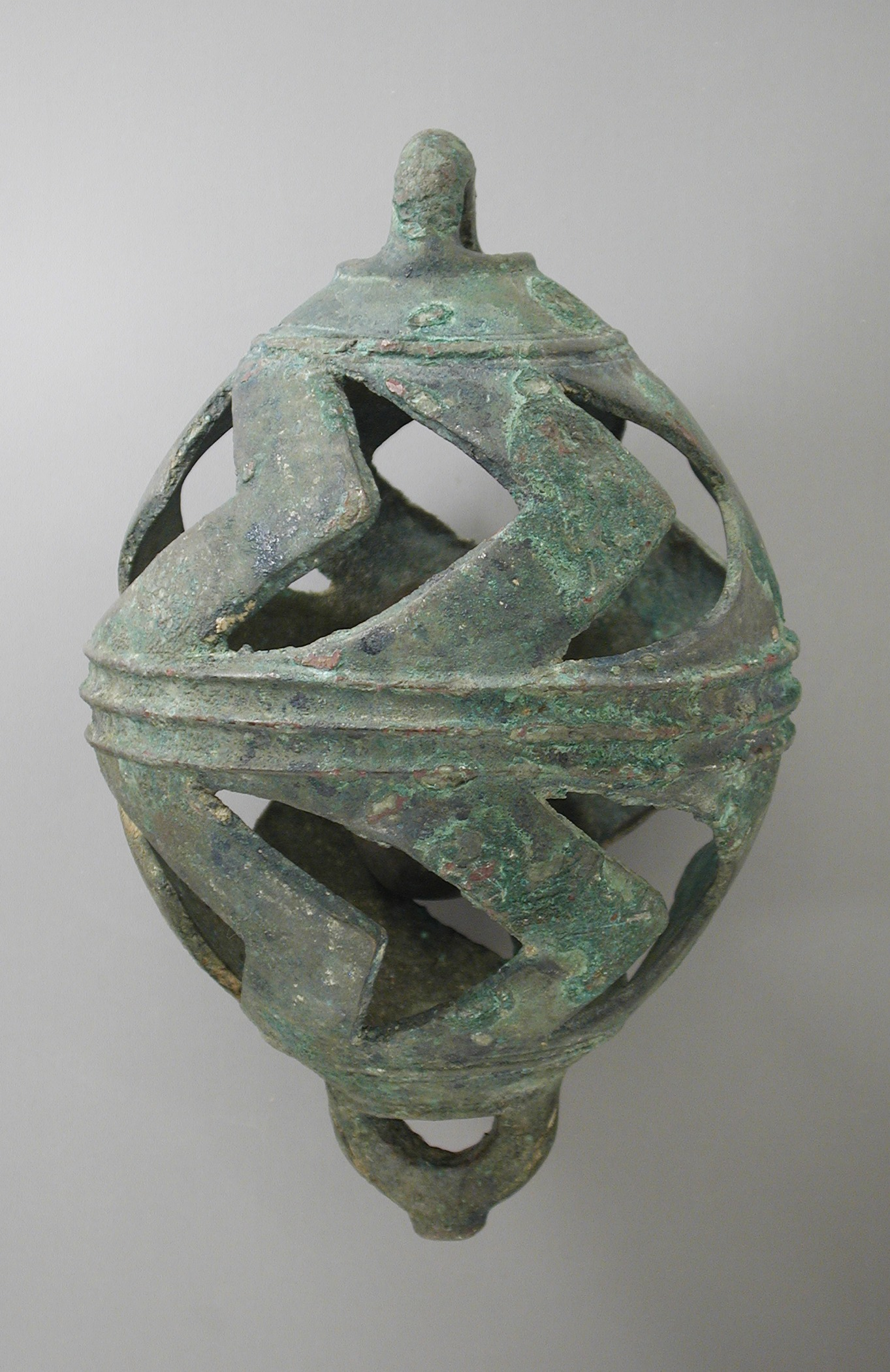
Western Iran, circa 1000-650 B.C. 4 1/2 x 7 1/4 inches. Similar to bell hung under camel's head.

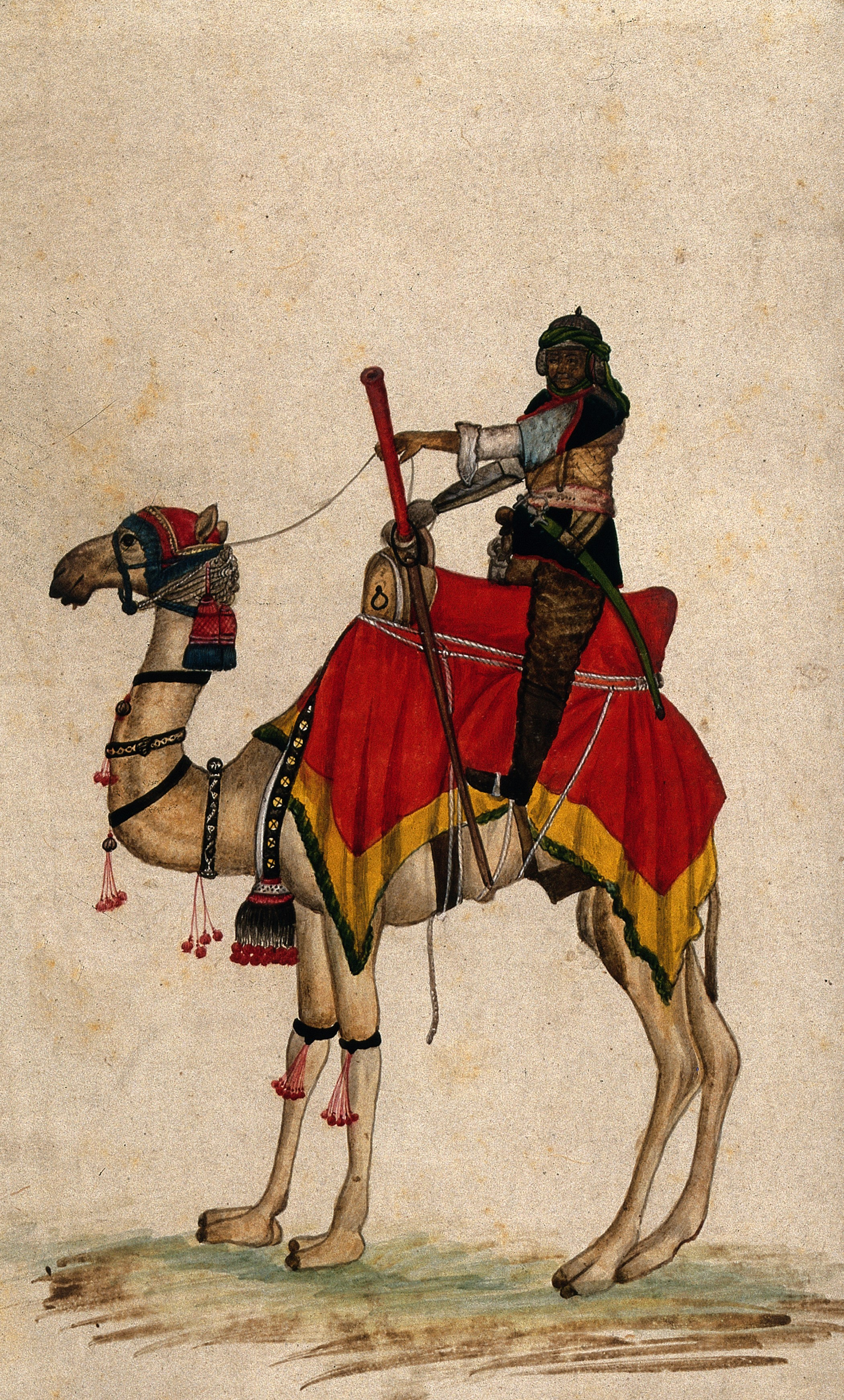
Camel with small bells hung in cluster on its neck.

Zang-e schotor, camel bells, larger bells, small bells, bells attached to cloth (as neck band or knee band), clusters of bells suspended from larger bells

Bronze bells, which were probably hung on horses, do not appear until the 12th century BC at the earliest in an area from the north of the Iranian highlands to the southern Caucasus. They probably belonged to nomad riders who traveled with pack horses. The horses of Assyrian rulers were from the 9th century BC. hung with several bells. By the 5th century B.C. individual bells hung on horses and camels throughout the Orient to the Balkans.

It was common for the Turkic peoples and Mongolians to use bells made of two differently shaped half-shells on the harness, so that the enclosed balls produced two tones. The sound of the bells of slowly walking camels gave a specific drum rhythm of classical Persian music the descriptive name zang-e schotor ("camel bells [rhythm]") in Persian.

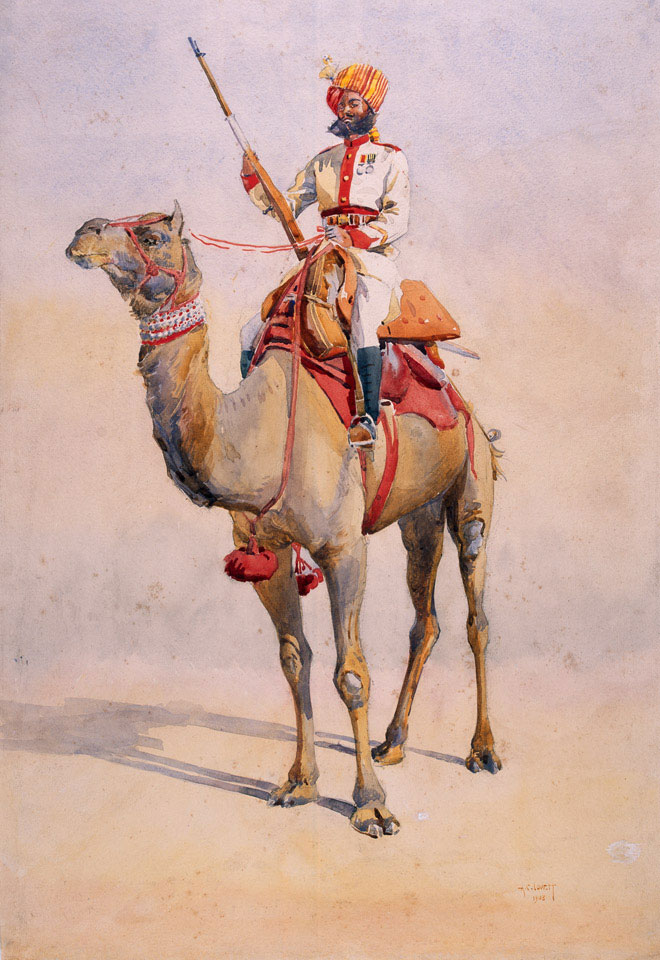
Small bells attached to cloth under camel's head, 1908, Bikaner Camel Corps

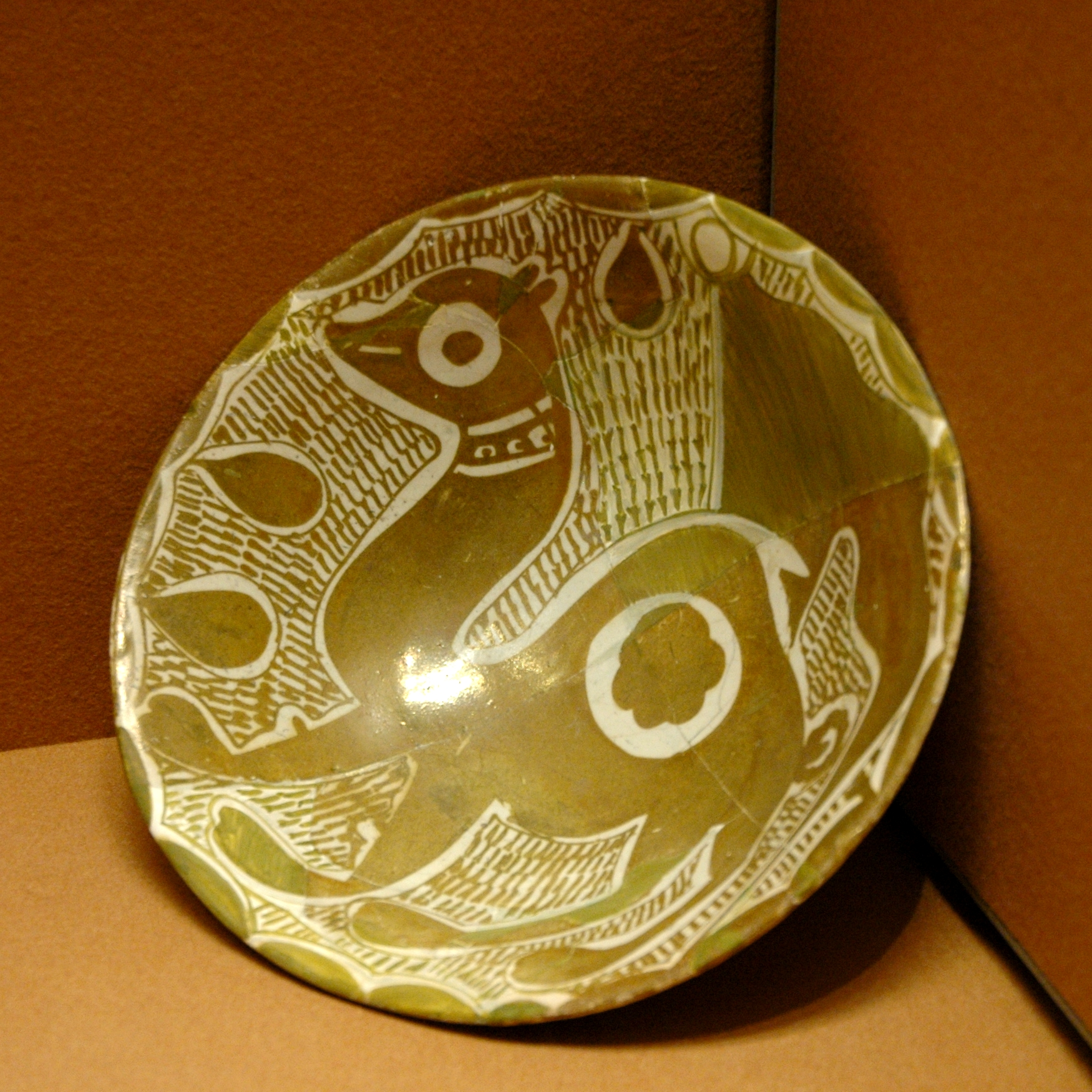
Bell on strip around camel's neck, 10th century A.D.

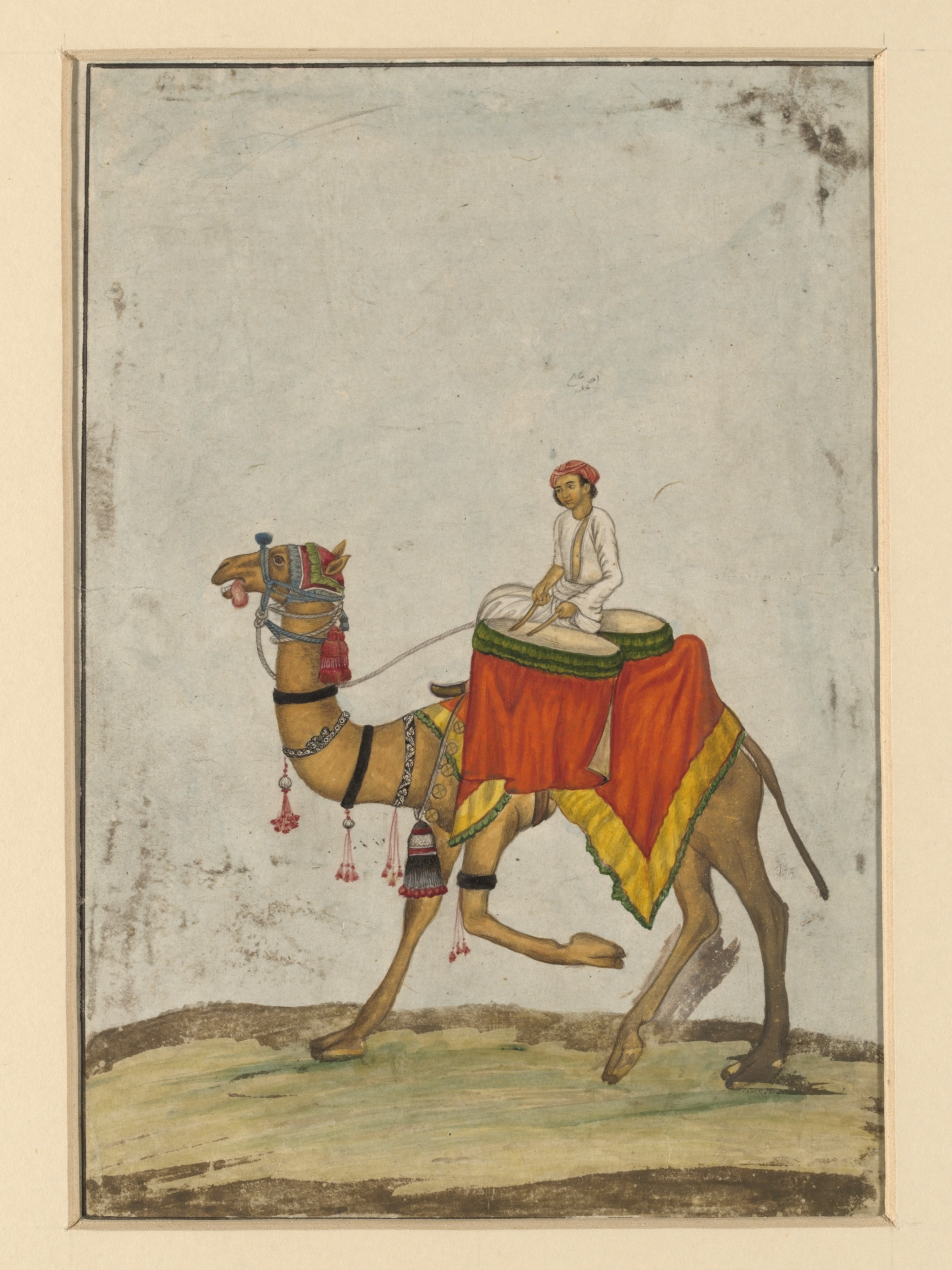
In addition to kös kettle drums, the camel has bells on its neck, with smaller bells dangling from them.

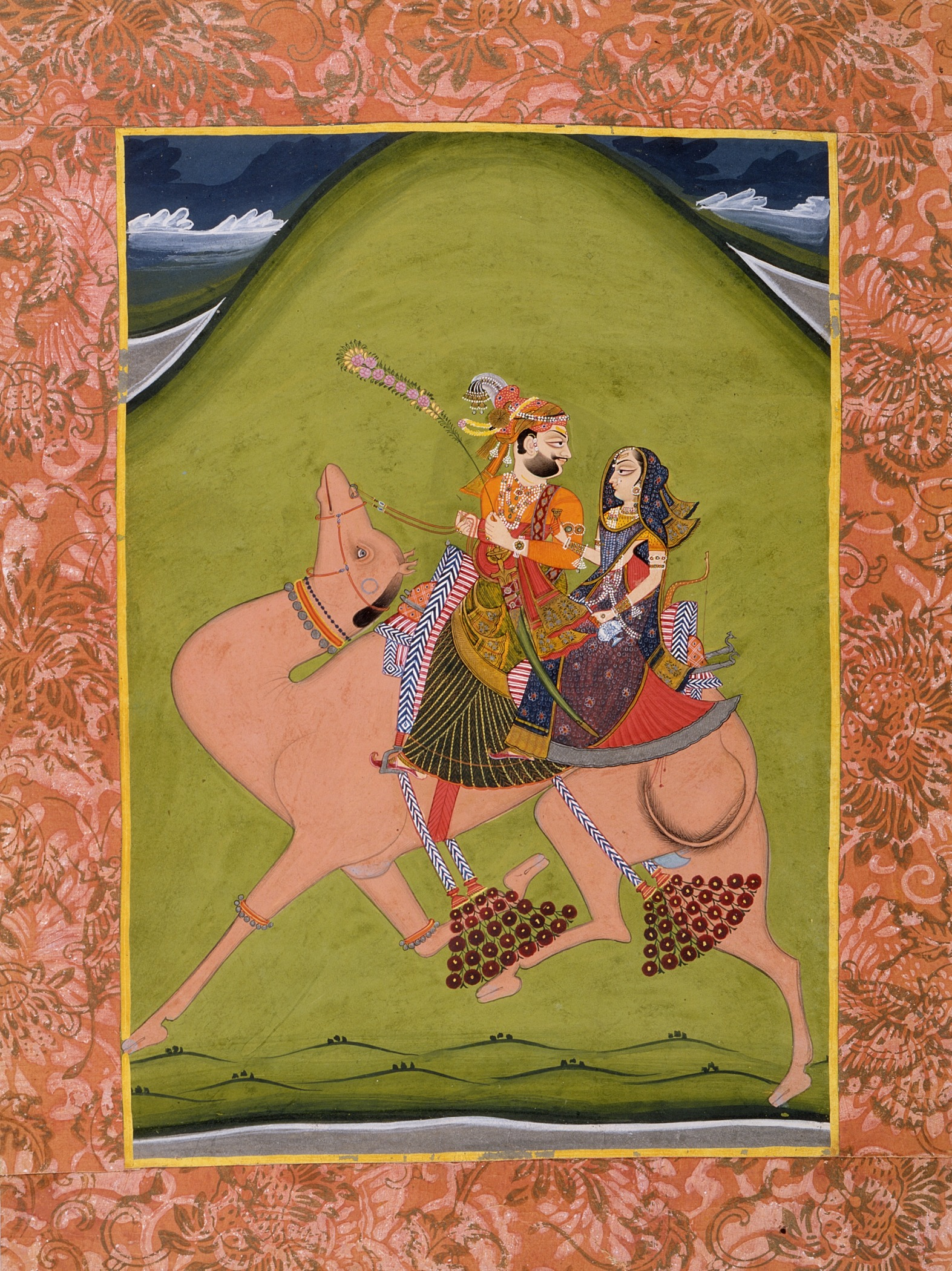
Romantic use of camel bells. Camel bells around the camel's neck and knees.

Camel bells on Sadler bands.

The places where bells were used in southern Central Asia the beginning of the 1st millennium B.C., includes the urban settlement of Bactra (Balch). In addition to many pottery items, bells from the 1st millennium B.C. were also found in the cemeteries. Bronze bells are known from the Sasanian Empire (224-651). From two cemeteries laid out between the 7th and 9th centuries A.D. in the Siberian region of Khabarov (Nadezhdinskoje and Korsakova) come bronze bells with a clapper, which were probably attached to a belt. Bells and other metal attachments on the belt have been part of the clothing of the nomads in the Asian steppes since the 7th century. To this day they have been preserved as part of the shaman's costume. Bells and shackles sewn onto clothing or shoes to ward off evil spirits or the evil eye have been unearthed in many areas of Siberia and Central Asia. Spherical bells with a slit from Sogdian and Bactrian graves of the 7th/8th centuries also had this function.

Bells discovered in Western Iran
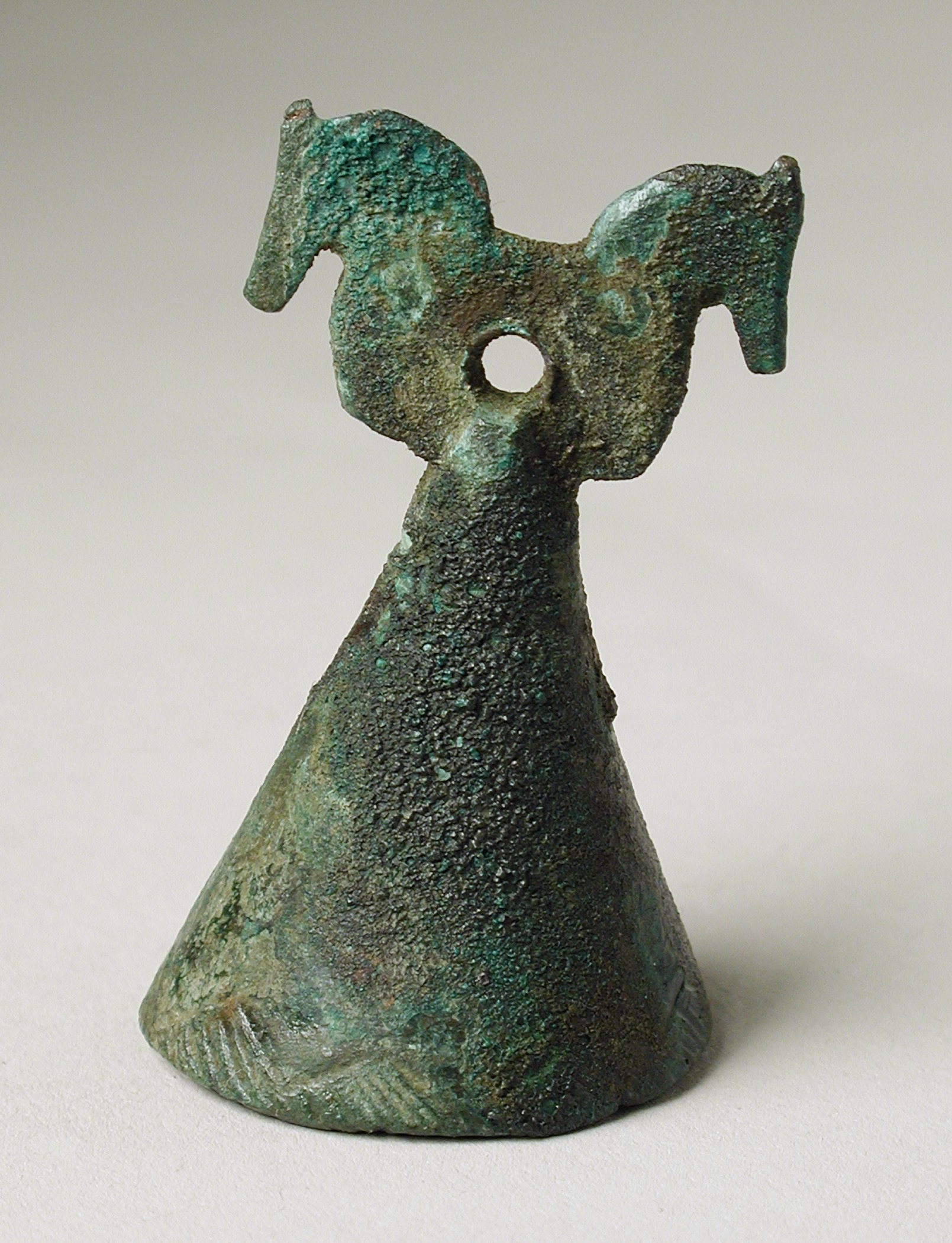
Western Iran, circa 150 B.C. - 224 A.D. Hammered bronze bell, 1.5 inches tall. Bell hung on horse tack or bridle?

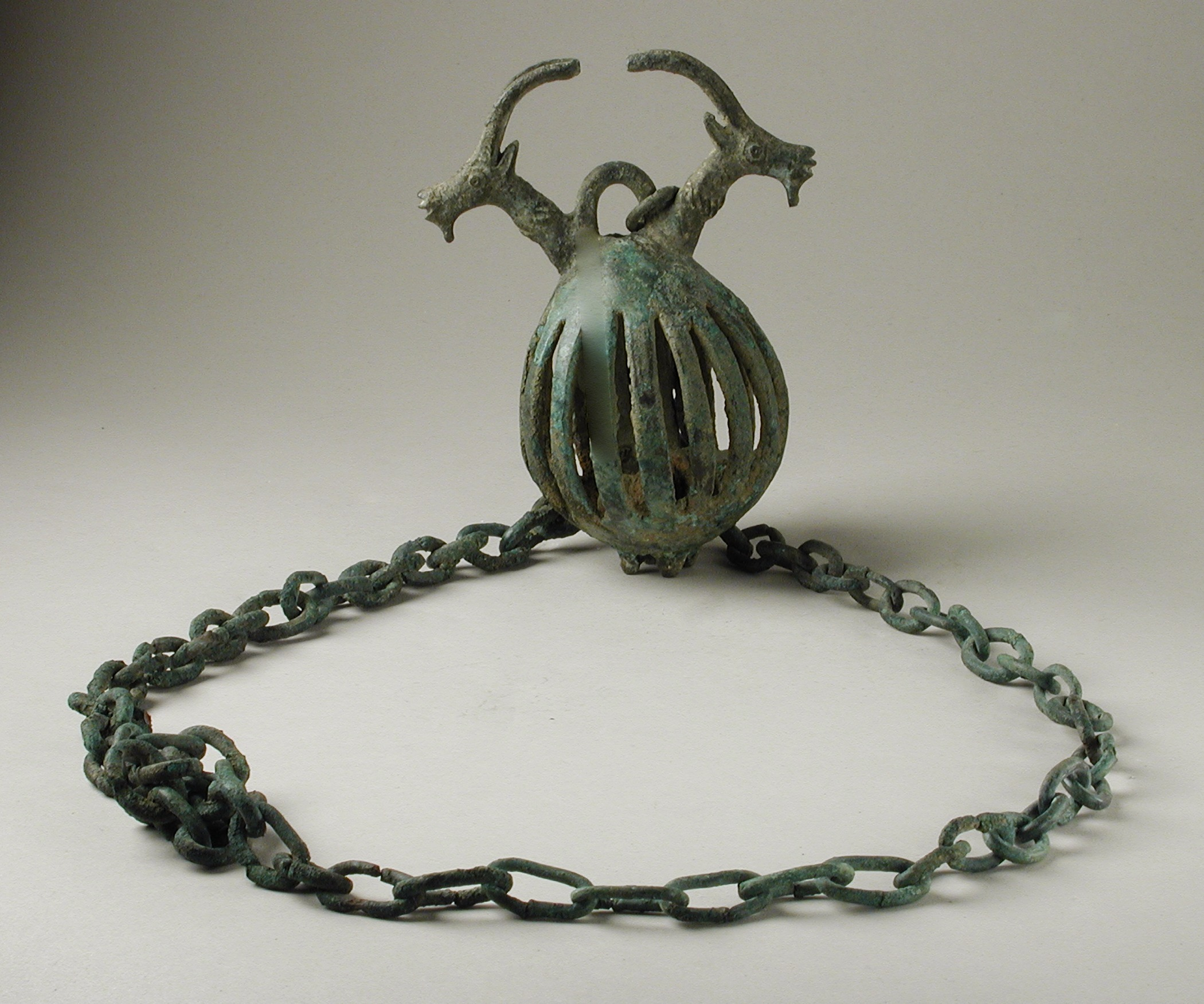
Western Iran, circa 1000-650 B.C. Cast bronze bell, 5 1/2 x2 inches. Hung on herd animal?

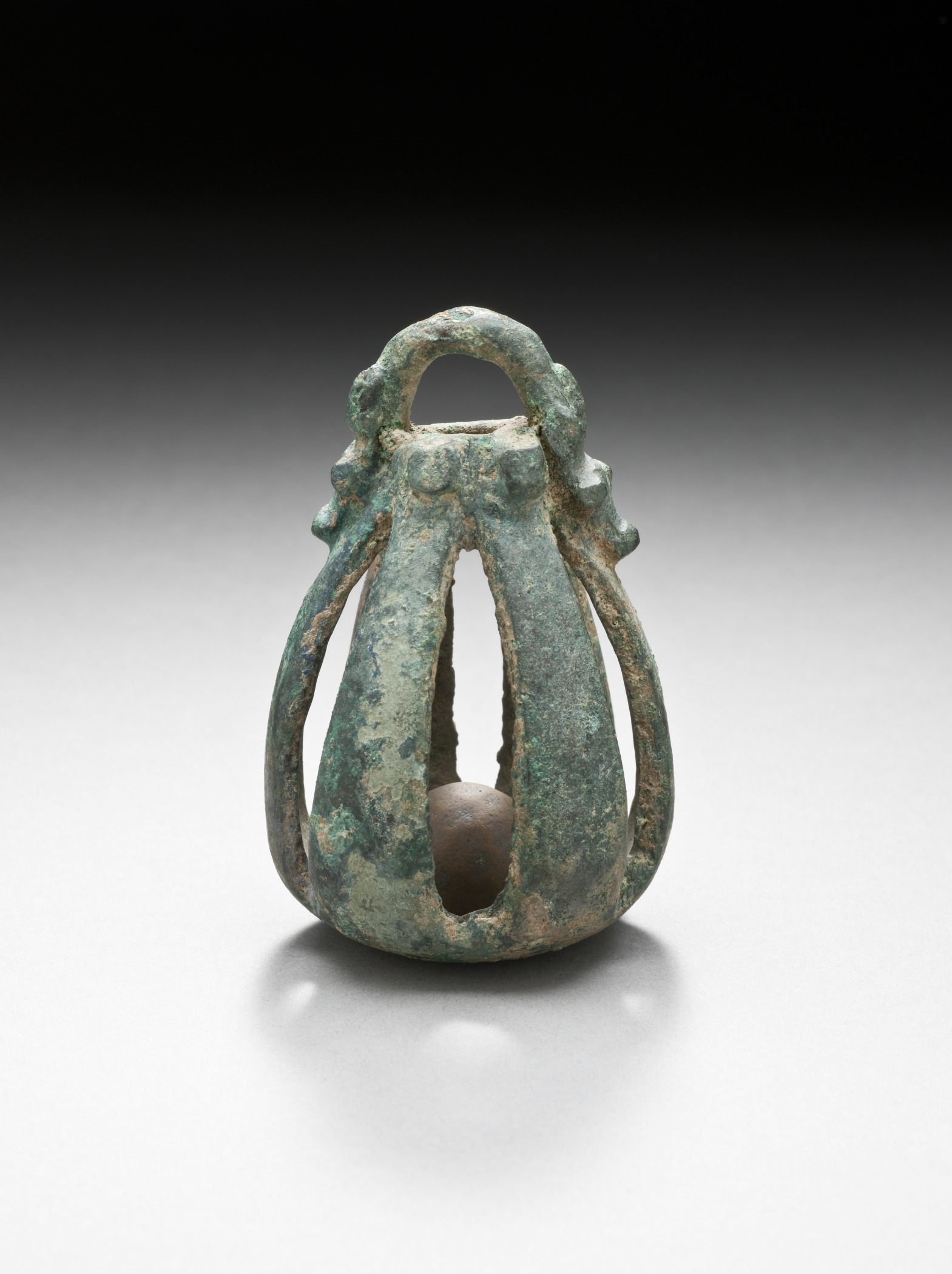
Western Iran, circa 1000-650 B.C. Bronze bell, 2 5/8 x 1 5/8 inches.

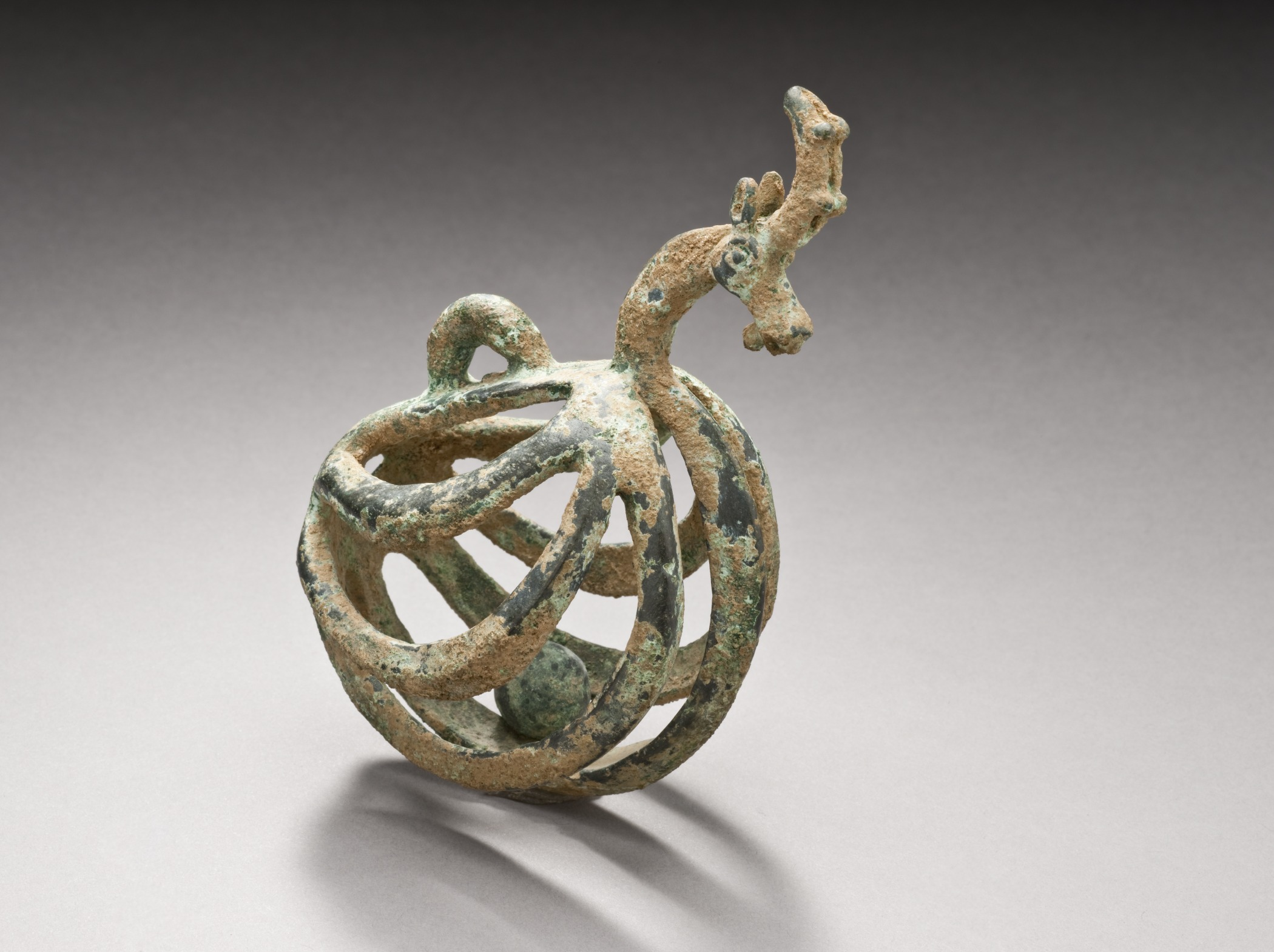
Western Iran, circa 1000-650 B.C. Bronze bell, 3 x 4 1/4 inches. Bell for goat?

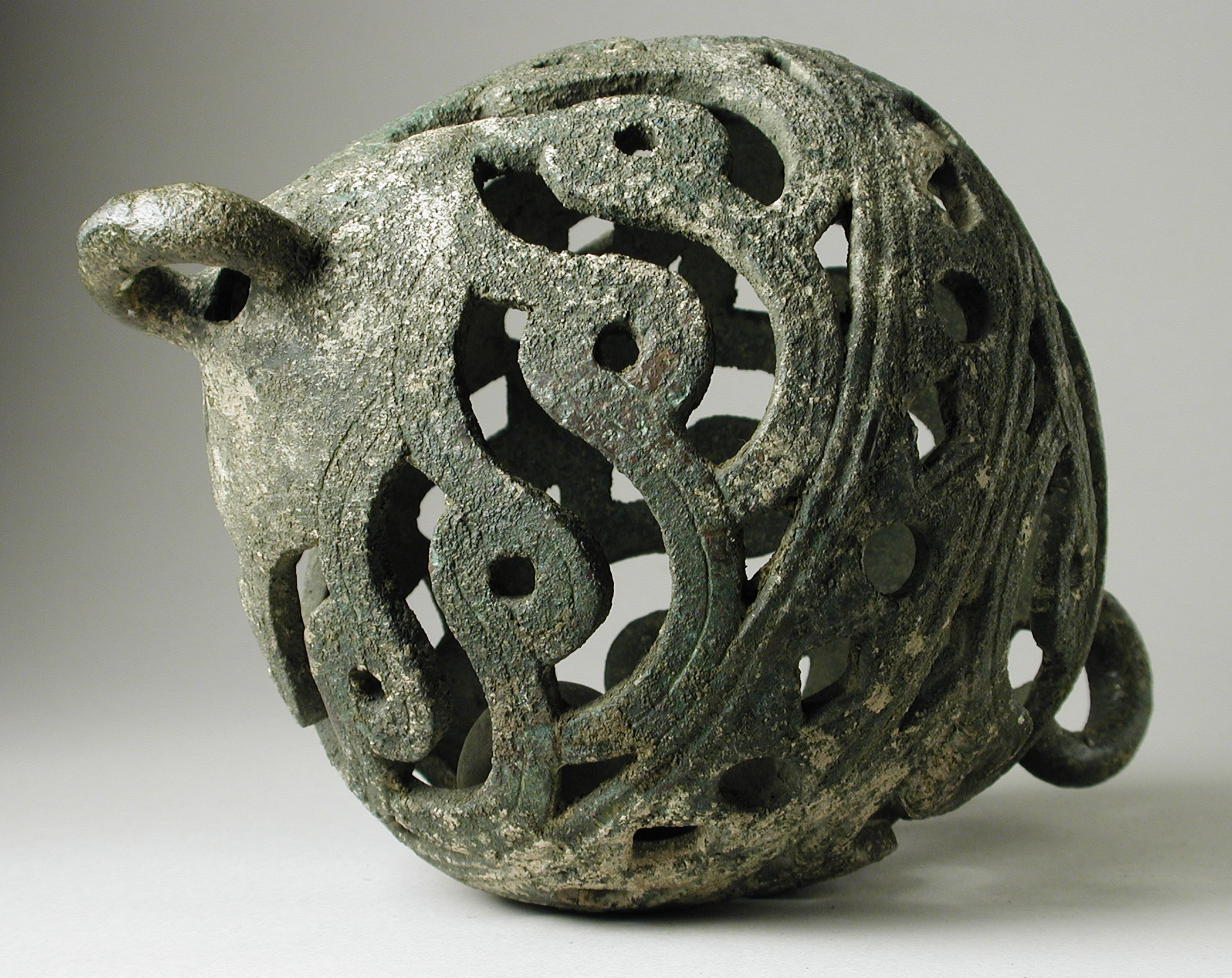
Western Iran, circa 1000-650 B.C. Cast bronze bell, 5 3/4 x 8 1/4 inches. Camel bell?

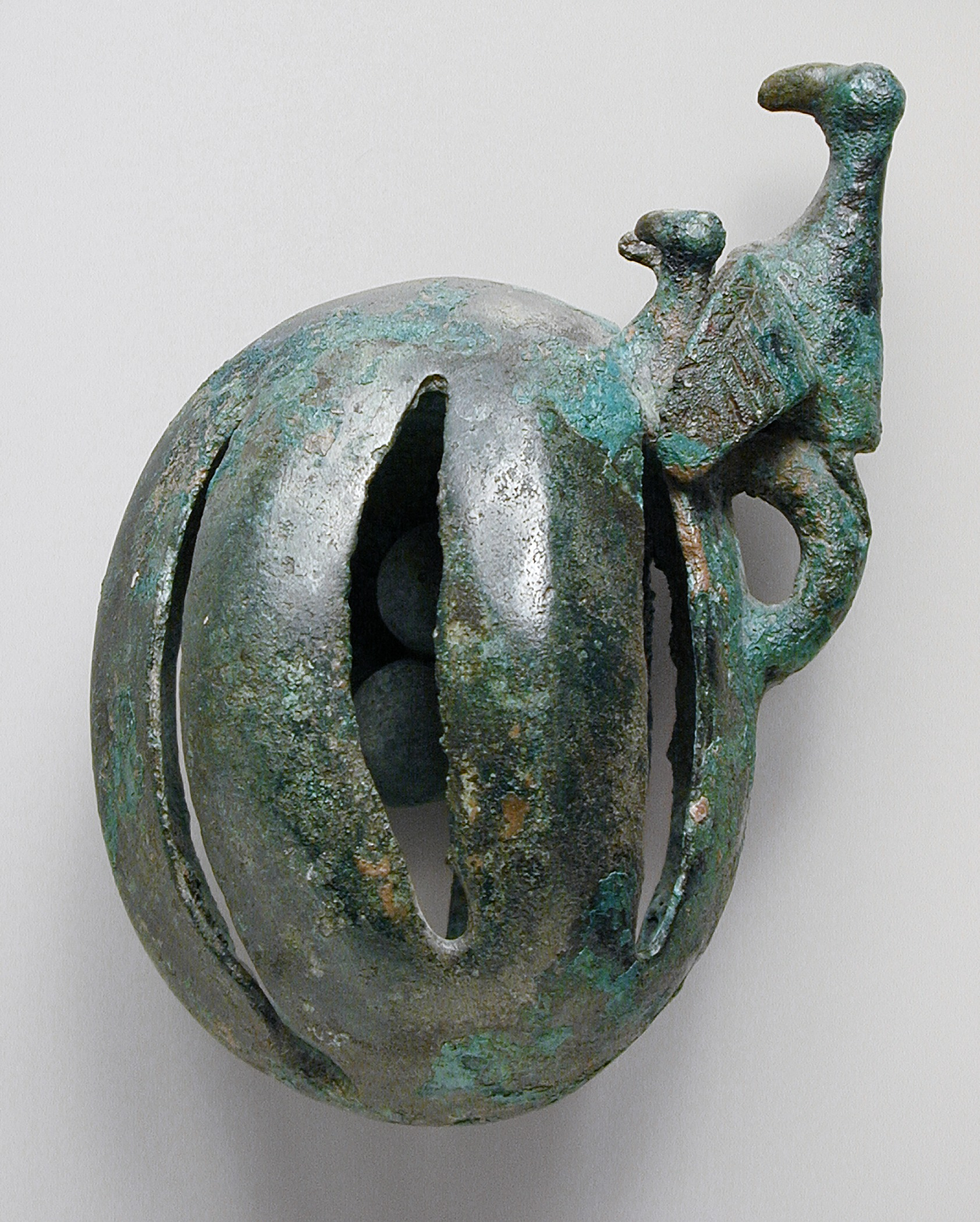
Western Iran, circa 1000-650 B.C. Bronze, cast bell, 2 3/8 x 3 7/8 inches.

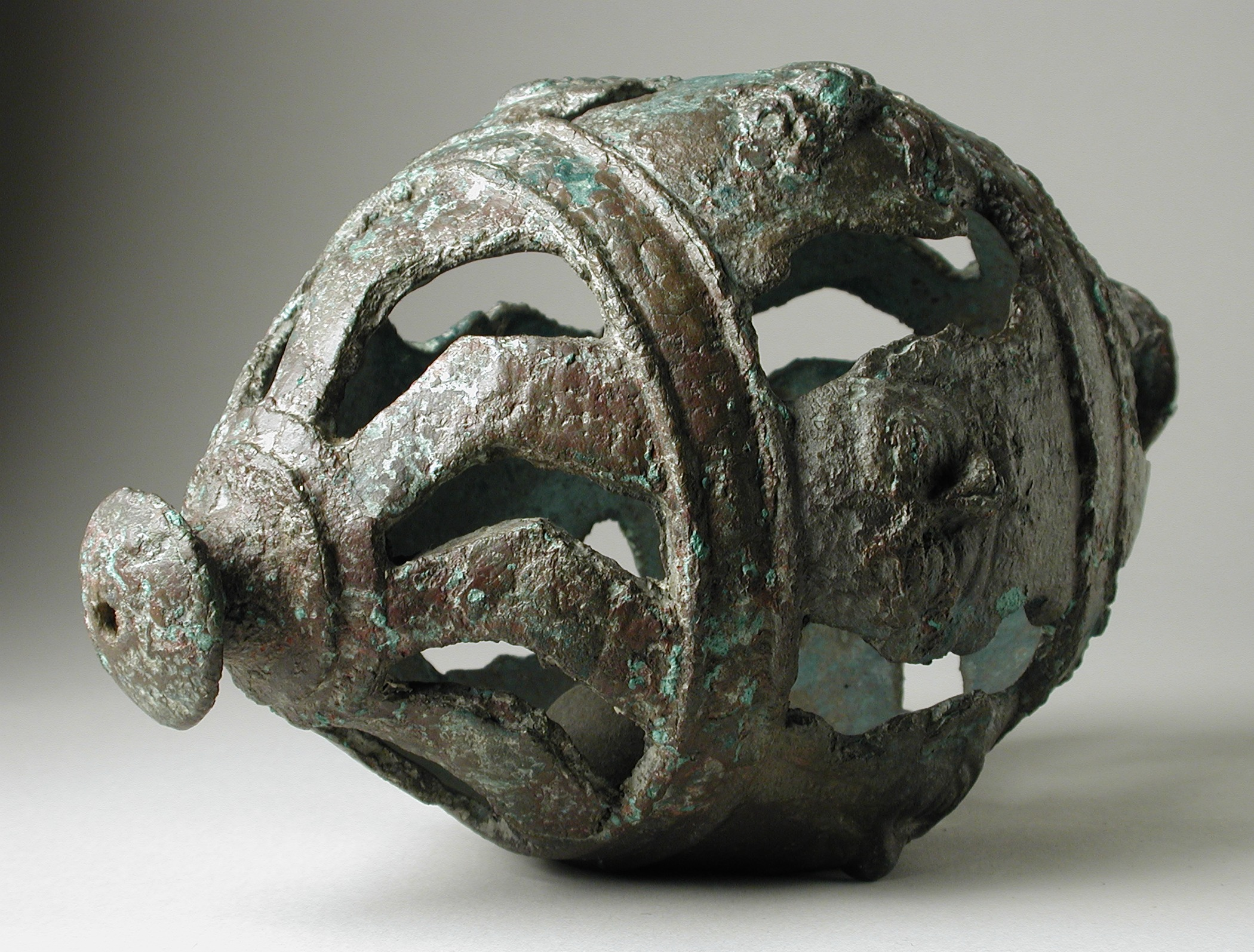
Western Iran, circa 1000-650 B.C., 8 1/2 x 5 3/4 inches

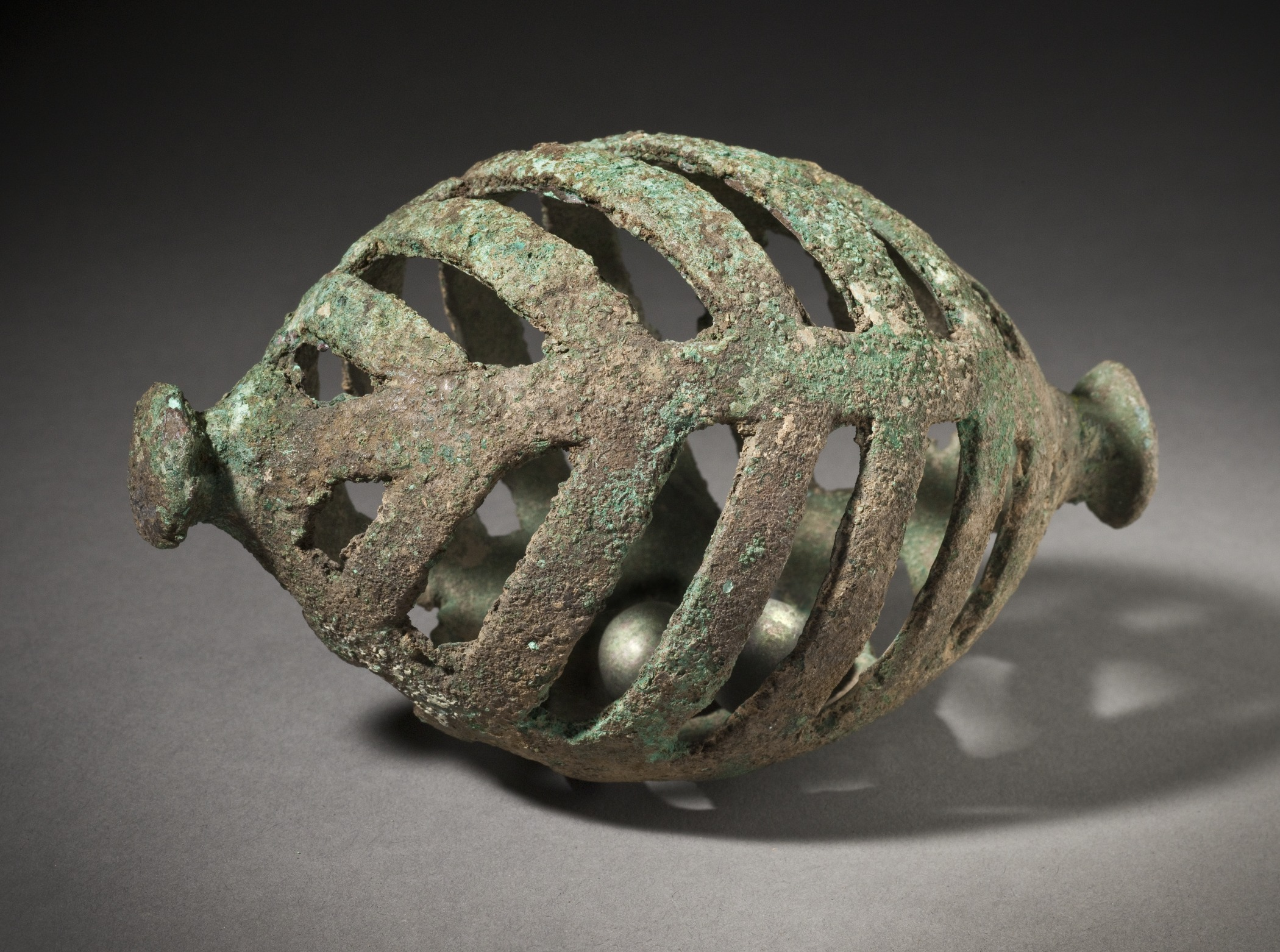
Western Iran, circa 1000-650 B.C.,3 1/8 x 5 1/4 inches

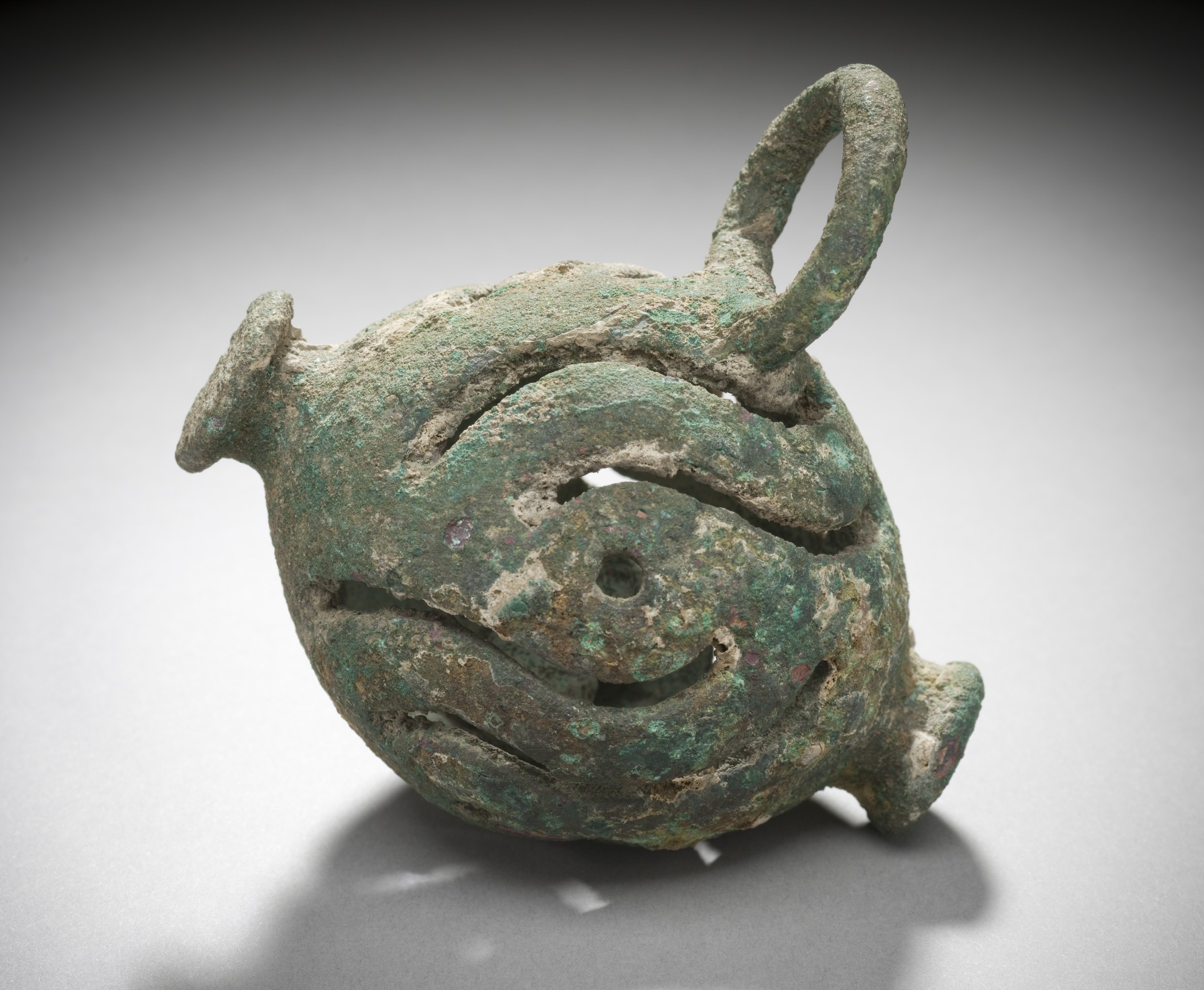
Western Iran, circa 1000-650 B.C., 3 7/8 x 3 3/4 in
Elephant bells

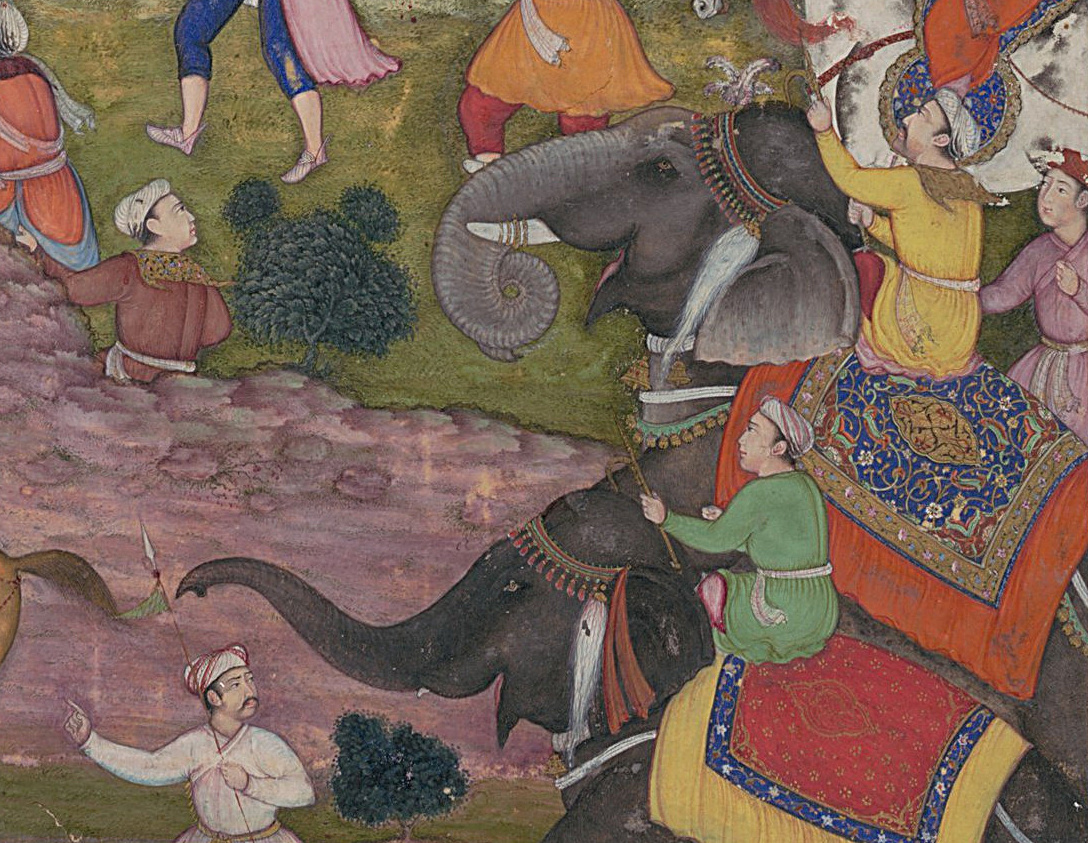
Elephants wearing large bells, as well as a row of smaller bells hanging from a collar.

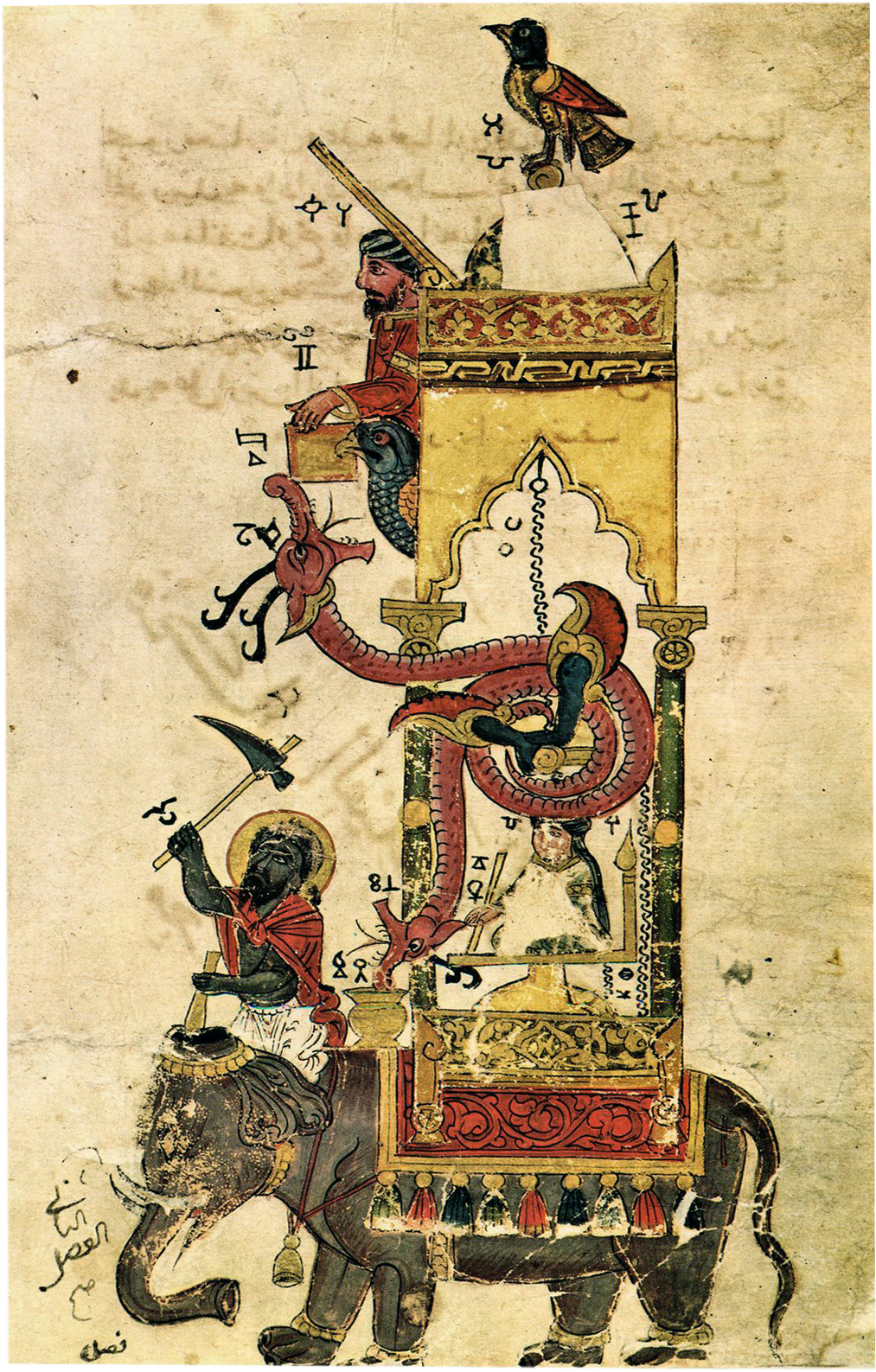
Elephant with bell under its neck. Miniature from a manuscript, 1315 A.D. The illustration is of Al-Jazari's elephant clock.

Bronze bells with and without iron clapper hung on the bridles of horses and donkeys in the Assyrian Empire. According to tradition, the Prophet Mohammed was not happy about the bells (Arabic jaras) hanging from the necks of pack animals in Arabia in pre-Islamic times. It is said that angels avoid caravans that produce such noises. Burial finds in Central Asia from the period from the 2nd century B.C. until the 8th/10th Century A.D. also show that the harness was hung with multiple bells of different sizes. In the epic Shahnameh by the Persian poet Firdausi (940/941-1020) it is mentioned that elephants were hung with large golden bells and little bells in processions.

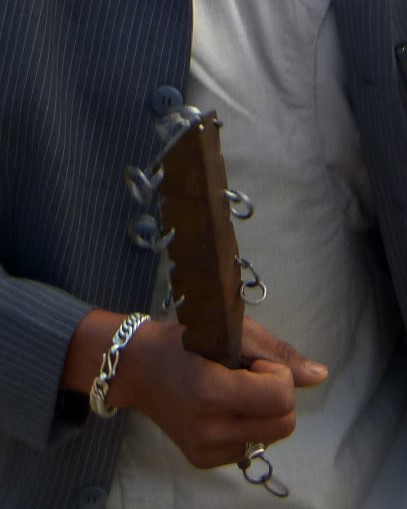
Nepali Silimi सिलिमी is similar to safail or sapai

Numerous depictions of gods in wall paintings from the Sogdian city of Old Panjakent (near Panjakent, Tajikistan, 5th century) are hung with bells and cymbals on cords, which is why these tinkling metals probably had a religious significance in addition to their decorative function. One such wall painting from the palace of Old Panjakent depicts a goddess on a throne, holding in her right hand a ladder-like object with numerous bells hanging from its crossbars, which was apparently used to produce sounds. The object, probably brought as a gift from the goddess, shows parallels to two shake idiophones that are still used in the region today. One is called by Uzbeks, Tajiks and Uyghurs safail, (sapai), and consists of two wooden sticks to which metal rings are attached. A rattling noise is produced when shaken. Today, the safail is used as an accompaniment in dance music, similar to the qairāq (two river pebbles hit against each other) and qoschuq (“wooden spoon ”). Originally it was used by shamans and later by qalandar (wandering dervishes) in ritual music.

The other is the zang used in Tajik dance music: bells attached to a leather strap worn by dancers on their wrists or legs. Sources from the Chinese Tang Dynasty (618-907) describe the performances of "Turkish" dancers, i.e. dancers who immigrated from western regions, who wore bells and little bells for rhythmic accompaniment.

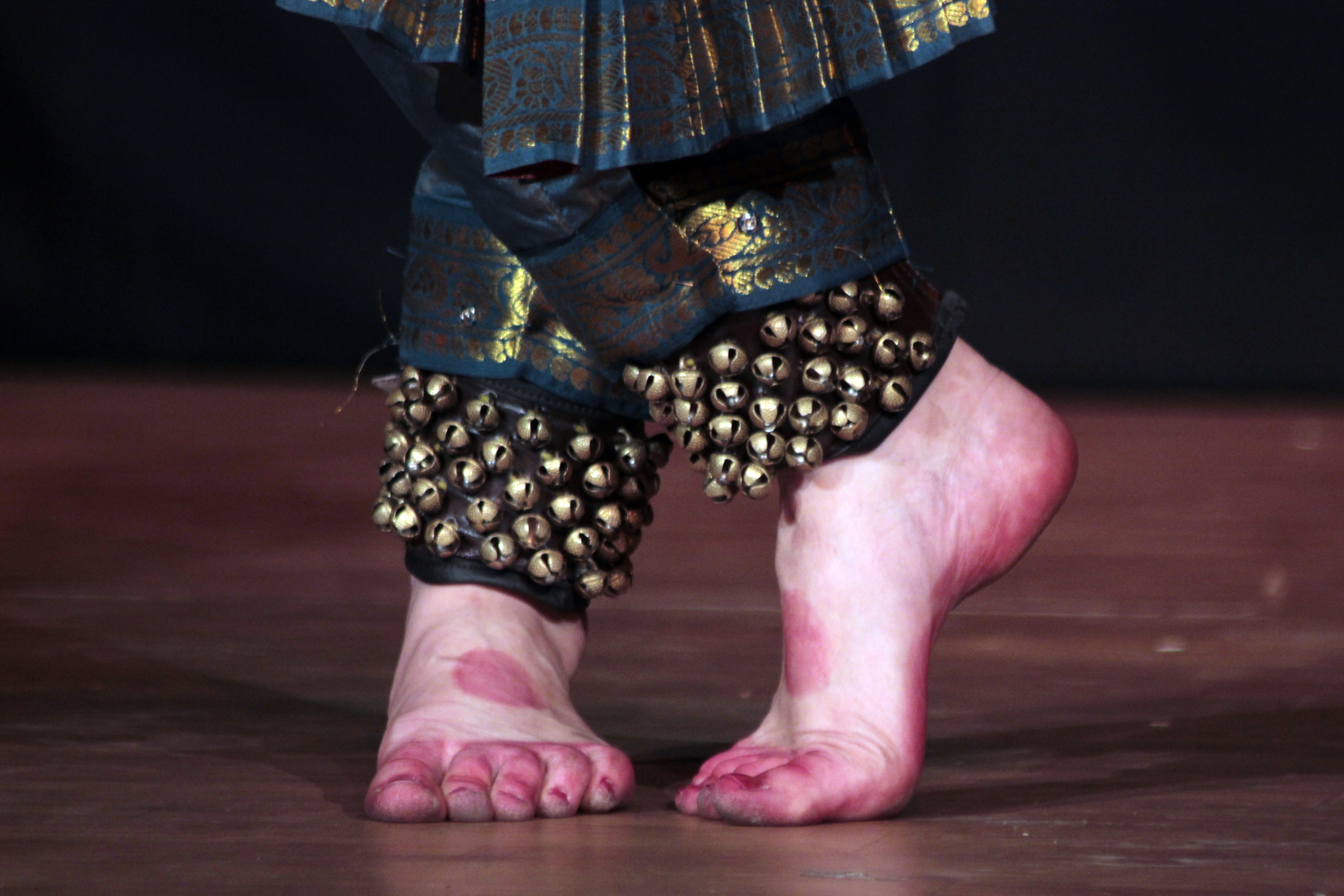
Belled anklet from India is similar to the zang belled anklet.

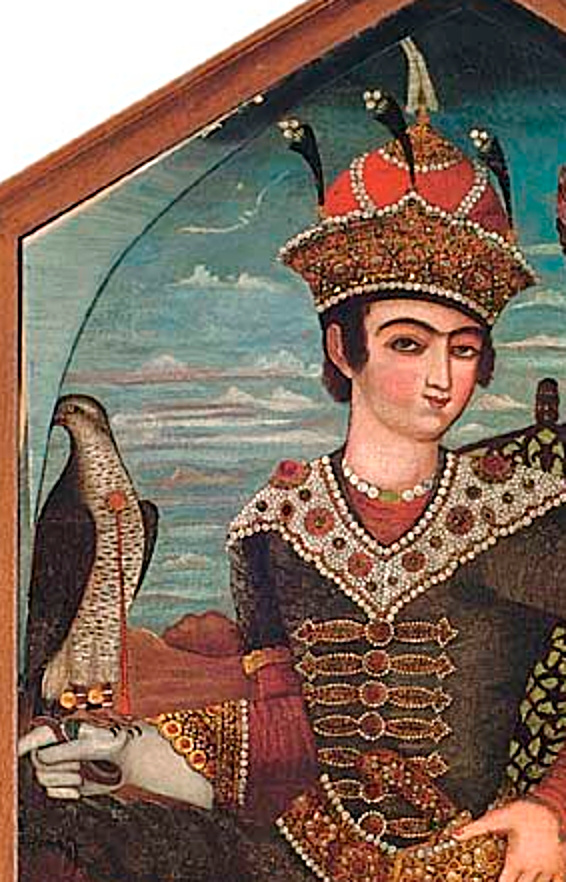
Portrait of Kay Khusraw, by Mihr 'Ali, Qajar Iran, Isfahan 1803-4, cropped to show hawk. Hawk has on hawk bells, not a zanjir string, but 2 single bells.

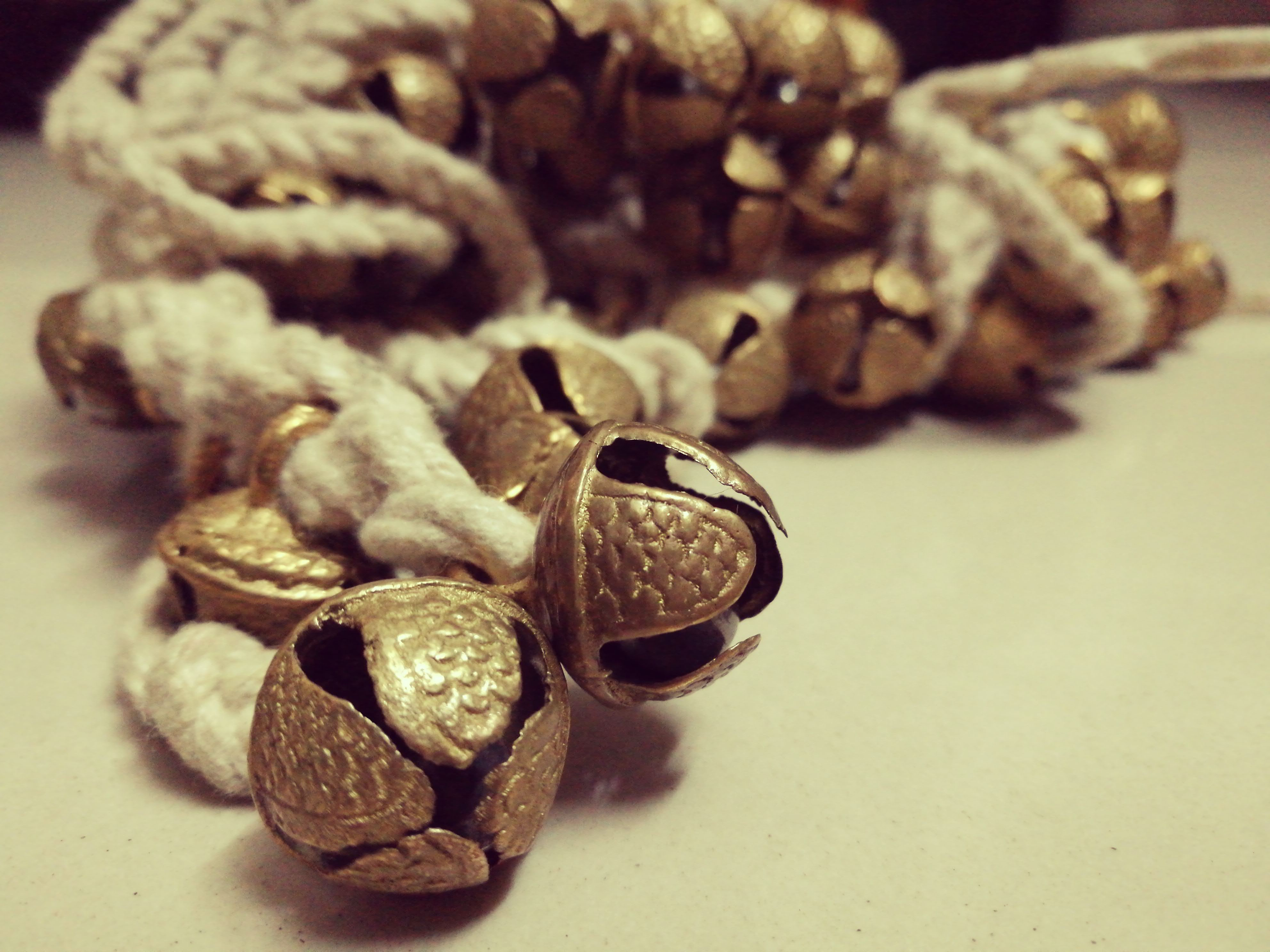
String of small bells, called zanjir (زنجی) when strung, like a chain of bells.

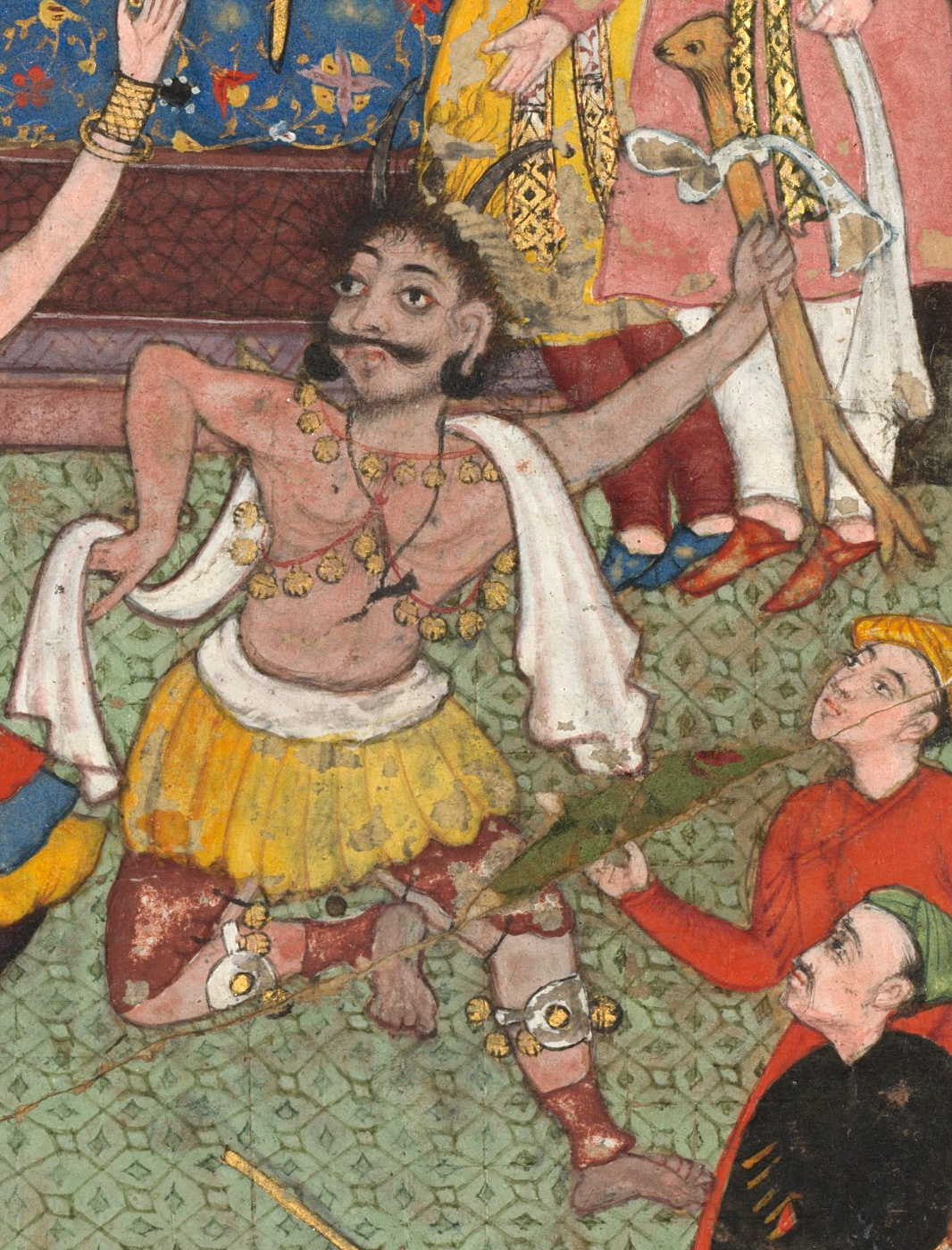
Grotesque dancer wearing Zanjir (زنجی), dancing in the court of Akbar.

=== Bells as weapons of war ===
In ancient Persia, bells were something hung on an animal or worn by a person. They were sounded in war as a weapon of terror, and worn by animals, signaling the large size of the approaching army. Animal bells could also be sounded by the men in the armies to add to the din. Cymbals too merged functions of war and music, as men clashed them.

A manuscript of the Shahnameh made in Tabriz around 1370 depicts a turbulent battle scene in which the weapons of the Persian troops fighting the Mongols included noise-making devices intended to instill fear in the enemy. For this purpose, a hydraulic organ and a mobile frame with large bells called ghulghul al-siyāh ("noisy bell") were transported.

Noise as a weapon of war is much older and already known from antiquity: The Parthians in the Iranian highlands and southern Central Asia gave battle signals with trumpets and drums and frightened their opponents with large, fur-covered hollow bodies, which, in addition to their loud thunderclap, made a shrill noise because of the rattles and bells attached to it, as Plutarch describes the battle of Carrhae in 53 B.C. According to ancient Indian sources and Greek mythology, the use of trumpets and "battle drums" with metal bells in them ultimately goes back to an Indian tradition.

== Word spread ==
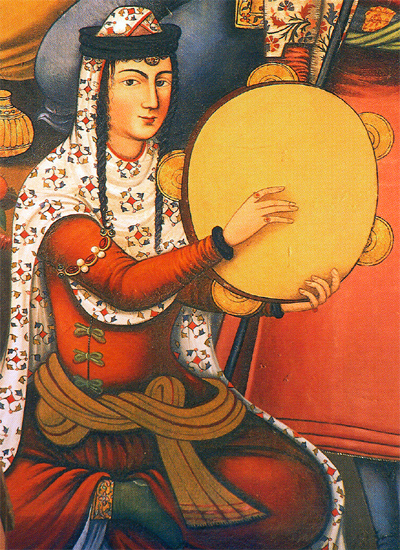
The 5 cymbals in a dayereh-e zangi are called zangūla. Modern dafs also use jingles, in the form of rings attached inside the frame.

Zang bell and sanj cymbal are linguistically related.

=== Zang ===
Persian zang means "bell" and "cymbal"; zangūla stands for the jingles on the frame drum, corresponding to dayereh-e zangi (dāyera zangī or dayere zangi), a dayereh with jingles. On Persian miniatures from the end of the 14th to the beginning of the 18th century (Timurids to Safavids) dayereh with five metal plates are most often depicted. In Afghanistan, in addition to zang for "cymbal", the word tal, which is widespread in India and derived from Sanskrit tala, is also used ("palm", "beat", "meter"), derived from the rhythmic structure of Indian music. In Afghanistan, the cymbal zang is distinguished from the Jew's harp tschang(čang). Zang occurs modified from Medieval Armenian zangak, "bell", zangakik (zangulak), "little bell" and zangakalezou, "bell clapper", as well as a Georgian loanword (zangalawi, zangalaki), "little bell". Zang-e sarangoshti (saringoshti) are the zill finger cymbals played during dances in Iran, which, according to the representations on Persian miniatures, belong to the old oriental dance tradition. In northern Afghanistan, the player of the long-necked lute dambura produces an accompanying rhythm with the zang-i kaftar bells worn on the wrist. In Uzbekistan, zang stands for a chain of small copper or brass bells that dancing girls wear on their wrists or ankles.

=== Sanj ===
The word ṣanğ (xsanj, sanj, plural ṣunūğ) for "cymbal" occurring in medieval Arabic literature probably comes from the Persian čang (tschang), at the same time ṣanğ was a less common term than ğank for the Arabic harp. The historical angular harp tschang (chang) was widespread in the Near and Middle East. In addition, tschang (chang) is a dulcimer resembling the Persian santur, which is occasionally used by Uzbeks and Tajiks in classical Shashmaqam. A Central Asian Turkic source from the 11th century inscribed çenğ finger cymbals, which are now called zill in Turkish. The word has survived in Turkish as çeng-i harbî for a musical genre played by mehterhâne (military bands) and as çengi (belly dancer). In Uzbek, cymbals and bells are called zang (tschang, chang) and in Tatar Чаң (tschang), but among the Uzbeks in Afghanistan they are called tüsak. The Arabic-Persian sanj or jhanj is one of the many names for Indian cymbals, along with manjira, tal or elathalam. The kettle drum pairs naqqāra, long trumpets nafīr and sanj, along with other loud-sounding musical instruments, formed the Naubat Palace Orchestra in the Mughal Empire.

== Everyday use ==
In Iraq, zanj is usually understood as paired cymbals made of brass or bronze, which come in different sizes. The cords for holding on are attached to a hole in the center of the hump. Iraqi paired cymbals were used in military music, in churches and for all kinds of other processions. In addition to the cylinder drum dammām, they provide the musical accompaniment for Shiite passion plays. Less commonly, small finger cymbals with a diameter of four to five centimeters are called zanj.

In the "fitness center" Zurchaneh ("Power House"), which has a long tradition in Iran and neighboring countries, men strengthen their muscles to the rhythm of a hanging bell zang-e zurchaneh and the goblet drum, tombak or zarb. A musician, who plays both instruments and occasionally sings, sits on the raised edge of the arena, which is always octagonal. The music is intended to create a relaxed atmosphere during strenuous strength training and competitions. The zang also marks the beginning, the change and the end of the exercises.

In South Khorasan, Iran, zang are still made by local blacksmiths for herd animals such as cows, and sheep to wear. The bells are made of welded and hammered sheet metal, about the size of a man's hand. The bells date to the Safavid to Qajar eras.

The oldest bronze bells excavated in Armenia date from the middle of the 2nd millennium BC. The Armenian bell zangak was or still is occasionally used to accentuate the rhythm of some chants in the liturgy of the Armenian Apostolic Church, sometimes together with cymbals. The zangak is hemispherical, has a small iron clapper and is made in different pitches. The zangak is otherwise not used in Armenian music.

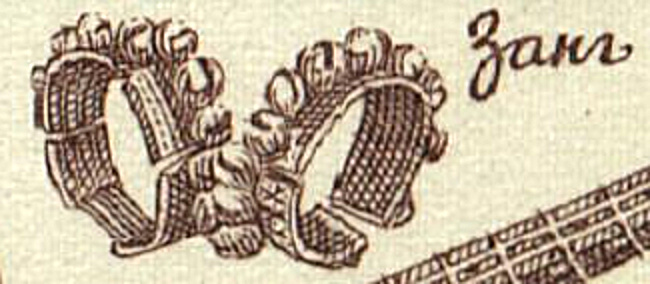
Zang, bracelet of bells from Uzbekistan.

The zang-i kaftar ('dove bell') is a pair of ring-shaped jingles tied together on a short string and used in light music in northern Afghanistan. A clamp with a diameter of 2.5 centimeters consists of a sheet metal strip that has been bent in a circle so that the long edges meet in the middle of the outside. The cords that connect the two bells are attached to metal pins that produce the sound of rattling inside the bells. A player of the long-necked dambura lute occasionally wears four or five connected pairs of jingles on his right wrist and shakes them while plucking the strings. The dambura player – mainly of Uzbek origin – performs in teahouses (samowad) as a soloist with his singing or he accompanies two singers. Ensembles in tea houses also play the two-stringed fiddle ghichak, the goblet drum zerbaghali and finger cymbals (zang, Uzbek tüsak). The finger cymbals in northern Afghanistan probably go back to Indian influence. The method of rhythmic accompaniment points to the relationship of teahouse songs to dance music.

== Literature ==
Jeremy Montagu: Zang, and Zanj. In: Laurence Libin (ed.): The Grove Dictionary of Musical Instruments. Vol. 5. Oxford University Press, Oxford/New York 2014, p. 371
