= Koore =

Koore may refer to:

- Koore people, an ethnic group of Ethiopia
- Koore language, their language

== See also ==
- Coore, a village in Ireland
- Koor (disambiguation)
