= Coor =

Coor or COOR may refer to:

- Lattie F. Coor (born 1936), American academic
- Coor Crags, a landform in Antarctica
- COOR, a chemical formula for an ester

== See also ==
- Coore, a village in Ireland
- Coors (disambiguation)
- Corr (disambiguation)
- Koor (disambiguation)
