= Pat Corr =

Northern Irish footballer

Personal information
- Full name: Patrick Malachy Corr
- Date of birth: 31 March 1927
- Place of birth: Enniskillen, Northern Ireland
- Date of death: 29 January 2017 (aged 89)
- Place of death: Ballymena, Northern Ireland
- Height: 1.73 m (5 ft 8 in)
- Position: Centre forward

Senior career*
Years	Team	Apps	(Gls)
–1949	Seven Towers		
1949–1951	Ballymena United	31	(9)
1951	Coleraine		
1951–1953	Burnley	1	(0)
- Glenavon

International career
1950–1958	Irish League XI	13	(2)
1951	Northern Ireland Amateurs	1	(0)
1957	Northern Ireland B	1	(0)
- * Club domestic league appearances and goals

Patrick Malachy Corr (31 March 1927 – 29 January 2017) was a Northern Irish footballer who played as a centre forward. Best remembered for his time in the Irish League with Glenavon, he also made one appearance in the Football League for Burnley.

== Career statistics ==
Appearances and goals by club, season and competition
Club	Season	League			National cup (Note: Includes Irish Cup, FA Cup)		Other		Total	
Club	Season	Division	Apps	Goals	Apps	Goals	Apps	Goals	Apps	Goals
Ballymena United	1948–49	Irish League	10	6	—		2 (Note: 1 appearance in Ulster Cup, 1 appearance in County Antrim Shield)	0	12	6
Ballymena United	1949–50	Irish League	21	3	1	0	17 (Note: 8 appearances and 1 goal in City Cup, 5 appearances in Ulster Cup, 3 appearances in Gold Cup, 1 appearance in County Antrim Shield)	1	39	4
Ballymena United	Total		31	9	1	0	19	1	61	10
Burnley	1951–52	First Division	1	0	0	0	—		1	0
Career total			32	9	1	0	19	1	62	10

== Honours ==
Glenavon

- Irish League: 1956–57
- Irish Cup: 1956–57
- Gold Cup: 1956–57
