= Liam Corr =

Scottish footballer (born 1990)

Personal information
- Date of birth: 19 June 1990
- Place of birth: Falkirk, Scotland
- Position: Midfielder

Youth career
- Stirling Albion Youths

Senior career*
Years	Team	Apps	(Gls)
2008–2010	Stirling Albion	37	(2)
2010–	Stirling University		
- * Club domestic league appearances and goals

Liam Corr (born 19 June 1990) is a Scottish former professional footballer. Corr now works at Falkirk as their HEAD OF FOOTBALL OPERATIONS AND ANALYSIS.

== Career ==
=== Domestic ===
Corr made his debut for Stirling on 29 March 2008 against Livingston. Manager Allan Moore offered Corr a professional contract, which he signed on 14 May 2008.

=== International ===
Corr has also captained the Scottish School Boys squad in 2008. He made his first of four appearances for Scotland School Boys in the 2006–07 season and then was picked again in 2007–08. He was later named captain of the squad and led the team to victories over Australia, Jersey and Wales. Games also played were draws against both Northern and Republic of Ireland.

Corr also led out the first ever Scotland squad to play at the new Wembley Stadium. A historic moment for the team although they were unable to overcome a persistent England team who defeated the courageous Scots.
