= Eberhard Cohrs =

German comedian and actor

- Born: 4 January 1921; Dresden, Saxony, Germany
- Died: 17 August 1999 (aged 78); Diensdorf-Radlow, Brandenburg, Germany
- Occupation: Comedian
- Spouse(s): 1. Lieselotte Homuth; 3. Dagmar Graf
- Children: Petra; Matthias; Andreas; Christopher (1972-1998)

Eberhard Cohrs (4 January 1921 – 17 August 1999) was a German comedian and actor. A short man, he was frequently known as "[der] Kleene mit der großen Gusche", an Upper Saxon dialect epithet which loosely translates as "the little guy with the big mouth".

== Life ==
=== Early years ===
The father of Eberhard Cohrs was a hat maker, originally from Uelzen in Lower Saxony. His mother Alma, who also worked in the little hat making business, came from the Vogtland. His first ambition as a youth was to become a jockey. His weight of approximately 40 kg justified this choice, but his legs were too short and he fell back on his second ambition, to be a pastry and cake baker: this was the trade in which he was apprenticed between 1936 and 1939. However, war resumed in 1939 and he was conscripted for military service. As the war neared its end, between September 1944 and February 1945 he was a member of the SS-Totenkopf battalion and a guard at the Sachsenhausen concentration camp, although he was able to conceal these aspects of his war service from the public during his life. By the time the war ended, in May 1945, his mother had been killed in an air-raid and his father was dying.

=== The performer ===
His first stage appearance took place in the Weißer Hirsch ("White Hart") quarter of Dresden. He then underwent an audition before the "International Artists' Club" in the "Dresden Skala" on 11 November 1945, after which he embarked on a career as a variety performer. He quickly found Dresden becoming "too small", however, and looked for a way to bring laughter to a wider public. In 1947 he succeeded in moving his base to Leipzig, and it was here that he quickly became a favourite with the public, known affectionately as "the little guy with the big mouth" As a "young talent", in 1948 he also worked in Berlin with the Berliner Kammerbrettl cabaret recently set up by Hans Joachim Heinrichs.

The head of culture at Dresden Radio, Ulli Busch (real name Richard Hahnewald), gave him his first big opportunity to work on the radio, and towards the end of the 1950s he moved into television, thanks to Heinz Quermann, appearing from 1959 in the by then established television variety show Da lacht der Bär (literally "There the bear laughs"). Stage performance would nevertheless feature strongly through the rest of his career, and in 1961, thanks to Wolfgang E. Struck, Cohrs made his debut at the Friedrichstadt-Palast review theatre in Berlin. He toured with fellow theatre performers Roby Hanson, Horst Feuerstein and Bobby Bölke. He appeared as a regular guest on radio and television, produced records, and took small movie roles. In 1976 he even moved (briefly) into Opera, taking a supporting part in a production of Die Fledermaus at the Rostock People's Theatre (Volkstheater Rostock).

The 1960s and 70s found Eberhard Cohrs in the mainstream of East Germany's entertainment and media worlds. His formula, based on "earthy Saxon humour", covered themes such as the differences between sophisticated Berlin and provincial Saxony, between "high politics" and peoples' daily difficulties, and gave public voice to the plight of the so-called "little man". Although his performances were necessarily apolitical, his brand of humour and his contrived Saxon punning, were not appreciated by every Party Apparatchik, and in the early 1970s he was banned from writing his own material.

Early in 1977 Cohrs, now aged 56, succeeded in escaping to West Berlin, "turning his back on East Germany for ever", and stating that the restrictions in East Germany had become unbearable. The price to be paid may have appeared to include separation from his wife, Dagmar, and young son, Christopher, but as matters turned out, within a couple of months his wife and son were not merely permitted, but required, to join him in West Germany, following a decision by East Germany's ruling Socialist Unity Party to expel them.

In terms of television, the Eberhard Cohrs formula did not transfer easily from East to West. His first appearance on mainstream television in the West, on Rudi Carrell's show Am laufenden Band, was a "fiasco" according to television chief Peter Gerlach. It was not merely the Saxon's humour that baffled Western audiences. Three decades of separation had given westerners little opportunity to familiarize themselves with the dialects of Saxony, and the show was produced in Bremen, which, even by West German standards, was a long way from Dresden. The rich Saxon dialect that delighted East German audiences encountered blank incomprehension from studio audiences in Bremen. Nevertheless, during his time in the west Cohrs made further television appearances, for instance in the sketch series Ein verrücktes Paar where he and Harald Juhnke appeared as guests. He also continued to work for Rudi Carrell, providing gags and sketches for Carrell's television shows. Away from the television studios he appeared beside Dieter Hallervorden in a stage version of Nonstop Nonsense at Berlin's Wühlmäuse Cabaret Theatre and at the Karl May Festival in Bad Segeberg. His brand of humour never caught on in West Germany to the same extent as it had in the east, however.

After the Berlin Wall came down, Eberhard Cohrs returned to his native city, appearing in Dresden at the end of 1989. From the outset it became apparent that his public remained true to his comedy, not merely in Saxony, but across the entire (former) German Democratic Republic. During the next few years he enjoyed popular success and re-established his television career, appearing on shows produced by the Leipzig based MDR (television) company with fellow stars such as Leni Statz, Wolfgang Roeder and Winfried Krause.

=== Personal ===
Eberhard Cohrs married the cabaret performer Lieselotte Homuth in 1945. Following their divorce in 1957 he remained close to their recently born daughter Petra. His second marriage produced two sons, Matthias and Andreas, born in the late 1950s. His third marriage, to fellow variety performer Dagmar Graf, was followed by the birth of their son Christopher in 1972. Christopher died as the result of a diving accident in 1998.

Cohrs was diagnosed with Colorectal cancer in 1997. He was immediately operated on. The next two years were characterised by repeated stays in hospital and, towards the end, a growing dependency on Morphine to try and diminish the pain of the illness. There was a curious incident on 19 July 1999 when he hit the headlines by shooting his (by now estranged) third wife, Dagmar with an old pistol. Four bullets entered her body, and for about a week her life seemed to be in danger. Michel Neff, a local official, told the press that Cohrs had been so befuddled by morphine and other drugs that he had been unaware of his actions: a lawyer for Cohrs explained that his client had been deeply depressed and that the incident was a tragic accident for which his client could not be blamed. Nevertheless, it was also reported that Cohrs and his wife had become separated and that she had found a new life-partner. Reports also mentioned the refusal of the lawyer to deny rumours of family ructions, possibly involving money. The incident appeared to give rise, at least potentially, to criminal charges regarding both the shooting of Dagmar and the possession, without a permit, of a fire arm for which a permit was required. Cohrs himself was vague as to the provenance of the pistol, which he had been given a long time ago, as a present. However, as Dagmar was taken out of intensive care a week after the shooting, the local prosecutor announced a preliminary view that Cohrs was not medically fit to be tried, and added that there was no point in placing him in investigative detention because clearly he was too ill to run away in the event of charges ever being laid against him. By this time his lawyer was explaining that his client had not even recognised his estranged wife. In the event Eberhard Cohrs died at his home at Scharmützelsee less than three weeks later, on 19 August 1999. He was aged 78.

Shortly before his death Eberhard Cohrs disinherited his third wife, the writer Dagmar Cohrs, in favour of the two sons from his second marriage, with whom he had recently re-established contact.
