= Kur (surname) =

Kur or Kür is the surname of the following people:

- Bob Kur (born 1948), American television journalist
- Camilla Kur Larsen (born 1989), Danish association football player
- İsmet Kür (1916–2013), Turkish educator, journalist, columnist and writer
- Pınar Kür (1943–2025), Turkish novelist, dramatist, and translator, daughter of İsmet
- Stanisław Kur (born 1929), Polish biblical scholar and Roman Catholic priest
