= Qairaq =

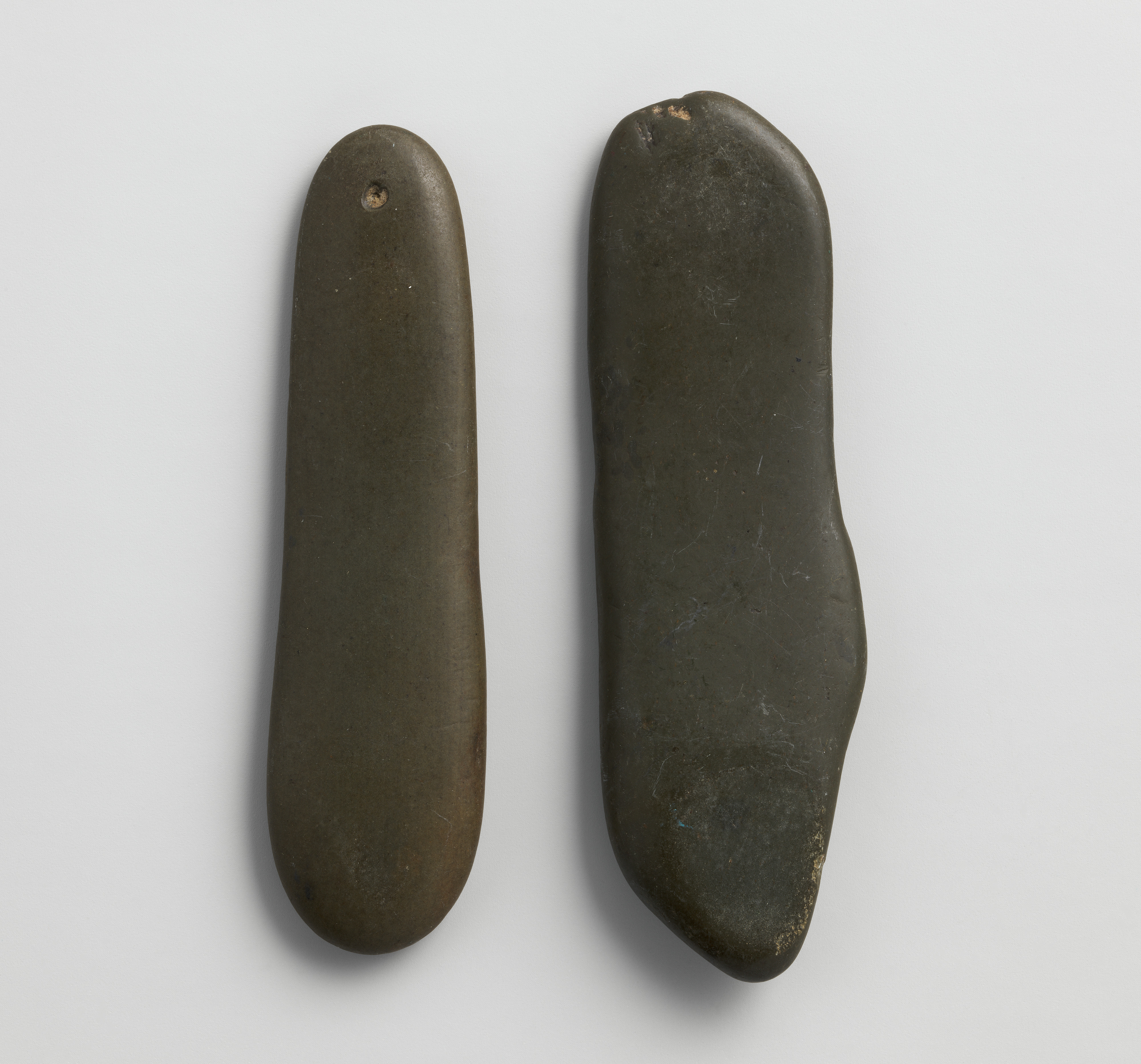
- Qairaq or kairak (stone castanets) mid-20th century, Afghanistan

Percussion instrument
- Other names: kairak, tash kairak
- Classification: idiophones
- Hornbostel–Sachs classification: 111.12 (Concussion idiophones or plaque-clappers, Two or more complementary sonorous parts are struck against each other.)
- Developed: Used in the music of Tajiks, Uzbeks and Afghans

Related instruments
- krakeb

The qairaq or kairak are flat oval stones used as clappers or castanets. They are small enough to hold two in one hand and are used in the music of Tajik and Uzbek peoples. They are used as a percussion instrument and shaken, a pair in each hand to make clicking sounds and rattles.

Among the Tajiks, the instrument is played among those living in the plains or river valleys.

The kairak was photographed in 1869–1872 by a Russian photographer, who was documenting Russian Turkestan. He found the instrument in the hands of traveling musicians and photographed both the musicians playing it, as well as the instruments themselves. In one photo he laid the rocks out with the other instruments to be photographed.

A similar instrument to that in the Russian photos is in the collection of the Metropolitan Museum of Art. The instrument in the museum's collection was collected in Afghanistan.

Today qairaqs are used by women at marriage ceremonies and "life-cycle ceremonies." In 1869. they were also played by batcha or "baz", dancing boys who sometimes dressed as women.

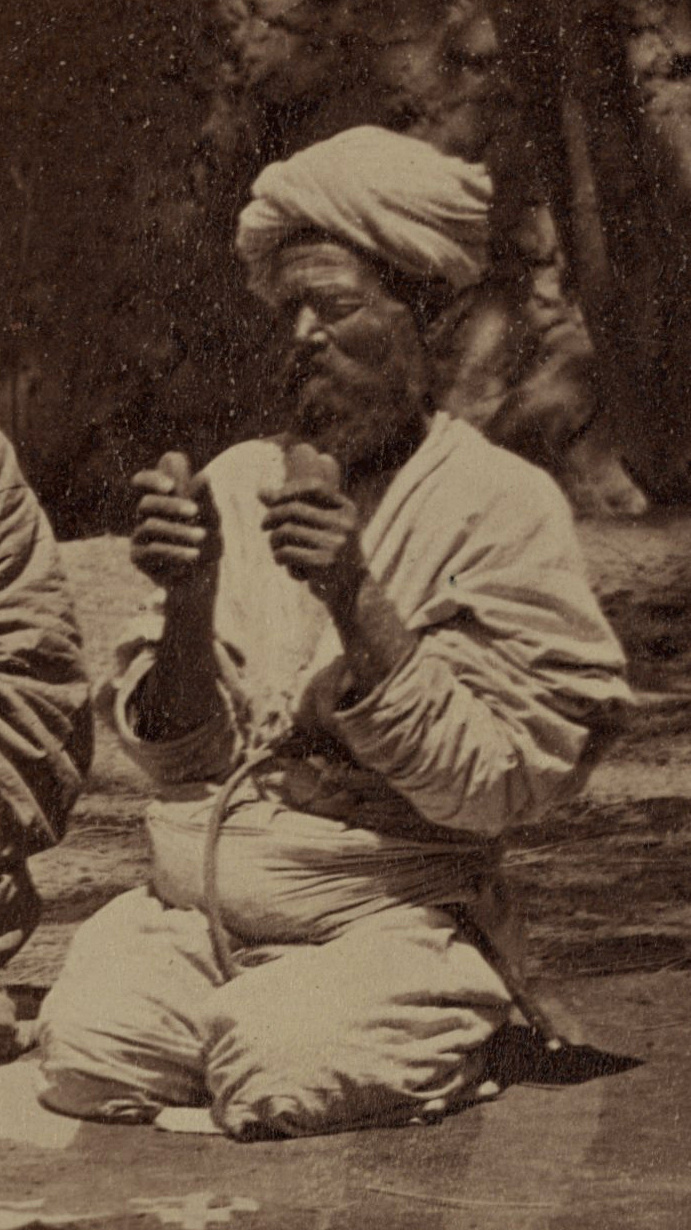
Musician plays a pair of qairaq in each hand

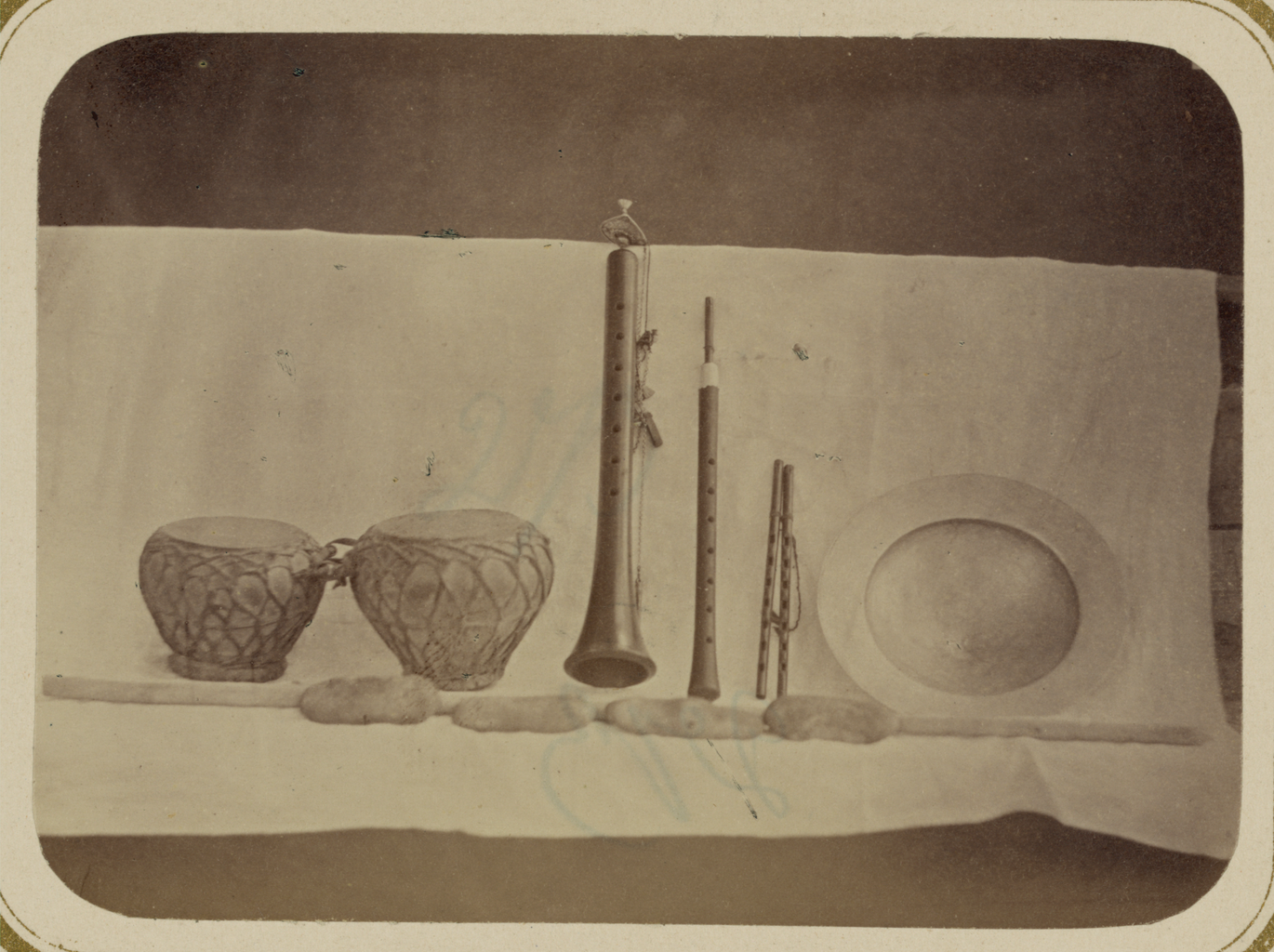
Two pairs of qairaq lie in a line beneath the other instruments. Top row, far right is the tas.

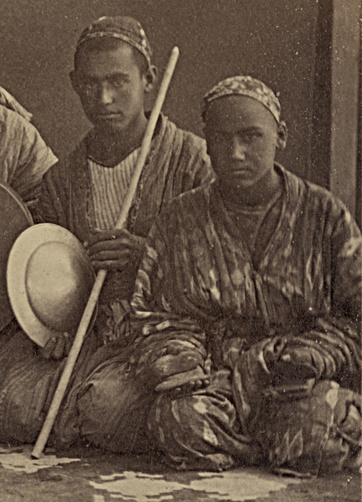
Batcha, or Dancing Boys, one with a tas cymbal, one with two pairs of qairaq.

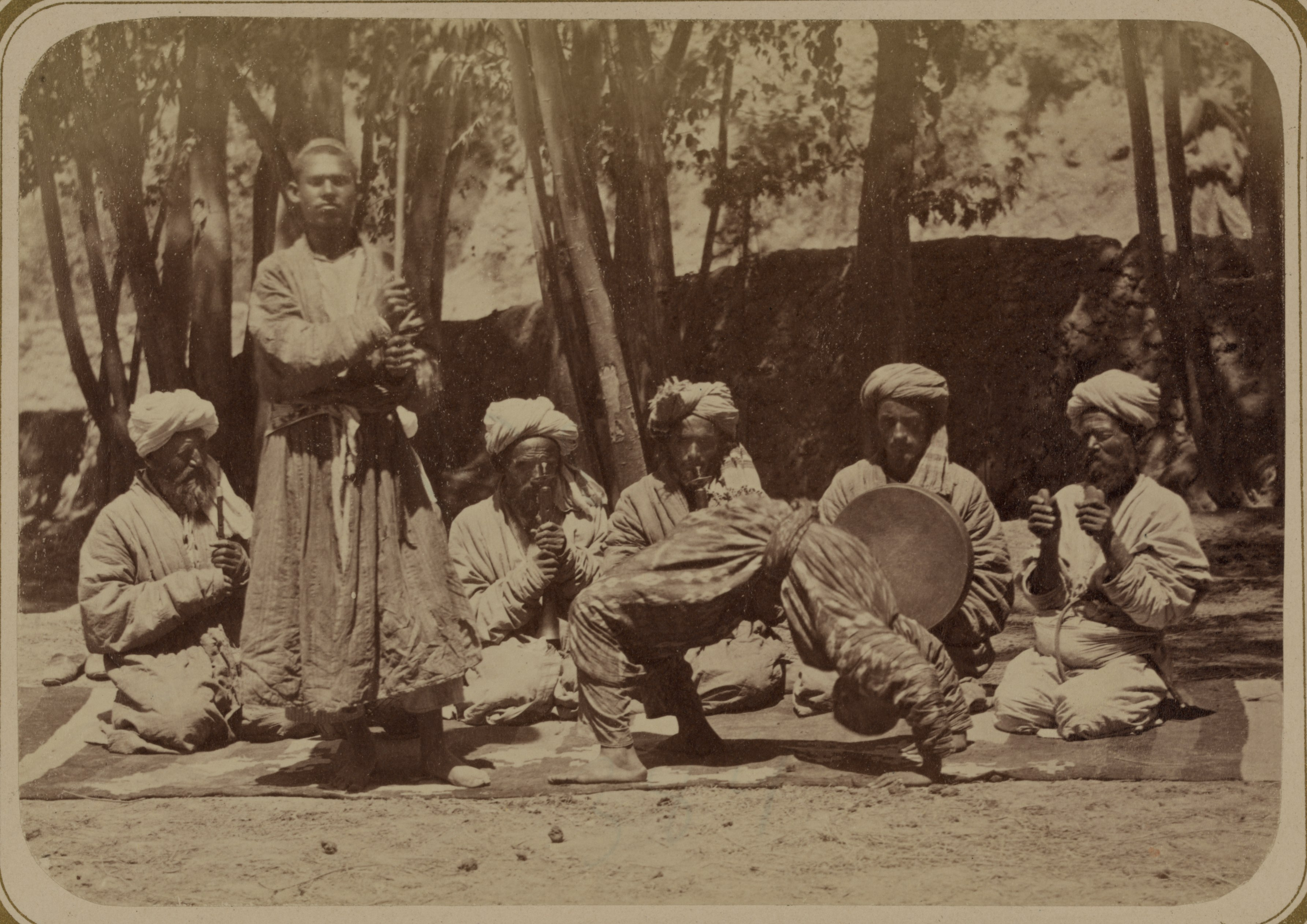
Trupa muzykantov. Tas-baz mualakchi kairak baz (a troupe of musicians, dancer who also plays the tas, dancer who also plays the kairak.

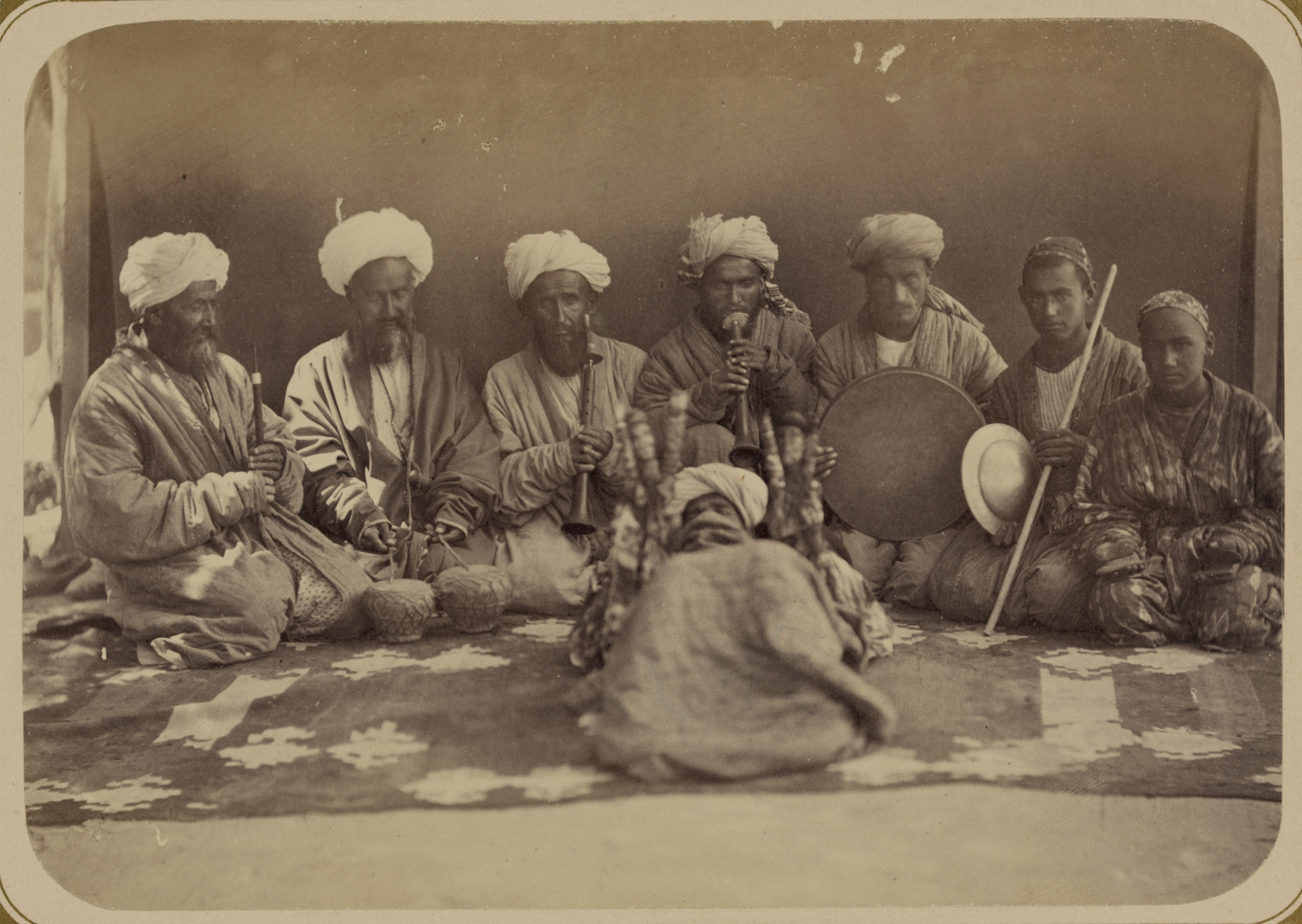
The same group of musicians. The boys are posed with their instruments (tas and kairak) on the right.

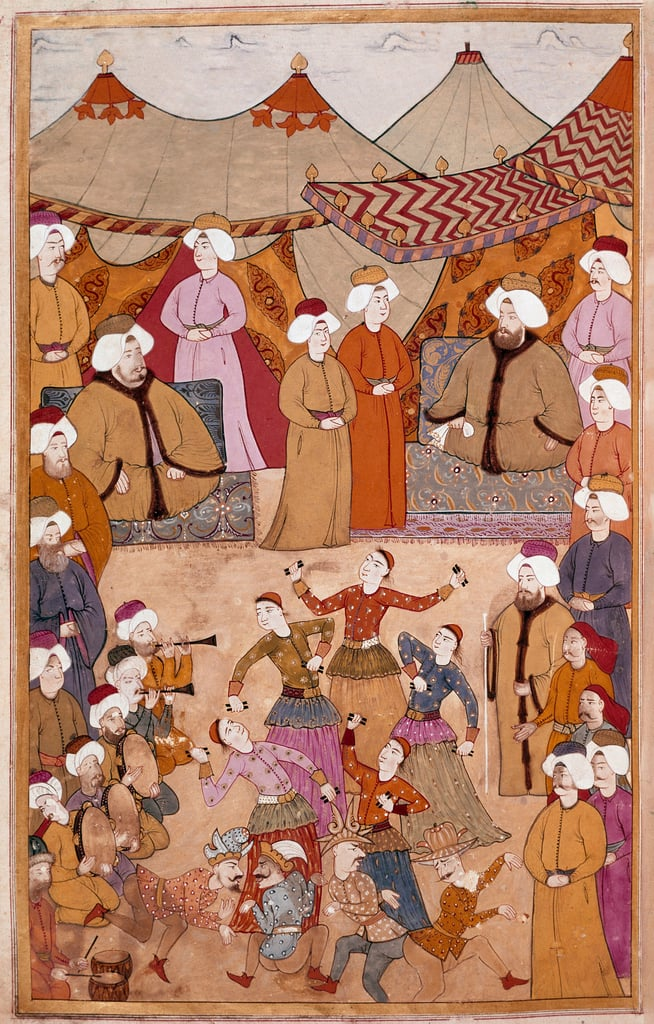
Dance for the Pleasure of Sultan Ahmet III (1673–1736). The women are dancing, holding qairaqs or possibly krakebs.
