= Coors 200 =

There have been three races named Coors 200:

- Coors 200 (USAC), a USAC National Championship Citicorp Cup Champ Car race held at Texas World Speedway in 1978
- Coors 200 (Mesa Marin), a NASCAR West Series races held at Mesa Marin Raceway most years from 1977 to 2005
- Coors 200 (South Boston), a NASCAR Busch Series race held at South Boston Speedway from 1986 to 1990
