= Coors Cutter =

Discontinued non-alcoholic beverage

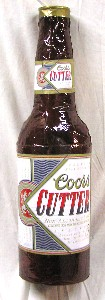
- Type: non-alcoholic beverage
- Manufacturer: Coors Brewing Company
- Introduced: 1991 with the formula revamped in 1994

Coors Cutter is a non-alcoholic beverage from Coors Brewing Company. It was introduced in 1991 with the formula revamped in 1994. It is still available in some markets.
