= Coors Amphitheatre =

Coors Amphitheatre may refer to the following amphitheatres:

- Coors Amphitheatre (San Diego), later Sleep Train Amphitheatre
- Coors Amphitheatre (Greenwood Village, Colorado), later Comfort Dental Amphitheatre and Fiddler's Green Amphitheatre

== See also ==
- Coors Light Amphitheatre
