= Anne Molson =

Canadian philanthropist and women's education activist

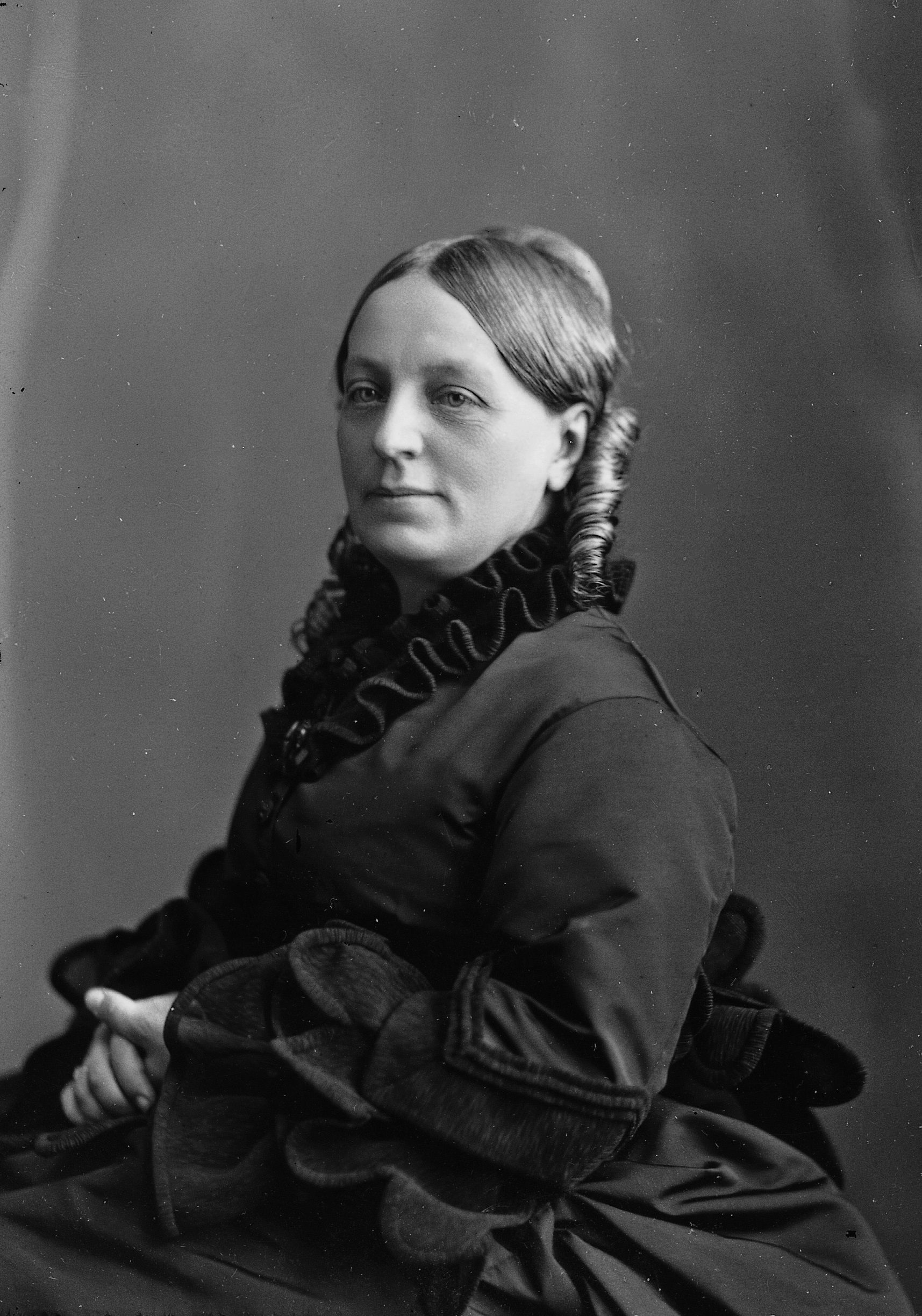
- Molson photographed in 1873.
- Born: 8 April 1824
- Died: 3 January 1899 (aged 74)
- Occupation: Philanthropist
- Known for: Education activism; campaigning for the admission of women to McGill University
- Family: Molson family

Anne Molson (8 April 1824 – 3 January 1899) was a Canadian philanthropist and proponent of access to education, best known for her work in opening admissions to McGill University to women.

== Early life ==
A member of the prominent Anglophone Molson family, Molson was born in Montreal, Quebec in 1824, the third child of William Molson and Elizabeth Badgley. Molson's maternal grandfather was politician Francis Badgley, and her maternal uncle was William Badgley.

Although her father believed in higher education for young men, he did not consider it important for women. His daughters were subsequently educated by private tutors to a lower standard than their brother. Molson would grow to develop an interest in furthering access to learning, particularly for women, in the hopes her daughter Edith would receive a better education than Molson herself had received.

== Marriage ==
On 9 June 1845, at the age of 21, Molson married her first cousin John Molson, son of John Molson Jr. Molson's marriage settlement provided her a level of financial autonomy that was unusual for women of the time in Lower Canada. The couple would receive £300 a year from her father, of which Anne would control £50 independently; her property would also be considered hers, independent of her husband's authority.

By 1852, the couple had five children together, of which three survived into adulthood. Following the death of John Molson Jr. in 1860, they inherited and moved into the historic country house, Belmont Hall, on Sherbrooke Street.

== Education advocacy ==
=== Anne Molson Gold Medal ===
In 1864, Molson posed as a male friend to approach John William Dawson, principal of McGill University. She proposed the idea of providing an endowment to fund a gold medal, which would be awarded to the best student in physics and mathematics. When Dawson was receptive to the proposal, Anne revealed her identity to Dawson at the urging of her father, Molson, ensuring the award would ultimately be named after her. As of the 2020s, the award continues to be offered by McGill's Faculty of Science.

=== Montreal Ladies’ Educational Association ===
At the time of Molson's endowment to McGill, the university did not admit women as students, but public pressure was mounting on the institution's leadership to amend this policy. Dawson and his wife, Margaret, visited the United Kingdom in 1870 and researched the work of the Ladies’ Educational Association of Edinburgh, which at the time was campaigning for women to gain access to higher education in Scotland. He returned to Quebec with a detailed proposal for founding a similar organisation in Montreal.

On 10 May 1871, Montreal's English-speaking bourgeoisie formed the Montreal Ladies’ Educational Association during a meeting at Belmont Hall, selected due to its proximity to McGill's campus. Molson was elected president and her husband, treasurer. The association countered McGill's inaccessibility to women by organising independent courses, taught by McGill faculty, that mirrored offerings at the university. One such instructor was Goldwin Smith. Molson enrolled her daughter, Edith, in courses by the association, and attended some herself.

When Edith died suddenly at the age of 19 in September 1872, Molson's involvement with the association slowly declined until she resigned as president in December 1873. She was succeeded by her sister-in-law, Louise Goddard Molson. Anne Molson would continue to attend meetings occasionally afterwards, and the association would credit her early active leadership as almost entirely responsible for its "existence [and] prosperity".

Dawson inquired as to whether Molson would be able to fund women's classes at McGill directly, though she declined; despite her degree of financial autonomy, most of the family's finances were still controlled by her husband. In 1884, Dawson's financial difficulties were resolved when Donald Alexander Smith donated $50,000 to fund the first two years of education for women at McGill. This donation was both unexpected and unprompted. Some analysts, including biographer Bettina Bradbury, have suggested that Molson may have played a role in influencing Smith's decision to make the donation, as she was a friend of Smith. Women enrolled in classes at McGill that year, and the Montreal Ladies’ Educational Association wound down in 1885.

== Other philanthropy ==
Molson was an active contributor to, and patron of, the Montreal Ladies’ Benevolent Society. She also served as honorary president of the Montreal Society of Decorative Art.

== Death ==
Molson died suddenly in early 1899 while on vacation in Atlantic City, a few months before her 75th birthday.

== Notable recipients of the Anne Molson Gold Medal ==
- 1890: Henry Marshall Tory, who went on to become the first president of the University of Alberta
- 1898: Harriet Brooks, eventually a nuclear physicist, was the first woman to receive the award
- 1921: Anna McPherson, later the first female professor in the Department of Physics at McGill University
- 1925: Mary Laura Chalk Rowles, eventually the first woman to earn a PhD in physics from McGill
- 1941: Louis Siminovitch, molecular biologist and pioneer in human genetics
- 1971: Jim Tilley, figure in business and later poet
- 1989: Victoria Kaspi, astrophysicist and McGill professor
