= Molsons Bank =

Canadian bank (1855–1925)

- Industry: Banking
- Founded: 19 May 1855
- Defunct: 1925
- Fate: Acquired by the Bank of Montreal
- Headquarters: Molson Bank Building, Montreal, Quebec
- Number of locations: 125

The Molsons Bank was a Canadian bank founded in Montreal, Quebec, by brothers William (1793–1875) and John Molson, Jr. (1787–1860), the sons of brewery magnate John Molson.

== Operations ==
In 1837, the bank opened and issued its first banknotes. In 1850, it was constituted under the Free Banking Act passed by the parliament of the Province of Canada. To increase its powers and its revenue, the bank was incorporated in 1855. It was granted a charter on May 19, 1855 in Montreal allowing it to operate its bank in the same way as other banks. With its head office at the corner of St. James & St. Peter streets (today known as Saint-Jacques and Saint-Pierre streets) in Montreal, it continued in operation until 1925 when it merged with the Bank of Montreal.

== Branches ==
The bank operated 125 branches primarily in Quebec and Ontario. It also had branches in western Canada and agents in the US and UK.

The Ottawa branch of the Molson Bank was located in the Marshall Building at 14 Metcalfe Street. Built in an Italianate-Romanesque style between 1881 and 1882, it originally housed the Ottawa branch of the Union Bank of Lower Canada before it moved to its new premises at 128 Wellington Street in 1888. In recent years, the building has been used as a tourism information centre; a mosaic of the Molson Bank coat of arms is still extant on the interior floor. The building was listed on the Registry of Historical Places of Canada in 2008.

The Bank of Montreal at 3 King Street South, Waterloo, Ontario, is a former branch of the Molson Bank that was built in 1914 and is on the Registry of Historical Places of Canada.

== Presidents ==
1. William Molson, 1855–1875
2. John Thomas Molson, 1875–1879
3. Thomas Workman, 1879–1889
4. John Henry Robinson Molson, 1889–1897
5. William Molson Macpherson, 1897–1922
6. Frederick William Molson, 1922–1924

== Gallery ==
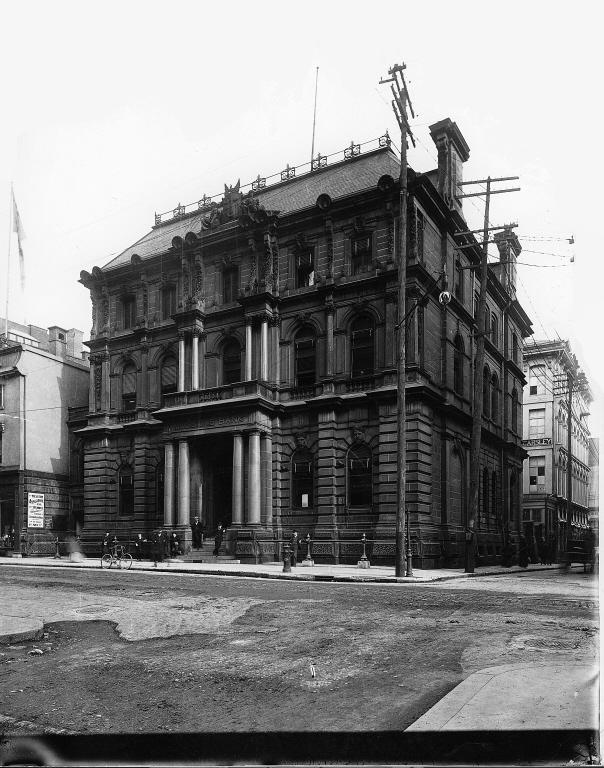
Montreal (head office)

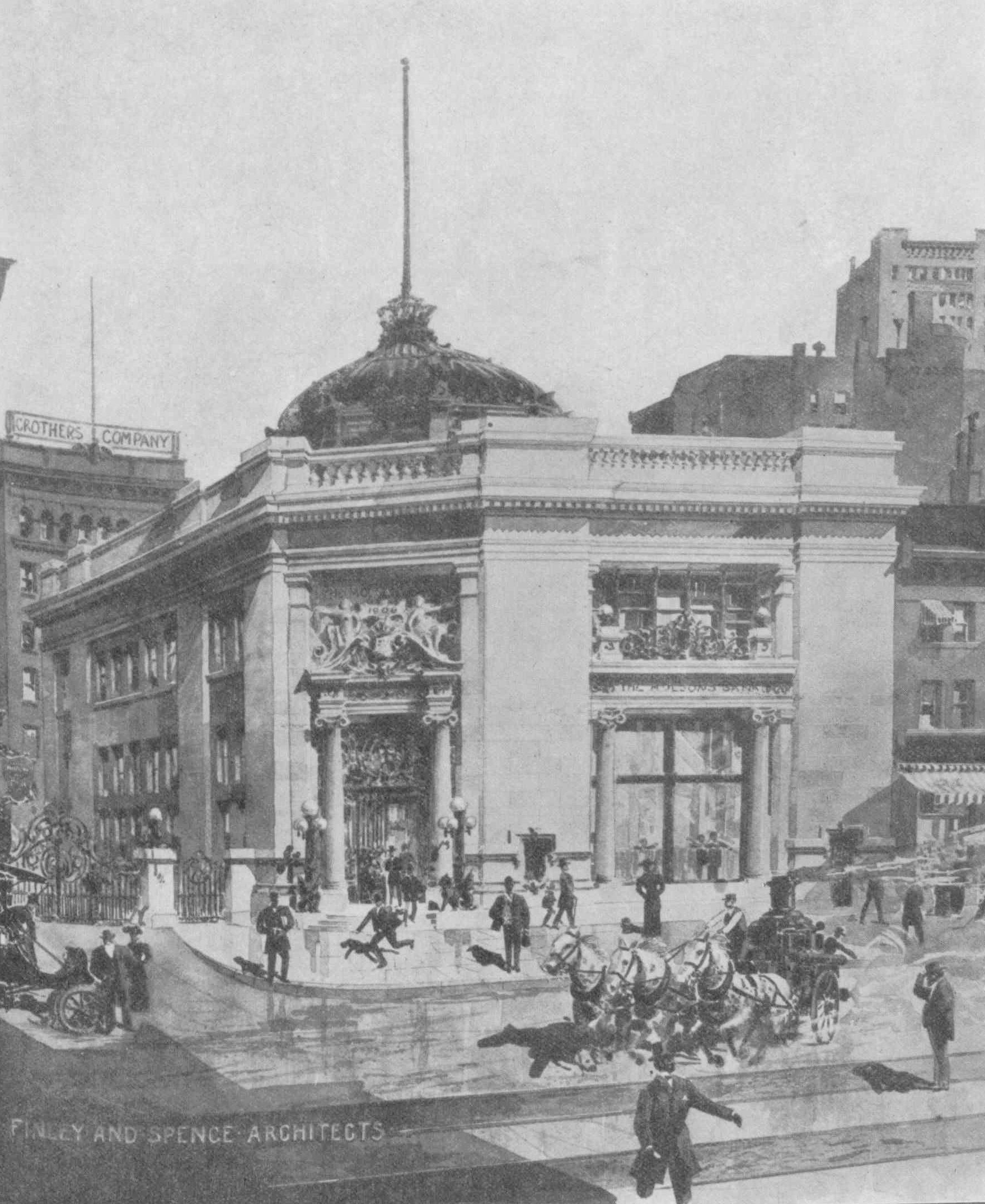
Toronto (main)

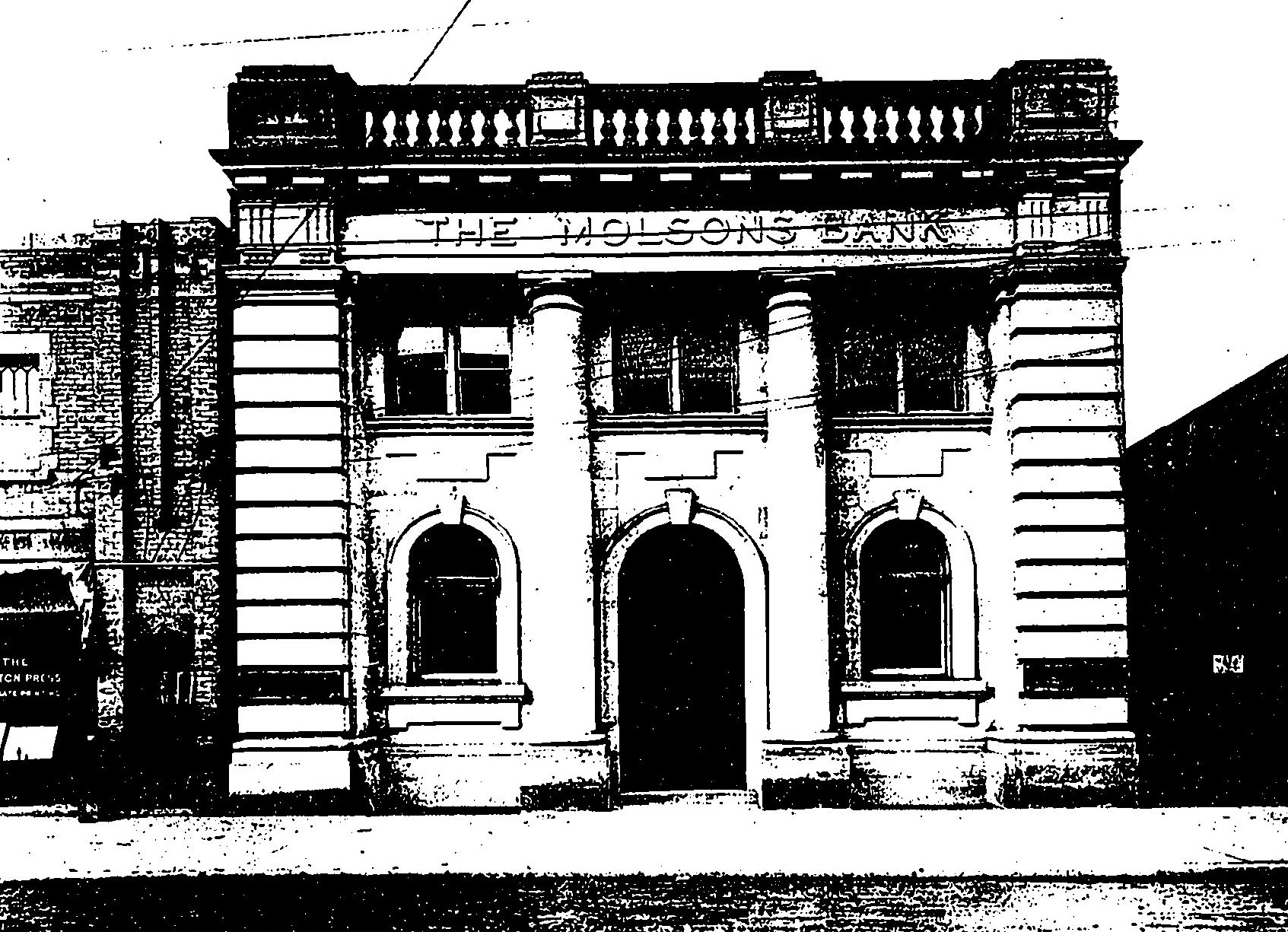
Toronto (west)

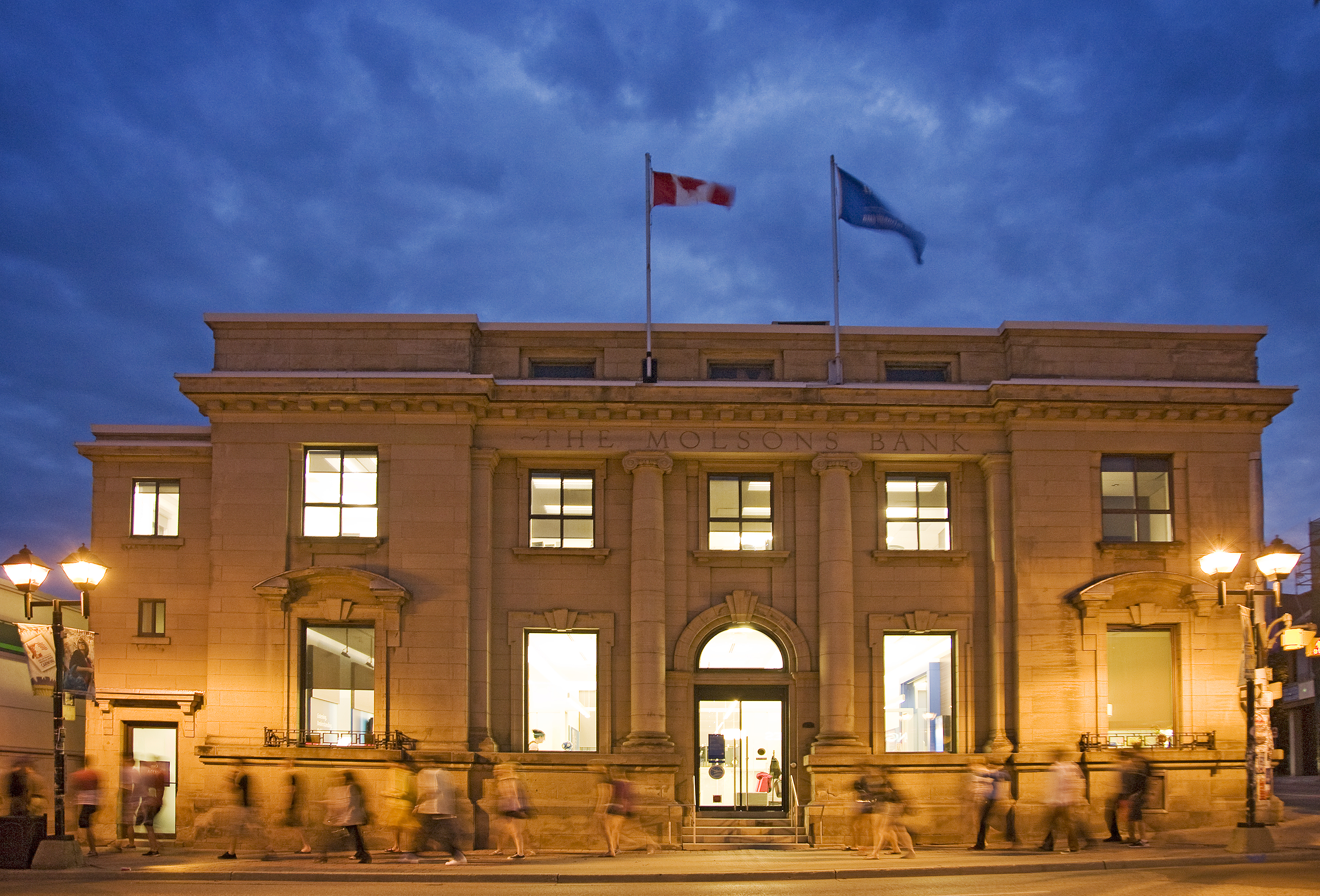
Waterloo, Ontario

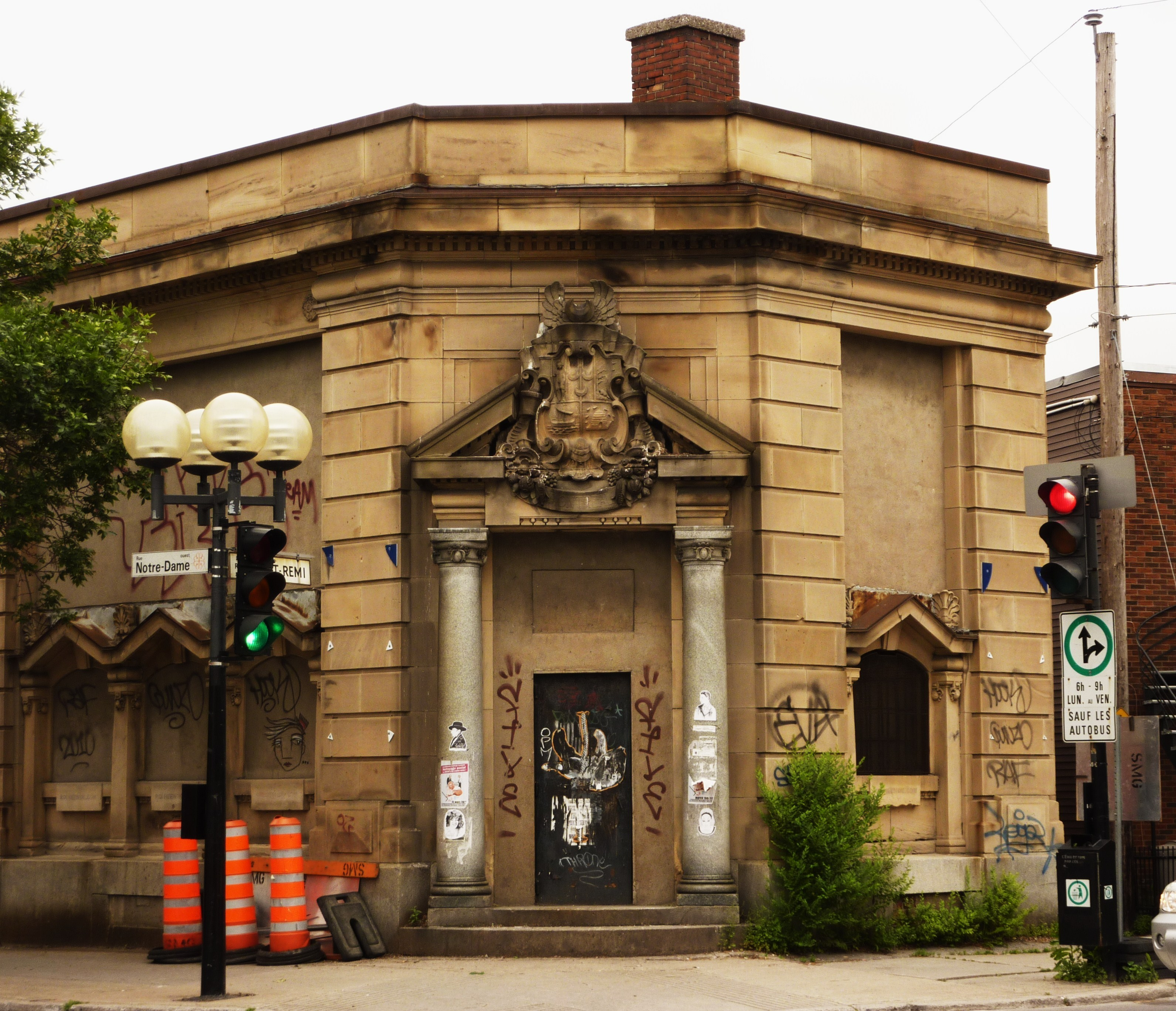
Montreal (Saint-Rémi & Notre-Dame)

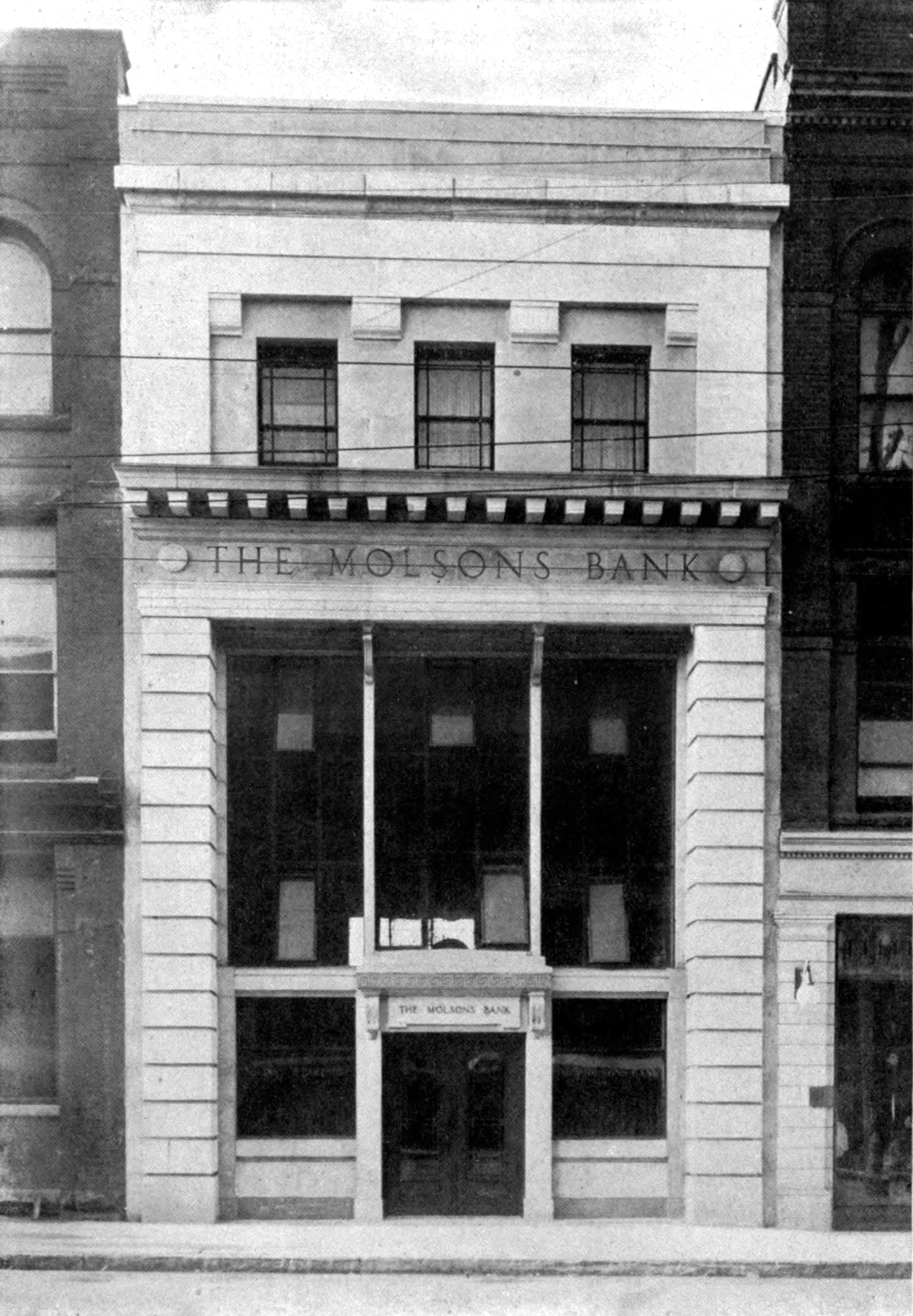
Kitchener

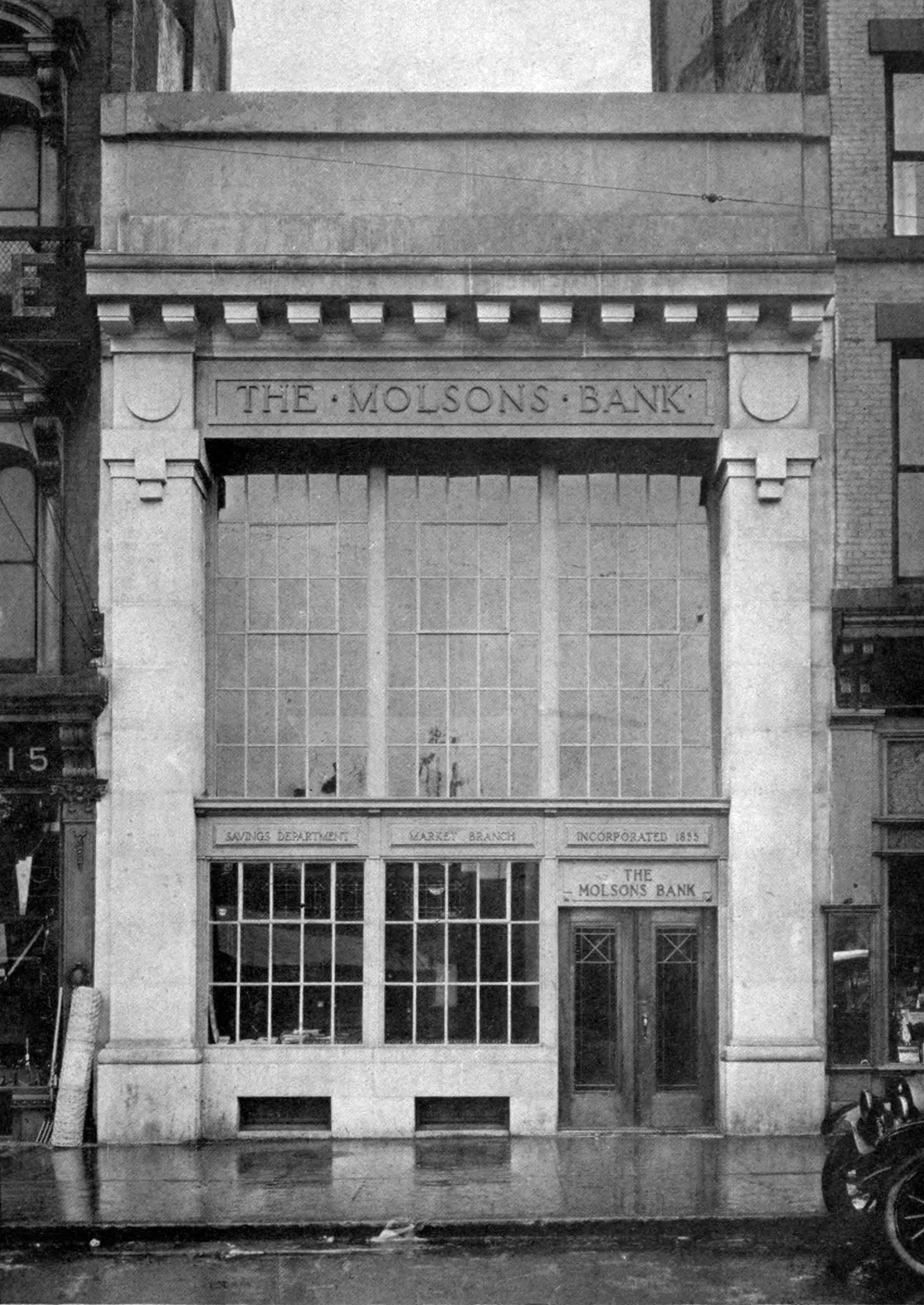
Hamilton

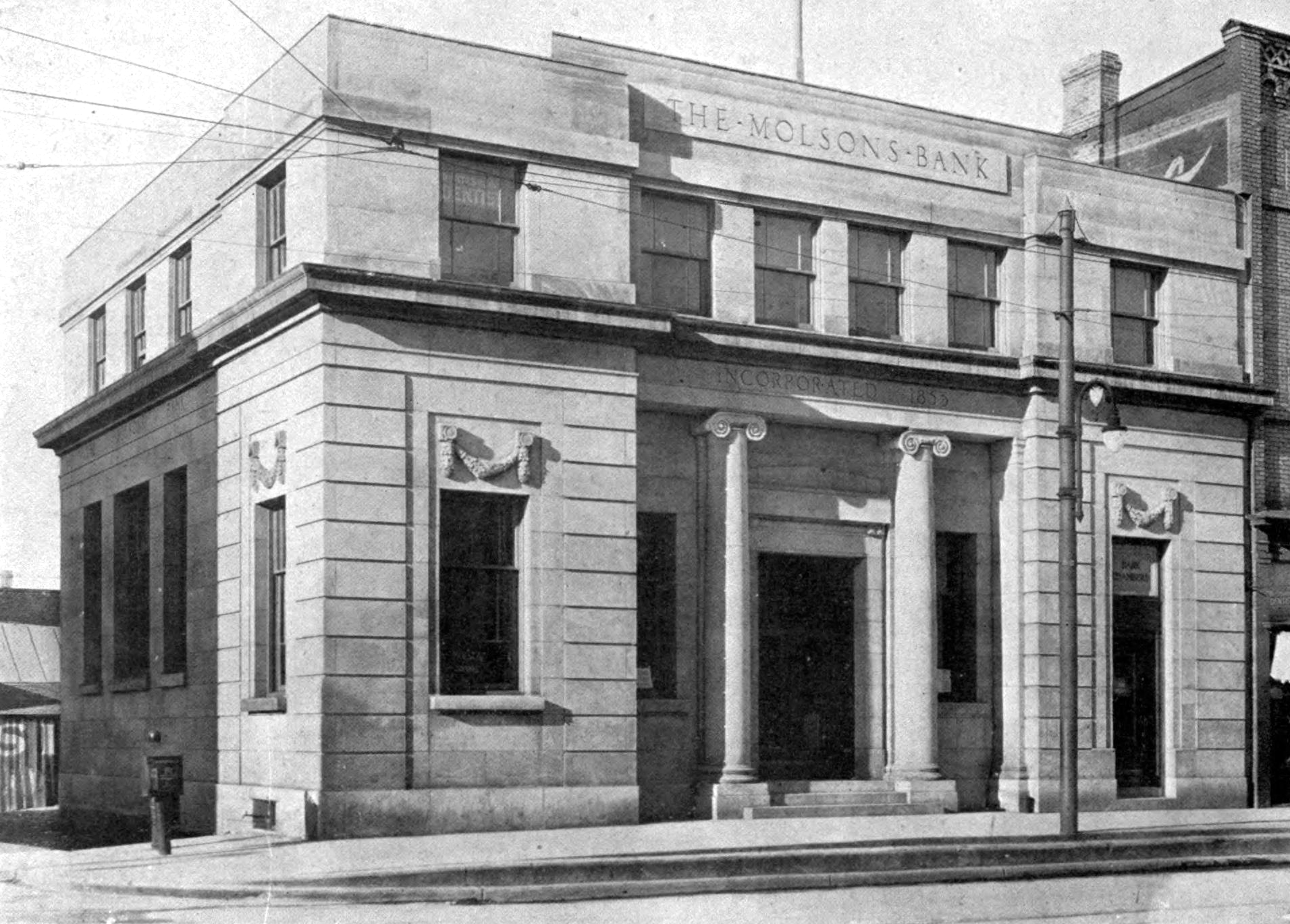
St Thomas

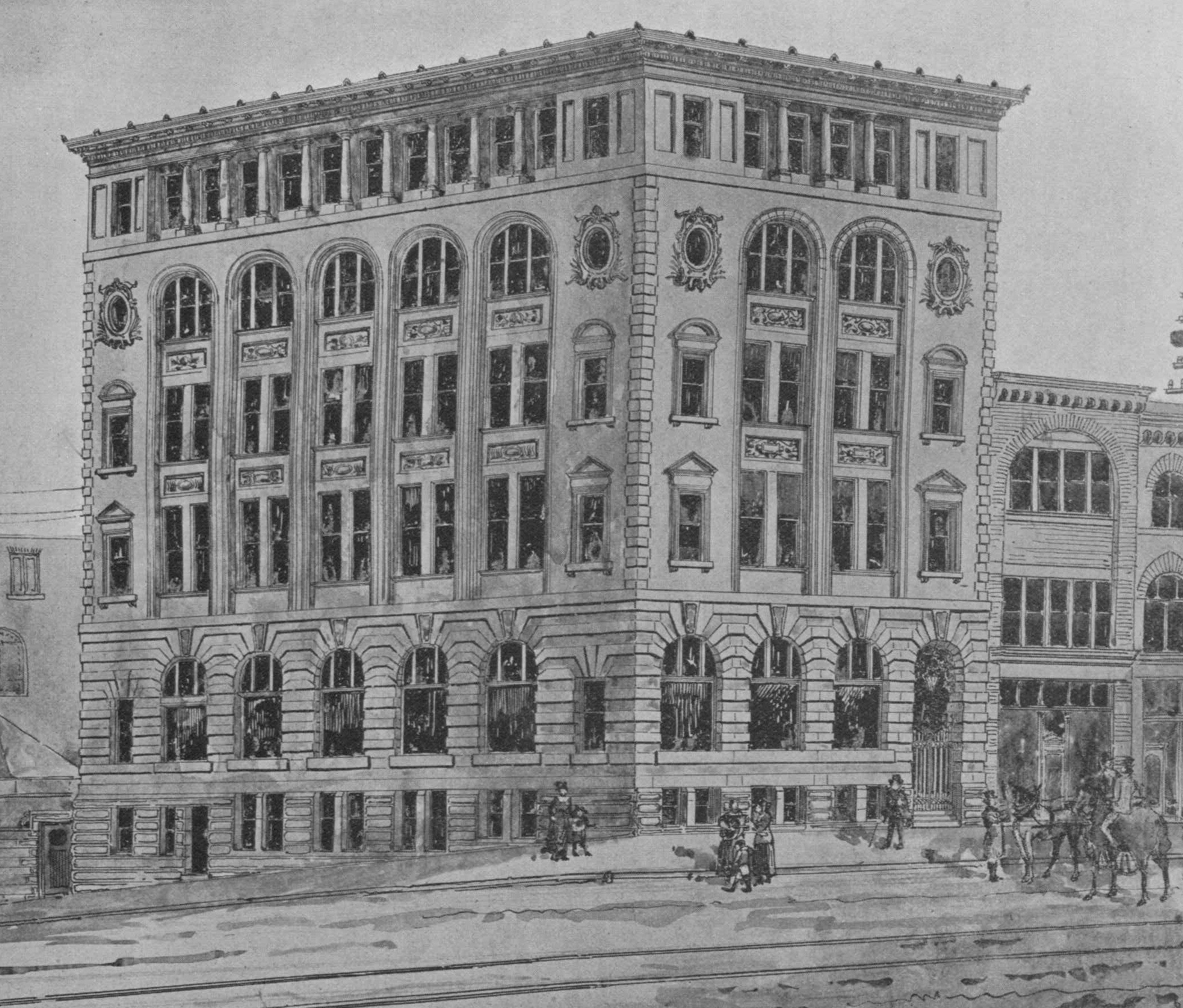
Vancouver (main)

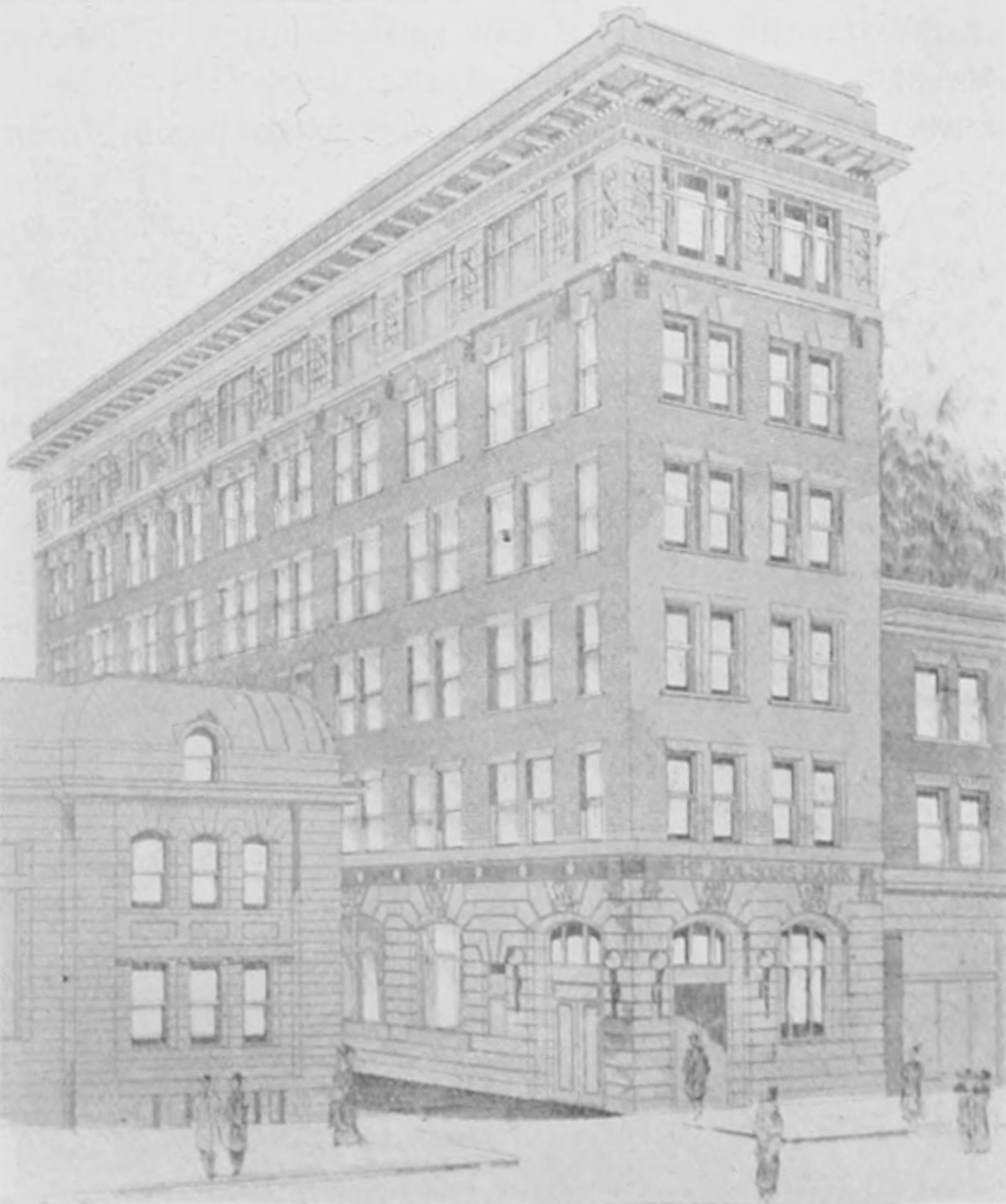
Vancouver (east end)

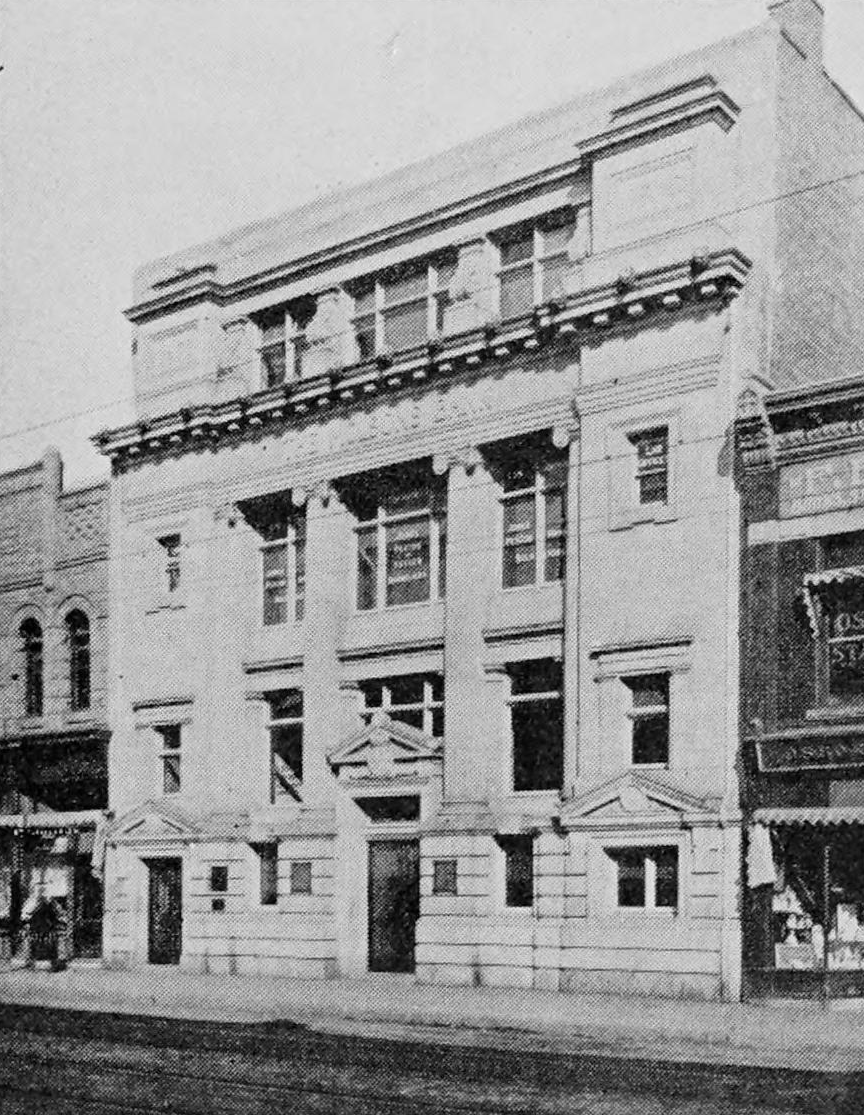
Calgary

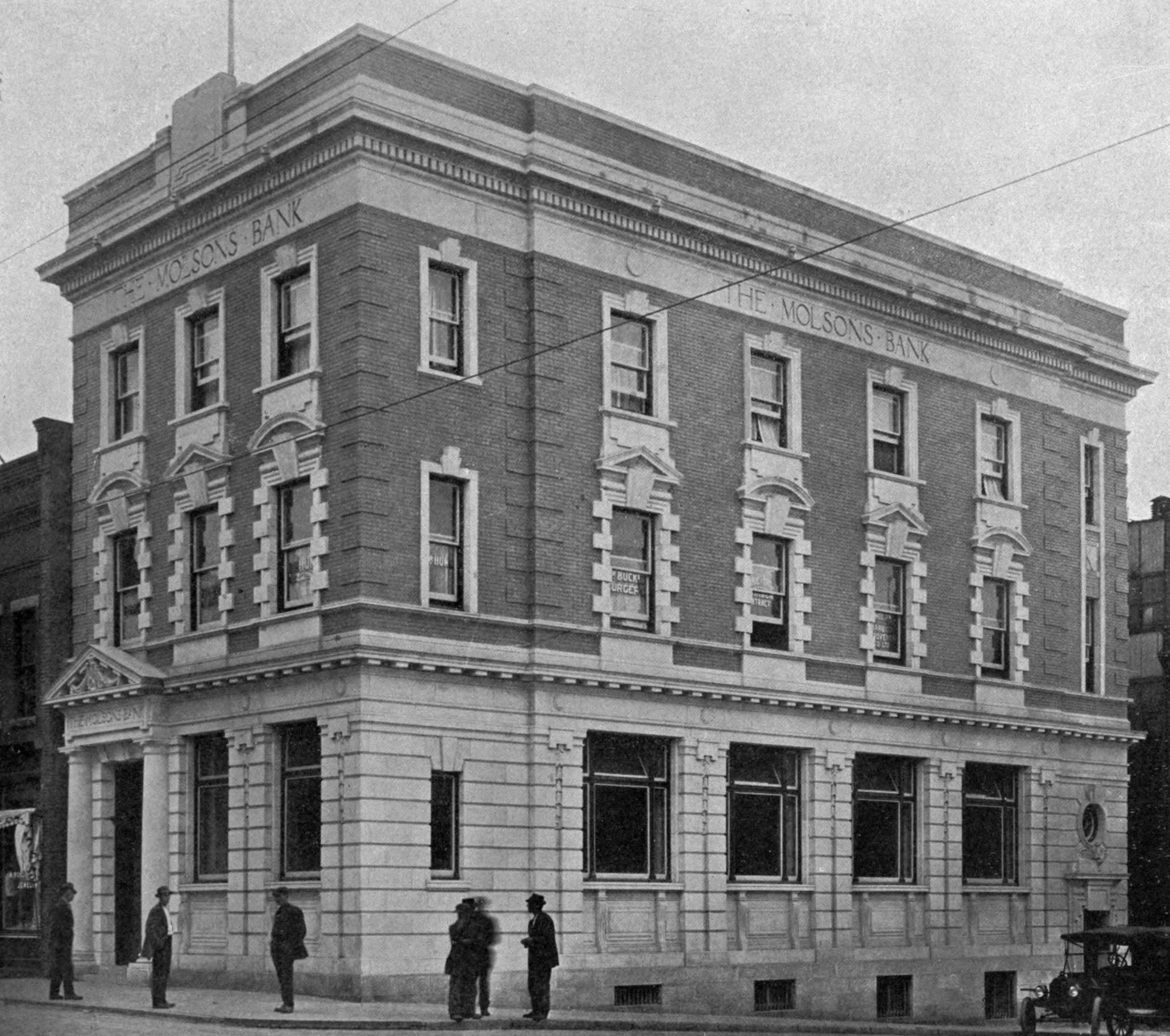
Port Arthur

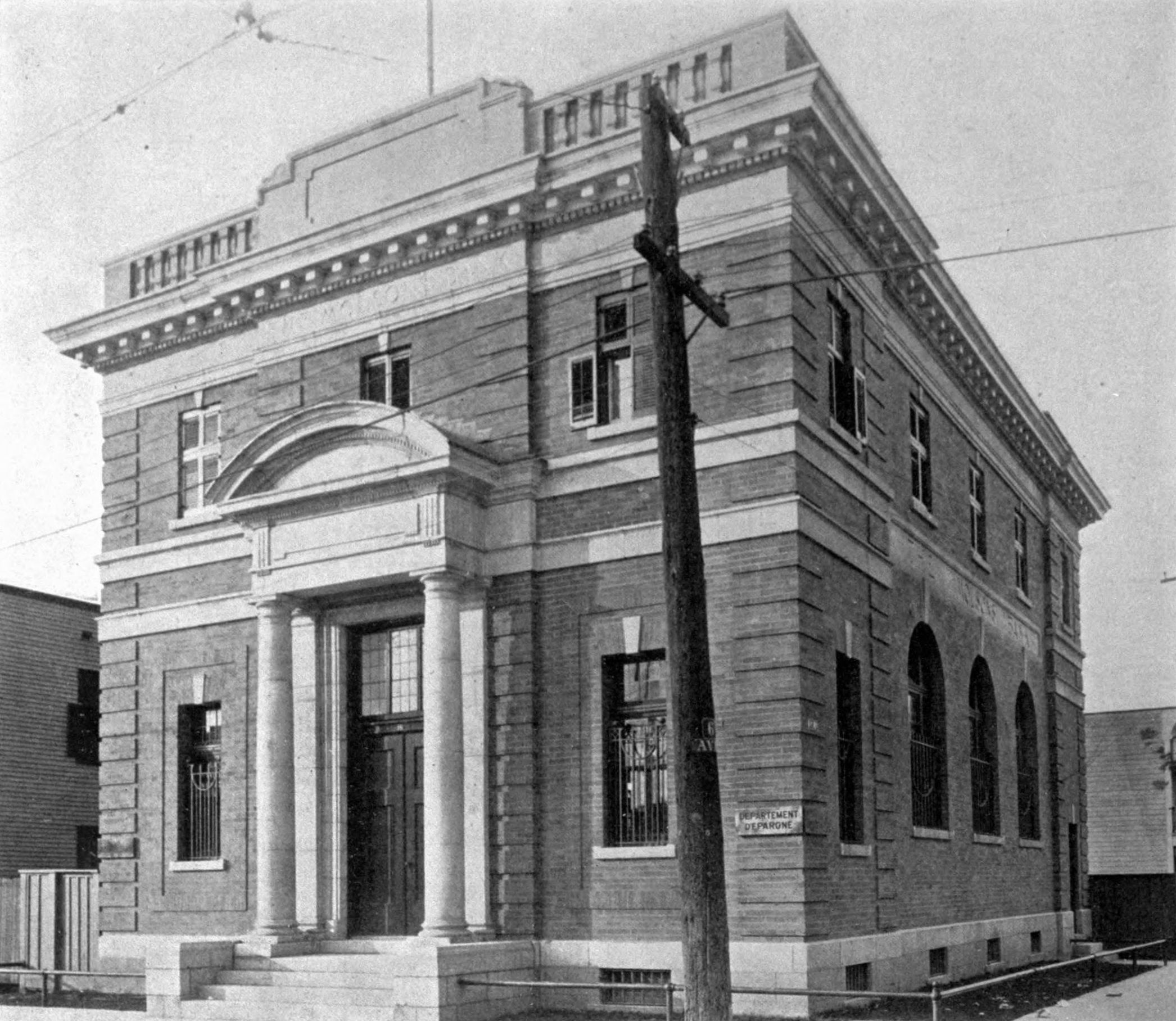
Lachine

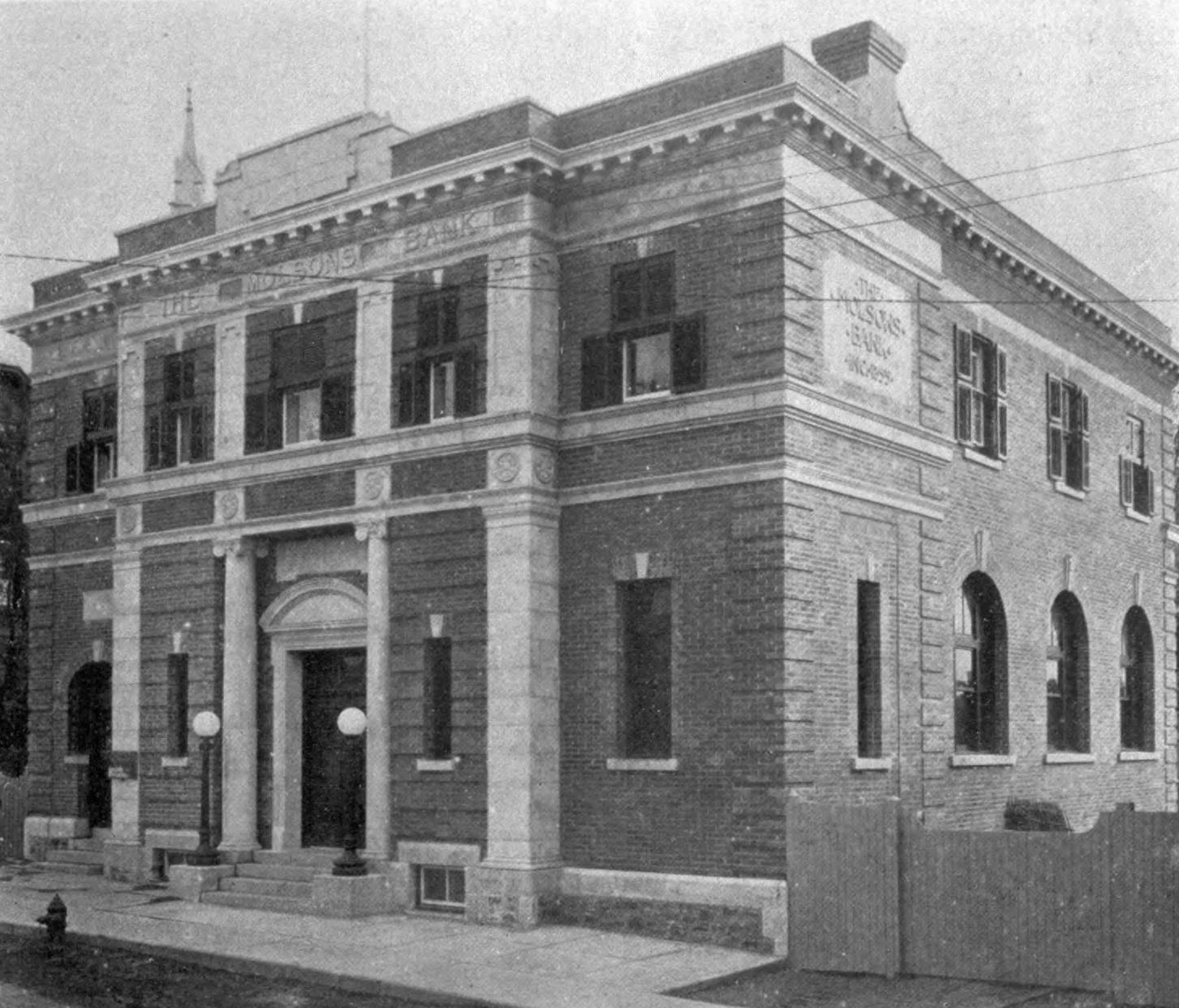
Drummondville

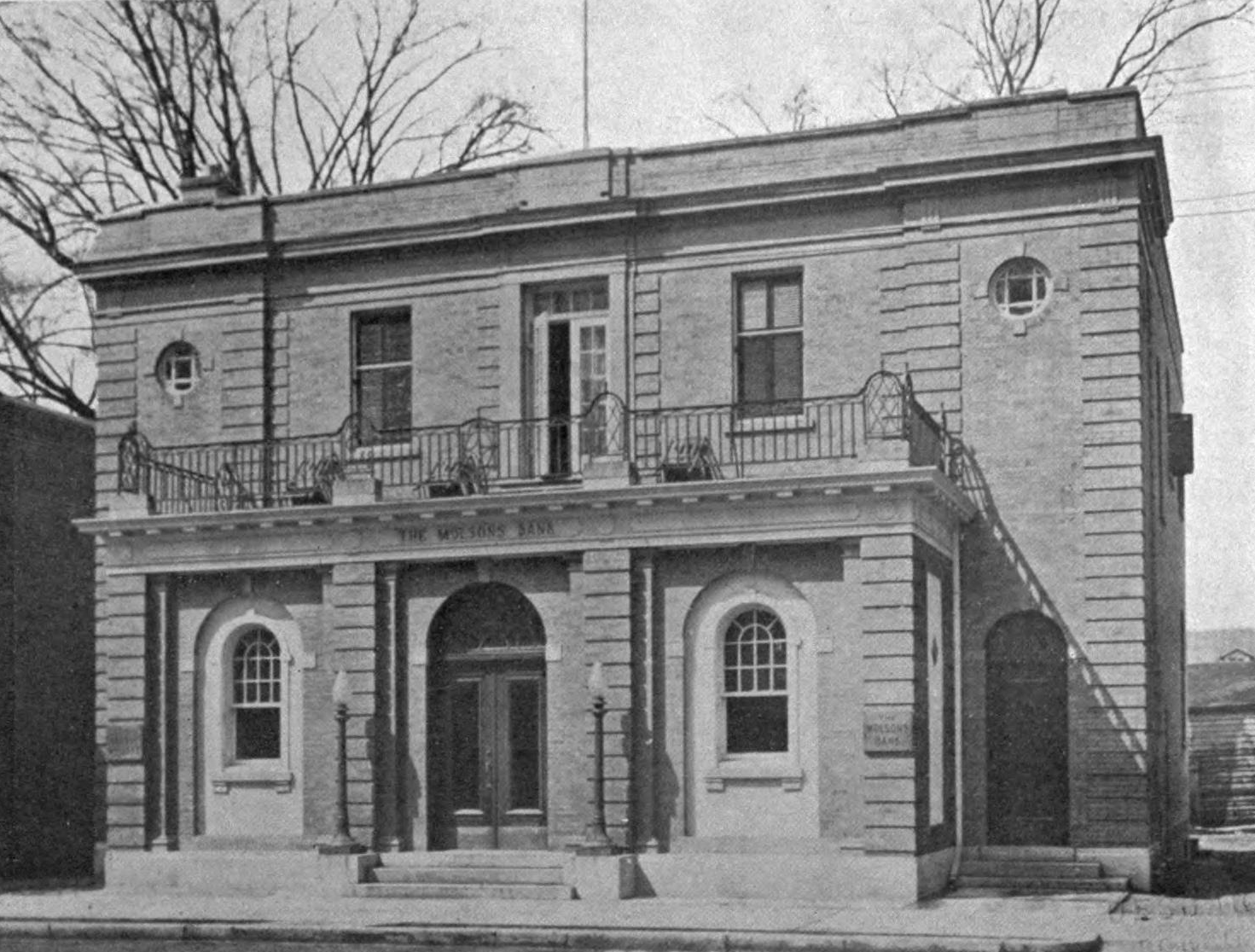
Sorel

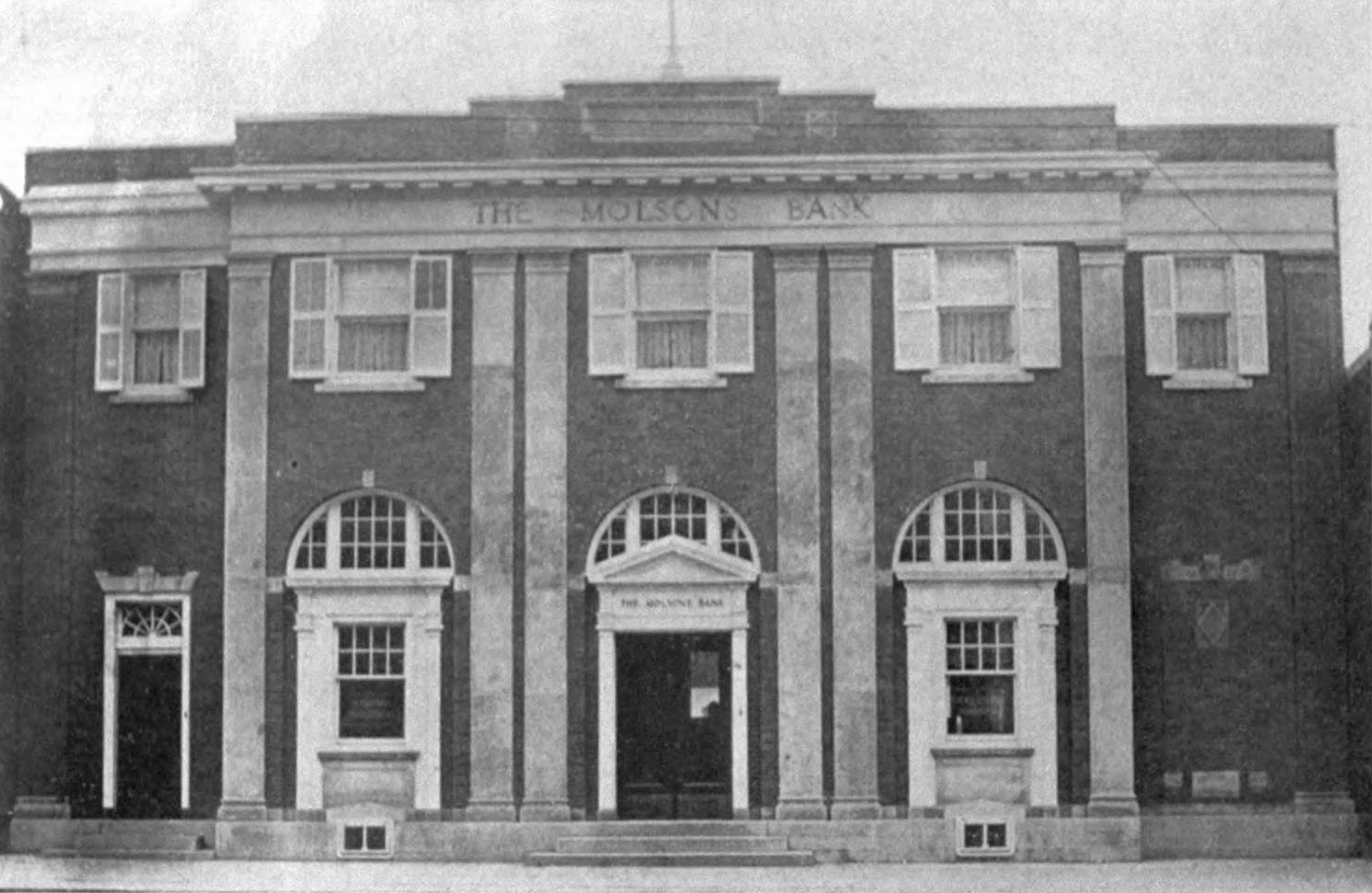
Norwich

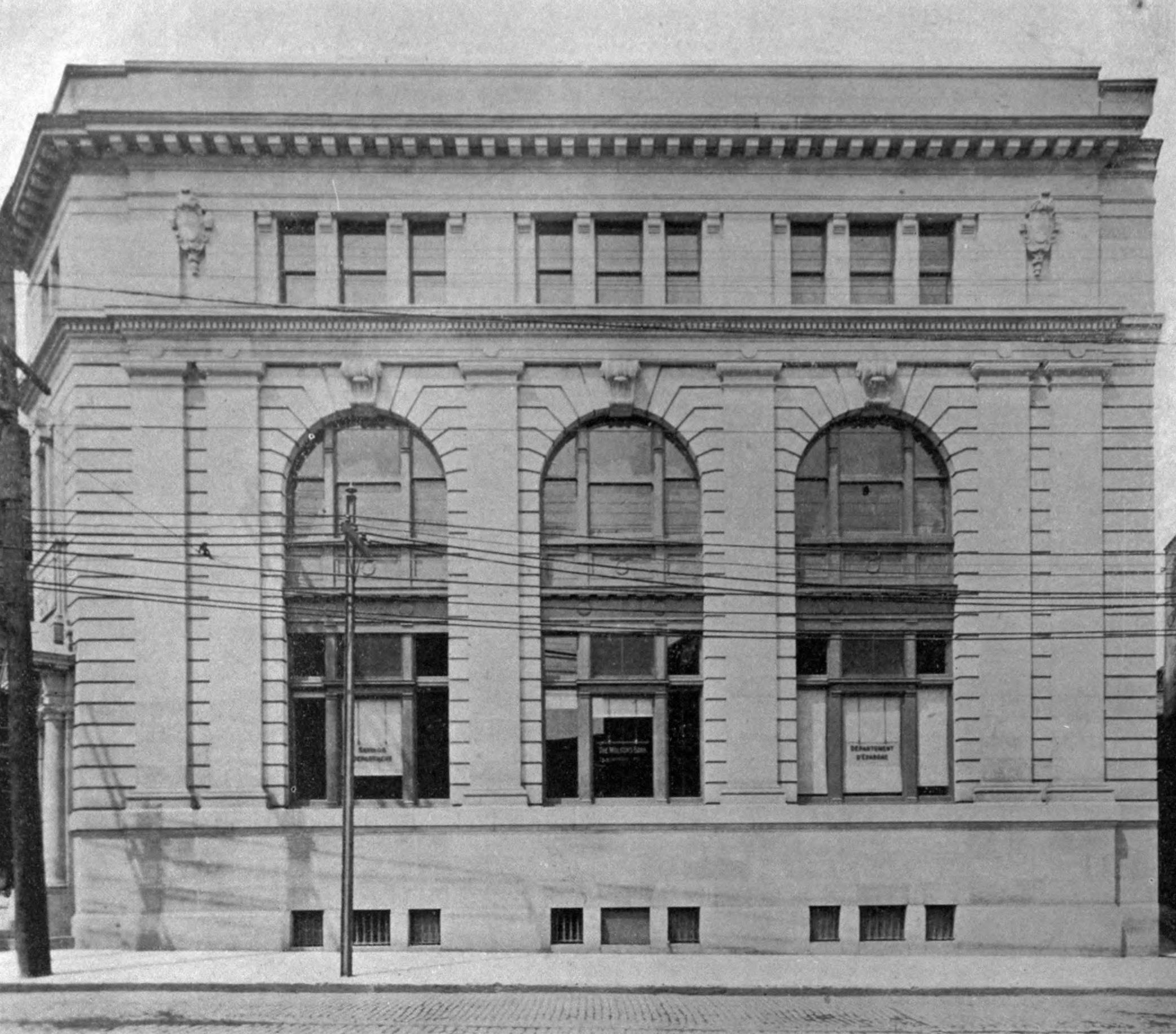
Montreal (St Lawrence & Ontario)

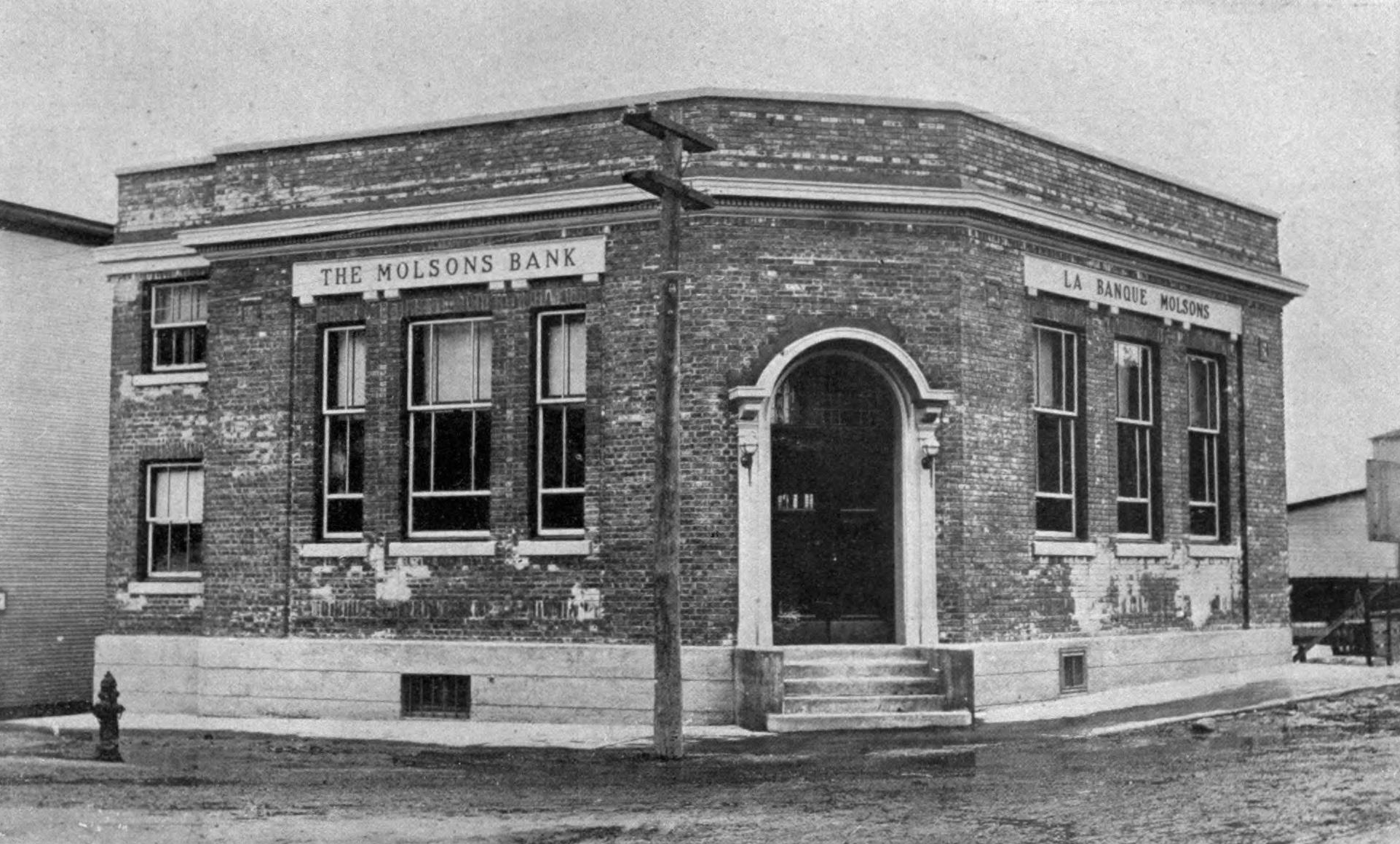
Bedford

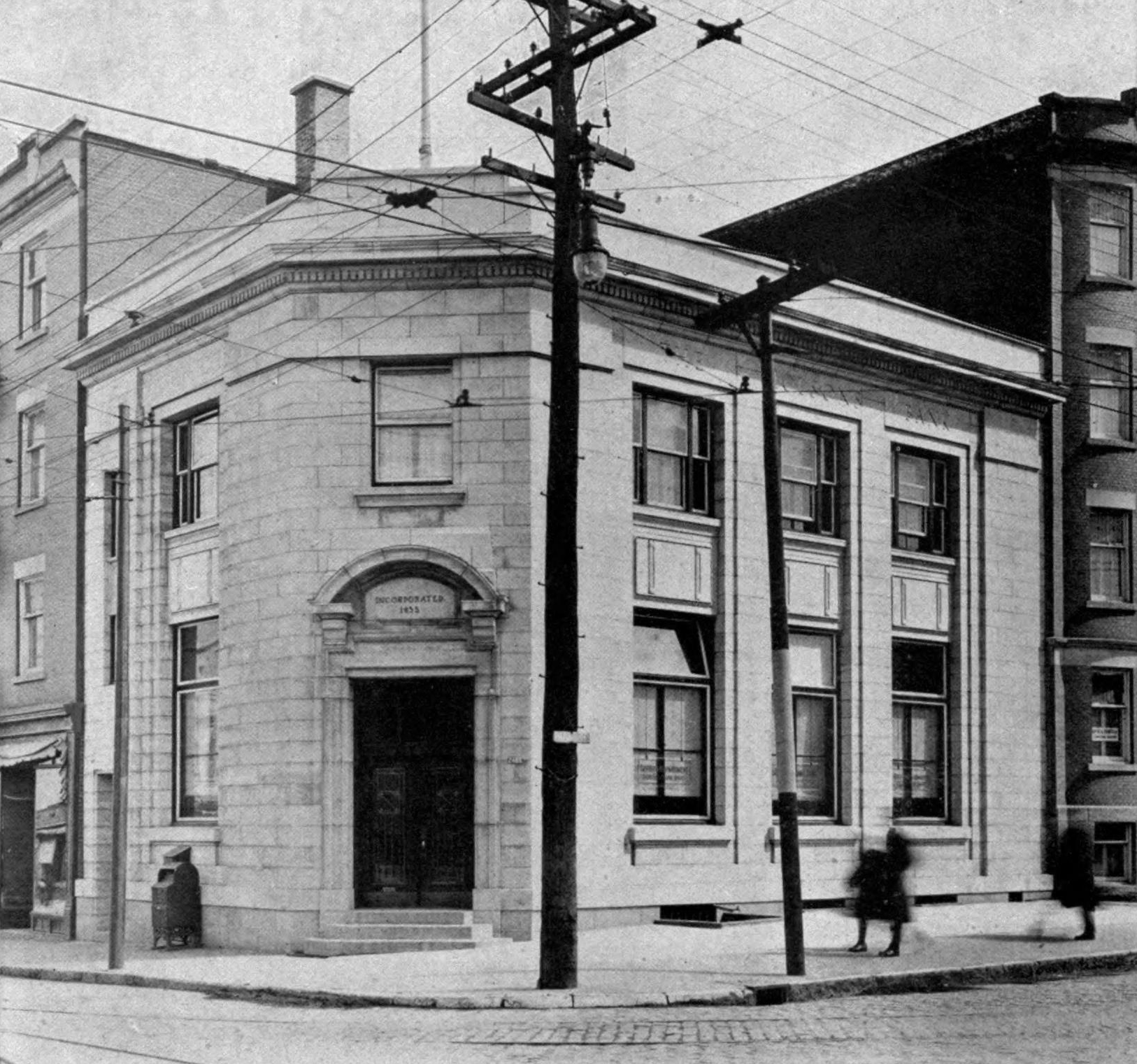
Montreal (Park & Bernard)

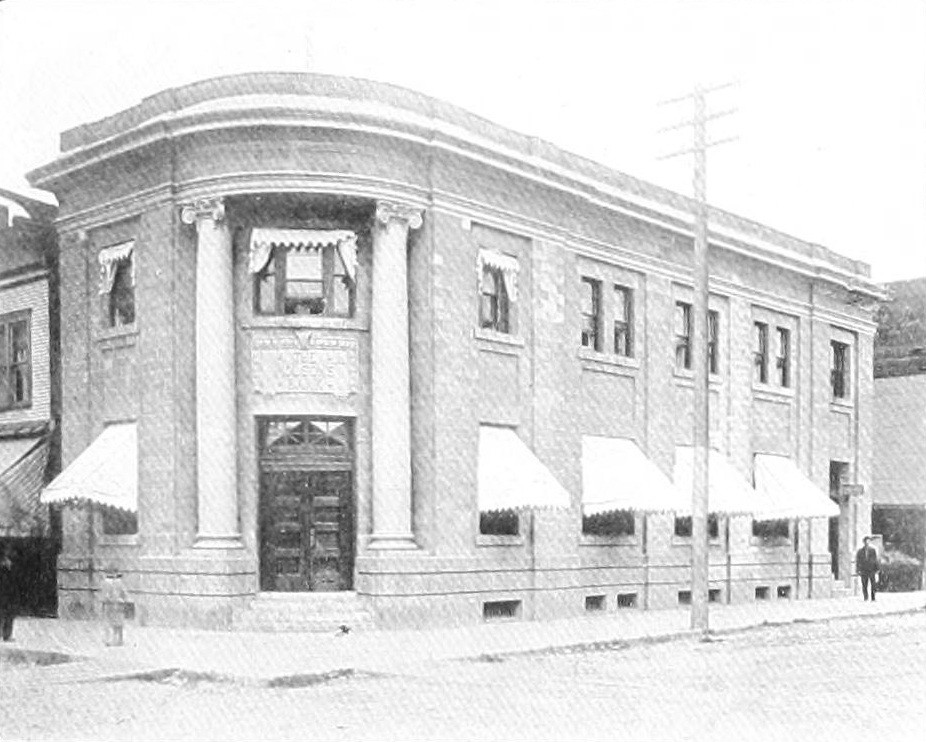
Revelstoke

== See also ==
- List of banks in Canada
- Molson Bank Building, Montreal

== Bibliography ==
- Denison, Merrill, 1893–1975. Canada's first bank : a history of the Bank of Montreal. Toronto: McClelland and Stewart, c1966. 2 v. : ill., maps, ports., (some folded, some col).; 25 cm.
