= William Molson =

Canadian businessman

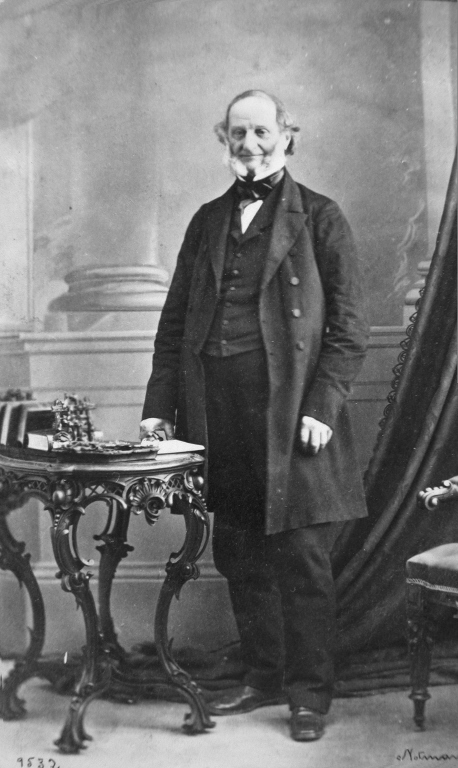
William Molson

William Molson (November 5, 1793 – February 18, 1875) was a Canadian politician, entrepreneur and philanthropist. He was the founder and President of Molson Bank, which was in 1925 absorbed by the Bank of Montreal. He was the son of the founder of the Molson family dynasty in Canadian business.

== Early life ==
Born Nov. 5th, 1793, he was the son of John Molson (1763–1836) and Sarah Insley Vaughan, and was born in Montreal, Lower Canada.

After 1828, William and his partner John Badgley were in the dry goods trade, and advertisements of iron pots, bake ovens, coal ovens, potash kettles, sheet iron and rosin were their staple, as well as foreign alcohols like Granada rum, Cognac and Bordeaux brandy. In partnership with his father, he operated the St Mary's Foundry, and did supply tools for the construction of the Rideau Canal. In 1831 the foundry was leased to Bennet & Henderson and it was the site of the furnishing of the Royal William, after her hull had been built in Quebec. William would later prove himself as more a salesman than a plant operator.

== On their own ==
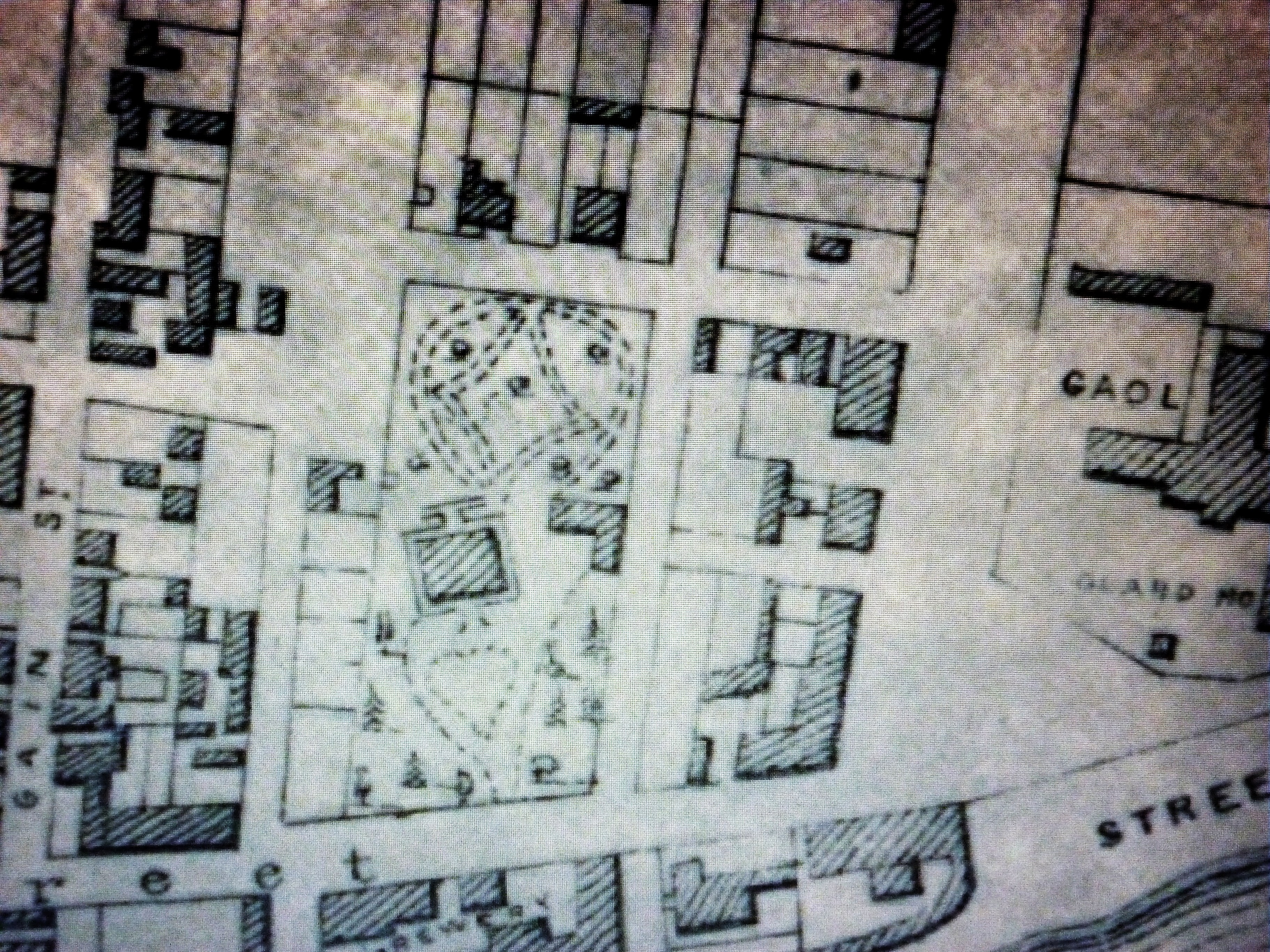
1846 - detail of urban plans: Le nom de rue Érié n'est pas mentionné ici mais son tracé est nettement représenté: il bornait au Nord, un domaine aménagé, où la famille Molson avait fait construire une résidence cossue, détruite lors du grand Incendie de 1852. À droite, on voit la prison "Au Pied du Courant" où on pendit les "Patriotes" de 1837.

On 10 January 1836, the paterfamilias died. John Molson Jr. was disinterested in the brewery business, and hence left the field to his two brothers. Thomas Molson had earlier returned in 1834 from the self-imposed exile in Kingston, Ontario, to resume and expand the distillery business. In 1836, the aftershock of the shenanigans in the financial industry south of the border caused the Canadian government to suspend specie payments (with one intermission) from 16 May 1837 to 1 June 1839, during the economic crisis of 1837 and the Upper Canada Rebellion of 1837 and again the Lower Canada Rebellion of 1838. The younger brothers Molson filled the need with banknotes printed at their expense and printed on Wall Street. The cash-starved economy return sluggishly to life and the fledgling Molson Bank was enjoined by special decree from continuing to issue paper. The Molson Bank twice was denied government approbation. In 1843, William joined the board of directors of the Bank of Montreal.

William sat on the board of directors of numerous railway companies between 1845 and 1850: the Champlain and St Lawrence Railroad Company, the Champlain and New York Railroad Company, the Montreal and New York Railroad Company, the Montreal and Champlain Railroad Company, the Lake St Louis and Province Line Railway Company, the St Lawrence and Ottawa Grand Junction Railroad Company, the St Lawrence and Atlantic Railroad Company, and the Grand Trunk Railway Company.

The distilling works themselves burnt in January 1838, and an interruption of 10 months ensued whilst it was reconstructed. While the old brewery had housed seven 3,500-gallon kettles, the eleven 25,000-gallon containers were placed in the newbuild, which grossed over the next dozen years more than £400,000. In 1844, the brothers purchased from the receivers the Handyside distillery, which was located in the vicinity of their own. The property included cow barns and a piggery, and thus it was that the Molsons engaged in cattle finishing trade, for the which they used their spent grain. At this juncture, the firm employed roughly 75 men, and needed to purchase its grain supplies in Kingston, Picton, Port Hope and other ports in Canada West. Rye whiskey had become a staple. Packaging in bottles was begun. The partnership between William and Thomas, according to which they managed the brewery, had been fixed to a ten-year term in early 1838, soon after the fire. The brothers Molson agreed to a second contract on 1 July 1848. A break clause was inserted into the new contract, whereby advance written notice was to be given if William decided to exit the brewery. He exercised that clause in 1852, and did exit on 1 July 1853. He was bound to do so if he wished to pursue a career as a banker by the legislation allowing private banks because the 1850 law forbade bankers from pursuing all other trades.

== Molson Bank ==
The official historian of the Molson firm writes that as a result of a disagreement with his brother Thomas as to the conduct of their joint distilling enterprise, William withdrew from this Molson family enterprise to establish Molson Bank in association with his brother, John Molson Jr. Founded in 1853 and chartered by the provincial legislature in 1855, it was absorbed by the Bank of Montreal in 1925. William remained its first president until his death and was succeeded by Thomas Molson's son, John Thomas Molson (1837–1910).

== Other varied activities ==
William was vice-president of the Montreal and Champlain Railway and a governor of the Montreal General Hospital (1868), being the third Molson to hold that position. Like his brother, he was a generous benefactor of McGill University, where the "William Molson Hall" was named in his honour.

== Family and legacy ==
On 7 September 1819, in the Anglican Christ Church, Montreal, Molson married Elizabeth Badgley (1799–1887), daughter of Francis Badgley (merchant) and brother to William Badgley. They had at least two children born at Quebec, one of these was Anne Molson, one of the founders of Montreal Ladies' Educational Association and the first president. The Anne Molson Gold Medal was named after her.

When he died, he had 12 grandchildren. One of his two daughters married John Molson III, who was the son of his brother, and who became the next president of his banking concern.
