= John Molson Jr. =

Canadian politician and entrepreneur (1787–1860)

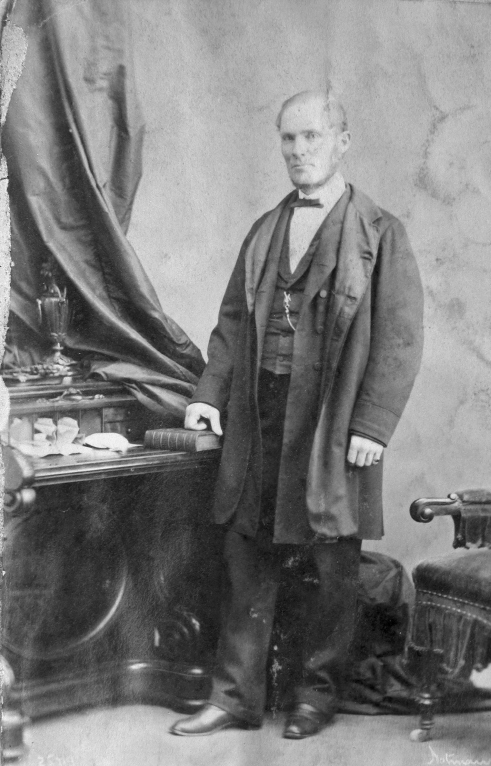
- Molson in 1867, photographed by William Notman
- Born: October 14, 1787; Montreal, Quebec, British North America
- Died: July 12, 1860 (aged 72); Montreal, Quebec, Canada
- Occupations: Politician, businessman
- Family: Molson

John Molson Jr. (October 14, 1787 – July 12, 1860) was a Canadian politician and businessman. He served as director of Molson Bank, president of the Champlain and St. Lawrence Railroad (Canada's first railway), and president of Montreal General Hospital. He was the son of the founder of the Molson family dynasty in Canadian business.

== Life ==
Molson was born on October 14, 1787 to John Molson (1763–1836) and Sarah Vaughn (1751–1829), at Montreal, Quebec. Though he was apprenticed to the brewing trade and became a partner in the family brewery in 1816, Molson was primarily a financier. The family monopoly of river transport enabled him, as owner of the Swiftsure, to engage in profitable banking operations during the War of 1812, buying bills of exchange at heavy discount in Montreal and disposing of them at a profit in Quebec. He became a director of the Bank of Montreal shortly after its foundation and was vice-president of Molson's Bank from its incorporation in 1855. He was a promoter of the Champlain and St. Lawrence Railroad, Canada's first railway, and became its president in 1837. His other interests included the first Montreal water works and gas company, fire insurance and various industrial enterprises. He succeeded his father as a life governor, vice-president and president of the Montreal General Hospital. As chairman of the Constitutional Association he fought on the government side in the Rebellions of 1837 and was wounded; he was given the rank of Lieutenant-Colonel of the militia. From 1838 to 1841, he was a member of the Special Council of Lower Canada. In 1848 he had the architect George Browne design Terra Nova, a neoclassical villa on the north side of the mountain in Côte-des-Neiges, as a retreat from the city; the house, later the home of the industrialist Sir Charles Gordon, now belongs to Saint Joseph's Oratory and houses the Petits Chanteurs du Mont-Royal.

== Marriage and children ==
In 1816, John was wed to his first cousin, Mary Anne Molson (1791–1862), daughter of Thomas Molson (1768–1803) of Lincolnshire, England, and Anne Atkinson (1765–1813). John and Mary Ann had one daughter and five sons. One of their sons, John Molson III, also married his cousin, the daughter of his father's brother William Molson, and become a president of the Molson Bank. John died on July 12, 1860, at Montreal.
