= Anna McPherson =

Canadian physicist

Anna Isobel McPherson
- Born: December 6th 1901; Montreal, QC, Canada
- Died: 1979
- Education: McGill University (B.A., M.Sc.), University of Chicago (Ph.D)
- Known for: Ana I. McPherson Lecture Series
- Scientific career
- Fields: Atomic, Nuclear and Medical Physics
- Workplaces: McGill University
- Thesis: Doppler effect in spectra of positive rays of uniform velocity in argon, neon, helium (1933)
- Academic advisors: Arthur Eve (M.Sc.), A.J. Dempster (Ph.D.)

Anna Isobel McPherson (1901–1979) was a Canadian physicist and the first female professor in the Department of Physics at McGill University.

== Early life and education ==
McPherson received a B.A. degree in Mathematics and Physics with First Class Honors from McGill University in 1921. There she received the Anne Molson Gold Medal for excellence, awarded to the best student in physics, mathematics, and physical science at McGill.

In 1923, McPherson received a M.Sc. from McGill, under the supervision of Arthur Eve. Her master's research project attempted to develop a new method to measure the dose of X-rays received in medical applications.

She then taught mathematics at a high school in Montreal, before moving to Chicago to begin a doctorate degree with A.J. Dempster at the University of Chicago. There she worked to analyze the spectrum of electrical discharges in gasses. She received a PhD 1933.

== Career ==
After finishing her graduate studies, she returned to Montreal and repeatedly applied to and was rejected for a teaching position at McGill. She was eventually hired as a part-time demonstrator at the university in 1940. Shortly after, she became an instructor in a wartime program that trained radio mechanics. In 1943 she became a sessional lecturer and later that year became a full-time lecturer. She was promoted to assistant professor in 1947 and an associate professor in 1954, becoming the first female professor in the Department of Physics at McGill. While she was widely regarded as an excellent teacher, her heavy teaching load left little time for research, and her lack of publications meant she was never promoted to full professor. She became an honorary visiting professor when she retired in 1970, a position she held until her death in November 1979.

After her death, she donated a large sum of money to the university with the stipulation that it be used to support medical and physics reach at McGill. The Department of Physics continues to use the revenue from this endowment to support physics research. In 1983, a portion of the funds were used to establish the Anna I. McPherson Lectures in Physics, a lecture series that brings distinguished physicists to McGill to give a public and a technical lecture, as well as meet with staff and students. The small observatory on the roof of the Ernest Rutherford Physics Building is also named in her honour.
