= John Molson =

18th and 19th-century Canadian businessman

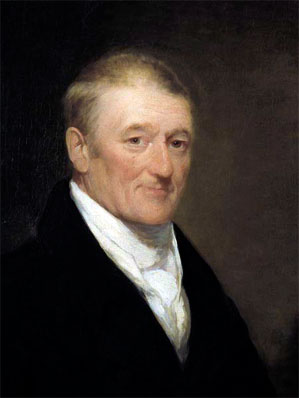
- Born: 28 December 1763; Moulton, Lincolnshire, England
- Died: 11 January 1836 (aged 72); Boucherville, Lower Canada
- Resting place: Mount Royal Cemetery
- Occupation: Brewer
- Military Service
- Allegiance: Lower Canada
- Branch: Canadian Militia
- Service years: 1812-13
- Rank: Captain
- Unit: 5th Select Embodied Militia
- Conflicts: War of 1812

John Molson (28 December 1763 – 11 January 1836) was an English-born brewer and entrepreneur in colonial Quebec, which during his lifetime became Lower Canada. In addition to founding Molson Brewery, he is known for building the first Canadian steamship and the first public Canadian railway. He was a president of the Bank of Montreal, and established a hospital, a hotel, and a theatre in Montreal. Molson was also the "leader" (provincial grand master) of the freemason's lodge of Montreal from 1826 to 1833. His business dynasty, much of which he passed along to and was expanded by his family, continues to remain influential in Canada.

== Early life ==
John Molson was born in 1763, in the parish of Moulton near Spalding, Lincolnshire, England. His father John Molson senior (1730–1770) had, in 1760, married Mary Elsdale (1739–1772), the eldest daughter of Samuel Elsdale (1704–1788), of Surfleet. Her brother, Robinson Elsdale (1744–1783), was a privateer, whose unpublished exploits formed the basis of the novel by Frederick Marryat, The Privateersman (1846). Before the marriage, John Molson senior inherited a property known as Snake Hall, in Moulton Eaugate which consisted of a house and various outbuildings associated with 38 acres (15 ha) of land.

John Molson senior died on 4 June 1770. His will bequeathed properties to his wife and five surviving children. Under their marriage settlement, Snake Hall went to Mary, and was to then pass on to his eldest son, John, upon her death. She died on 21 September 1772, and thus John was orphaned when eight years old. John senior had named four guardians and trustees for the estate; the young John Molson's financial affairs were overseen by his paternal uncle, Thomas Molson, but in September 1771 Thomas turned over the duties of trustee and guardian to Samuel Elsdale, possibly due to poor health, as he died the following spring. Under Samuel Elsdale's oversight, Snake Hall was rented out to the benefit of their trusts. John went to live with a man named William Robinson, and at age 12 in 1776 was consigned to the care of a Mr Whitehead, who was paid for his board and education until 1780, when he turned 16. Writers have criticized Samuel Elsdale for his oversight but he seems to have performed his duties prudently, although John Molson plainly chafed under his guardianship.

In 1782, at the age of 18, Molson immigrated to Quebec, in a ship that was leaking so badly he switched ships mid-ocean. In 1783, Molson moved into the home of Thomas Loid just outside Montreal, who had begun brewing beer the previous year. Molson became a partner in the brewery and took over on 5 January 1785, eight days after he had turned twenty-one. In 1786, he returned briefly to England, and it was during that year that Molson picked up the book Theoretic Hints on an Improved Practice in Brewing by John Richardson. Molson returned to Quebec with more money and a new mindset. Many Loyalists were immigrating to Quebec from the United States and this influx increased the demand for beer. Molson worked hard, staying up long into the night. He hired an apprentice, Christopher Cook, and a loyalist housemaid, Sarah Insley Vaughan. He married her on 7 April 1801 at Christ Church in Montreal after she had borne him three children.

Sarah (1751–1829) was the daughter of Thomas Vaughan of Harnham Hall, Morpeth, Northumberland. She was the niece of Wilmot Vaughan, 1st Earl of Lisburne and through her mother's family, the Aynsleys, a cousin of the Duke of Atholl. She emigrated to the American colonies with her first husband, David Tetchley, but ten years later left him, and reverting to her maiden name, she made her way to Montreal, penniless, until taken in by Molson.

Soon Molson's beer was in such demand that according to one of his diary entries "Cannot serve half my customers and they are increasing every day." One of the major reasons for this was the wide appeal of his beer to different classes of Montreal society. High British officers had been drinking imported London porters and the city merchants preferred Bristol. Yet Molson's beer was special as it was "universally liked" (a quotation from Molson's diary). It was at the Anglican church that he met many influential and wealthy businessmen like fur trader James McGill, Joseph Frobisher, founder of the North West Company, and Alexander Mackenzie.

== Career success and later life ==
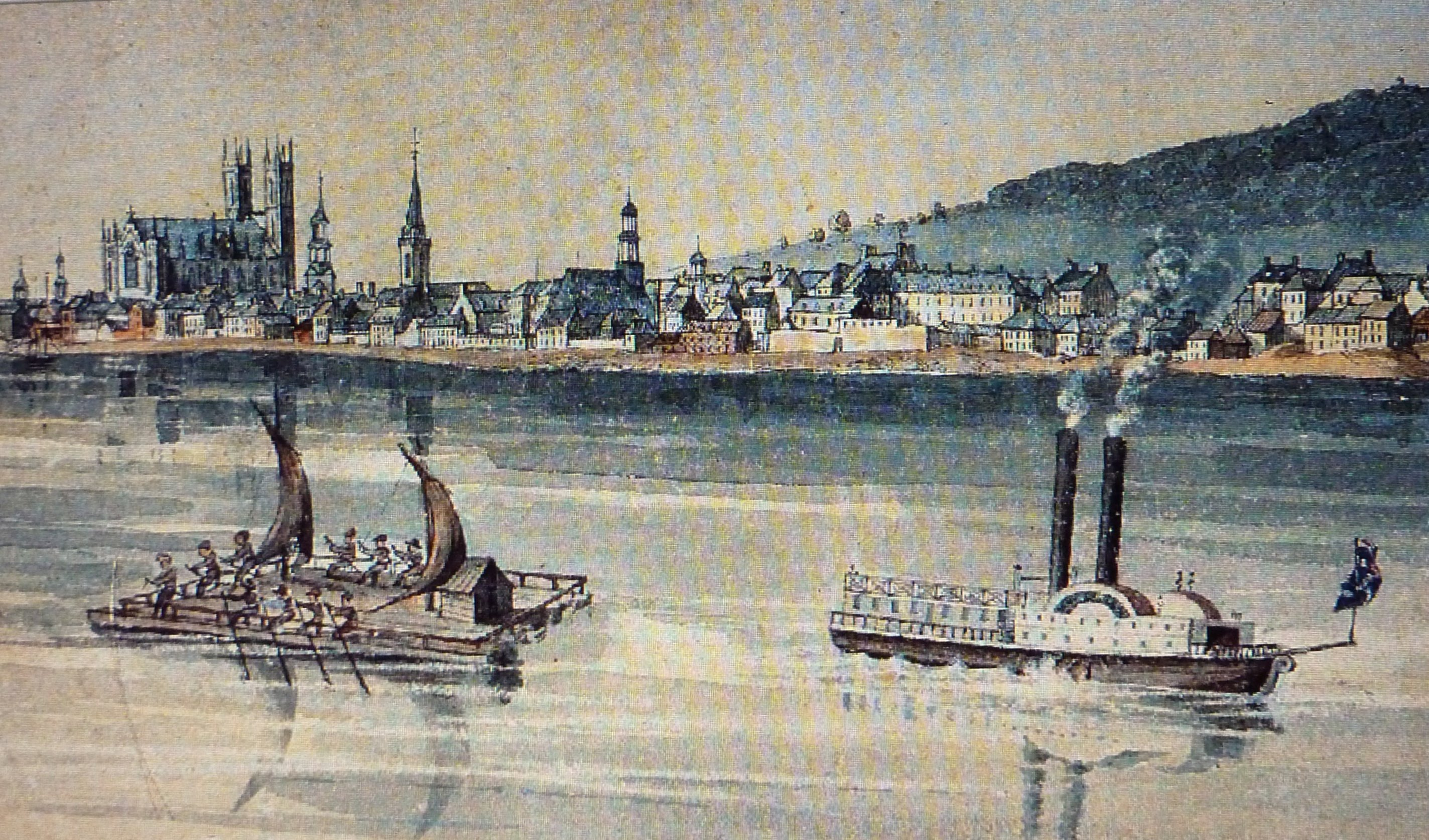
Montréal around 1830 with "cagers" and steam boats in the foreground. Cagers were large rafts made of logs attached to each other on which the boatmen installed a cabin or "cage". They descended the river as far as Molson dock. Seen from Sainte-Hélène island.

Between 1788 and 1800, Molson's business grew quickly into one of the larger ones in Lower Canada. Already in 1791, he sold 30,000 gallons of beer. During these years Molson and his wife had four children, John junior, Thomas (who died shortly after birth), another Thomas, and William (Billy).

The year 1800 marks the first recorded use of (imported) bottles by Molson. About this time arrived The Philosophical Principles of the Science of Brewing by Richardson, which marks the introduction of the thermometer and the saccharometer to the English craft. By the start of the 19th Century, his small brewery had grown tenfold. Molson now had the money to improve his business by buying new technology.

=== Steamship pioneer ===
Molson toyed with the idea of buying a steamship after seeing Robert Fulton's Clermont go down the Hudson.. However, there was also another steamship commissioned by a group of businessmen from Burlington, Vermont, in 1808 to be built by two brothers in Burlington, Vermont, named John and James Winans. This ship was quite unsurprisingly called the Vermont and went into service in 1809. The Vermont ran in modern Canada, along Lake Champlain and the Riviere Richelieu to Dorchester (modern day Saint-Jean-sur-Richelieu in Quebec). Molson's steamship would be the first in Canada. Molson teamed up with John Jackson and John Bruce who would build a ship for Molson in return for putting up the money and part ownership. Built in Montreal (with engines produced at Forges du Saint-Maurice in Trois-Rivières) in 1809, Accommodation became the first steamship to ride on the waters of the Saint Lawrence River. This was a great feat for Molson but, from a business viewpoint, it was a net loss, costing £4000 by 1810. Molson was determined to make money on his ships so he dismantled Accommodation and purchased in person two steamship engines from Boulton & Watt in Birmingham, England. He combined the two engines and the remains of Accommodation to create Swiftsure, a magnificent ship that was a vision of elegance and speed, traversing the route at an average of seven miles an hour. Swiftsure measured 130 feet on the keel and had a beam of 24 feet. The steamship provided a ready cash business, while the government in London had suspended the transfer of specie from 1800 to 1817. Most other Canadian business was carried on with London bills of exchange, and the transfer of those bills from Montreal to Quebec earned the Molsons up to 20 per cent. And since brewing occupied the months when the steamboats were laid up, a harmonious concordance of activities resulted.

Molson would have three other steamships constructed and utilized close to the end of the War of 1812 (for the first ship) and following the end of the war (for the remaining two), these ships were called: the Malsham (an archaic form of Molson) built in 1814 (going into service in September immediately after construction), the Lady Sherbrooke in 1816, and the New Swiftsure in 1817.

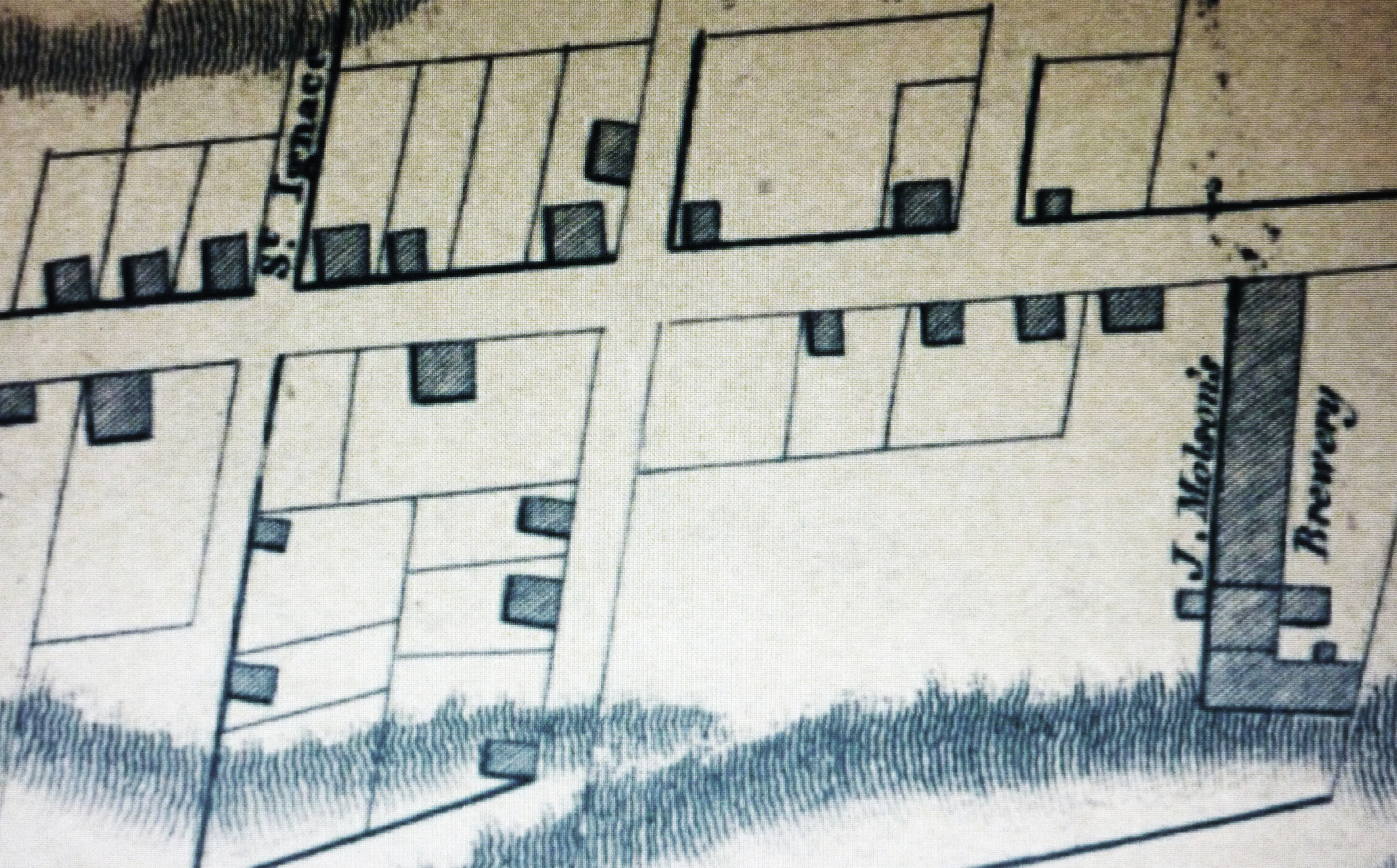
1815: The details of this map show the facilities of the industrialist John Molson in the Eastern part of the old suburb of Québec in the first quarter of the 19th century. (detail of urban plans map)

During the time leading up to the War of 1812 and within the war itself, Molson's business continued to grow and his sales were pushed even higher. Swiftsure was leased to the British Army and brought in a supplemental income.

Molson himself would be involved in the war, albeit through a full-time militia and not a regular force; however, some troops in the militia that Molson was a part of were volunteers and some were still conscripted. Each volunteer or conscripted man was nonetheless required to serve for one year only. Molson was ranked a lieutenant in the 5th Battalion of the Select Embodied Militia. There were 8 different battalion units in this militia with all expect for the 6th seeing action in either the Montreal or Lake Champlain sectors of the war front. The 5th Battalion was the first battalion that was formed after the War of 1812 had been declared officially, with the first four having been formed already in 1812 before the war began. Seven of the eight battalions (all except the 3rd) would be perpetuated within the Canadian Army and assigned to a varying regiment within - the 5th Battalion of which Molson was in was assigned to the Black Watch (Royal Highland Regiment) of Canada. Molson would eventually be promoted to captain on 25 March 1813. Molson would resign from this commissioned work within the same year, on 25 November 1813.

In 1815, Molson was elected to represent Montreal East in the legislative assembly on the platform of building a wharf. Molson Brewery is the second oldest company in all of Canada.

=== Plutocrat and banker ===
As Molson became more occupied by his multiple businesses and his seat in the assembly, his three sons began to take a much larger role in the companies. John Junior managed the steamships, Thomas was married in England and would frequently travel sending back tips and advice to his father, and William was in charge of the brewery. In 1816, the year he took his sons formally into partnership, Molson built Mansion House Hotel which coincided with the Assembly's acceptance of the wharf. Molson's hotel was only for those who could afford luxury. The hotel offered Montreal's first library, boat rides on the river, well-furnished rooms and six-course dinners, famous throughout all of Montreal.

To the John Molsons and Sons partnership were leased at 6% per annum Molson's accumulated capital assets; the term was seven years. The four partners divided equally, share and share alike, the profits and the losses. If any insoluble difference arose between the partners, two indifferent arbitrators were to be appointed. By December 1816, Molson had accumulated £63,550.

In 1817, John Richardson and George Moffatt created the Montreal Bank. Molson declined a partnership in it as the backers of this project had been involved with multiple failed banks in the United States and he felt it was a risky investment. Molson changed his mind not long afterwards and the bank became fully Canadian-owned when the U.S. partners sold their shares after the U.S. financial crisis in the fall of 1818. By 1822, the bank had received a charter from Britain and changed its name to the Bank of Montreal. Between 1826 and 1834, Molson presided over its affairs.

=== Hospitaller ===
In 1819, Molson had a short bout of sickness. It was during this time that he noticed the only hospital in the city, Hôtel Dieu, only held 30 beds. Molson proposed to the assembly that a new hospital be established that would contain 200 beds. Although the assembly denied his request, there was much private support and soon donations came pouring in. By May the new hospital, the Montreal General Hospital, was opened on Craig Street (now Saint Antoine Street).

=== International beer and spirit merchant ===
A crisis almost struck the Molsons in 1821 when the Mansion House Hotel caught fire; some of the books from the library were saved but not much more was salvageable. Molson was undaunted by this and had ideas to build an even grander hotel, a true testament to his character. While John junior and William took care of the businesses within Canada, Thomas was busy working in England. Thomas brought over 237 gallons of beer to London, England. The response was encouraging and Thomas brought another 1385 gallons on his next trip. Molson's had its first international market.

The first Canadian distillery on an industrial scale was a Molson endeavour. It was in response to the economic collapse that occurred from 1817 to 1820, that Thomas convinced his partners to enter the distillery business, which was industrially a virgin land. From 1820 to 1866, one or another Molson partnership were the largest distillers in Canada. The trade in liquor was only wholesale in nature, because trade at the retail level had been forbidden the managers of a distillery under a law passed in 1794. The Molson company official historian maintains that until 1846, the single most substantial source of revenues were duties on alcoholic beverages. In those pioneer days, alcohol was the primary form by which was monetized grain, and in the absence of Scotch supply the British craved Canadian whiskey. One historian has concluded that, because the cost of transportation rises with volume shipped, Molson shipped concentrated alcohol to his British agents, Grayhurst & Hewat, who then cut it down for retail.

In 1828, the temperance movement in Canada was begun, with Methodist preachers setting up shop first in the Niagara Peninsula, then in Montreal and at Bedford, Nova Scotia. Prohibitionists called for the elimination of import, manufacture and sale of strong liquor for beverage purposes.

=== Theatre impresario ===
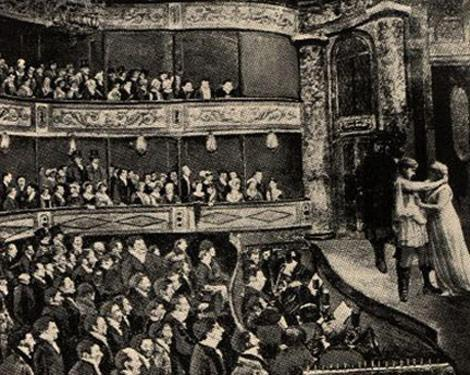
A performance at Molson's Theatre Royal, Montreal, 1825

By 1825, Molson's hotel was completely rebuilt and renamed the British American Hotel. After the hotel was completed Molson built a theatre adjacent to it. By November, Molson's Theatre Royal was completed, the first theatre in Montreal. It seated 1,000 guests, presenting Shakespeare and Restoration authors and was also used for circuses and concerts. Edmund Kean and Charles Dickens both performed there before it was demolished in 1844 to make way for the Bonsecours Market.

Never resting, Molson continued to build his empire by purchasing multiple steamships and creating the St Lawrence Steamboat Company. This fleet of ships was so big that it outnumbered all of those operating in the United States. In 1826 Molson decided to run against a young Louis-Joseph Papineau but resigned quickly after discovering the amount of support Papineau had from the French and the Irish.

On 18 March 1829, Molson's wife Sarah Vaughan, died after treating her rheumatism with laudanum. Sarah became addicted to this opium-based painkiller and died from the effects. Molson sold the house they lived in together and moved on with his life. His four-year term as president of the Bank of Montreal (1826–1830) ended and Molson did not run for a second. Even at the age of 67 Molson did not contemplate retirement; one of his biggest projects still lay ahead.

=== Railway entrepreneur ===
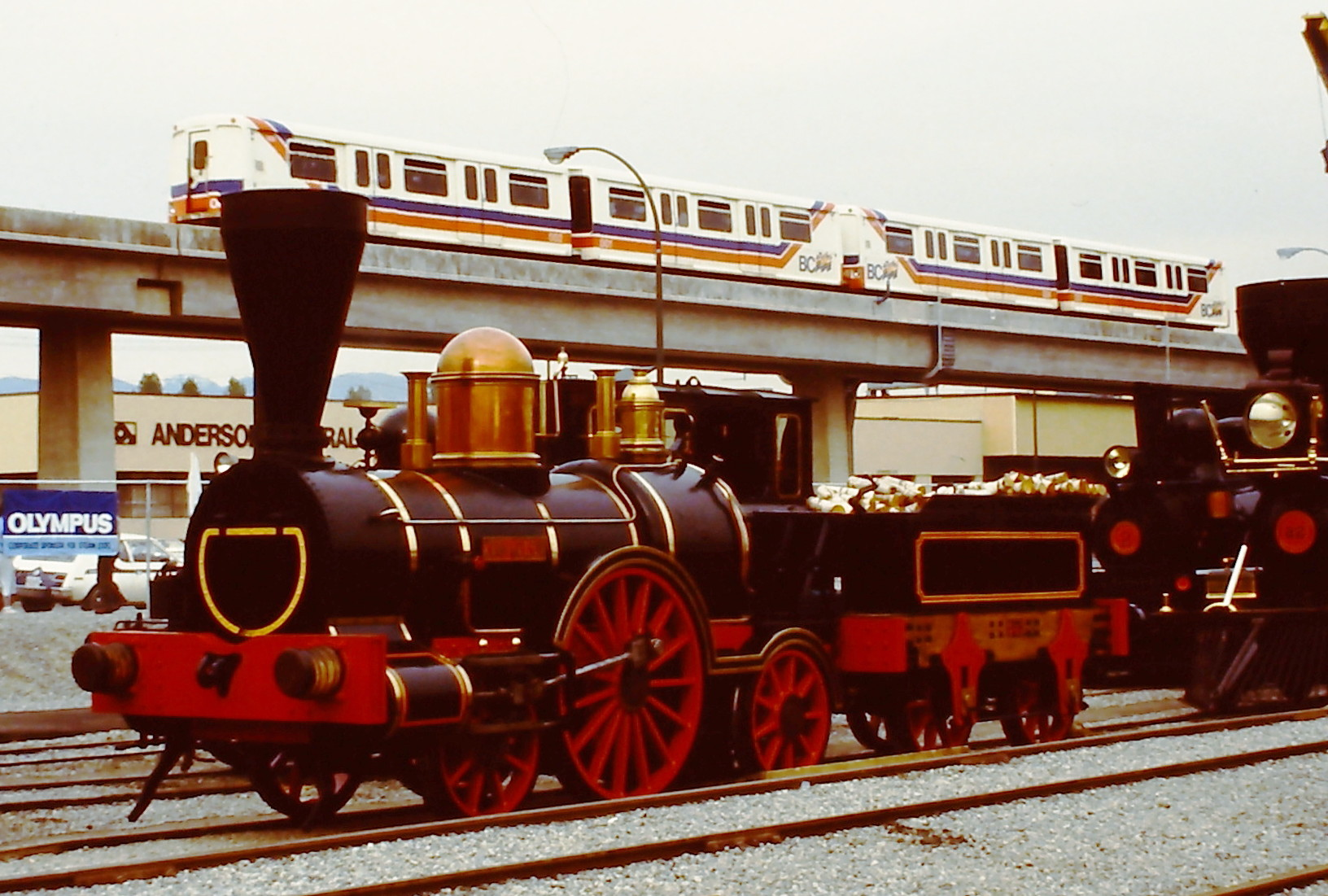
Replica at World's Fair Expo 86 in Vancouver of the C&SL locomotive

Since 1825, Molson had followed reports of the first railways being built in England. Molson had told the head of this project, Jason Pierce, that he was interested. Pierce did not forget about Molson's interest and in 1832 Molson's request for a railroad was accepted by the Assembly. The Champlain and St Lawrence Railroad was to connect the St Lawrence to the Hudson River, making the trip from Montreal to New York much quicker. This was the first railway ever constructed in Canada. Molson became the Railroad's largest shareholder, when a cholera epidemic that struck Canada in 1832 and 1834 added to echoes of the economic depression caused by the crisis closure of the Second Bank of the United States. This all caused the railroad project to lose much of its momentum. Many businesses closed in Montreal but the Molsons continued work as usual. Construction of the railroad was begun in 1835, and was completed on Thursday 21 July 1836 with great pomp and ceremony, but without the senior Molson.

After his multiple successful proposals, John Molson was appointed to the Legislative Council of Lower Canada. He was considered part of the "Chateau Clique" as he was a rich English businessman. The people were losing their faith in English businessmen like Molson and were turning to men like Papineau and Robert Nelson, both members of the Patriote movement. In 1833 Molson's hotel burned down again. This time though, Molson decided not to rebuild it.

=== Freemason ===
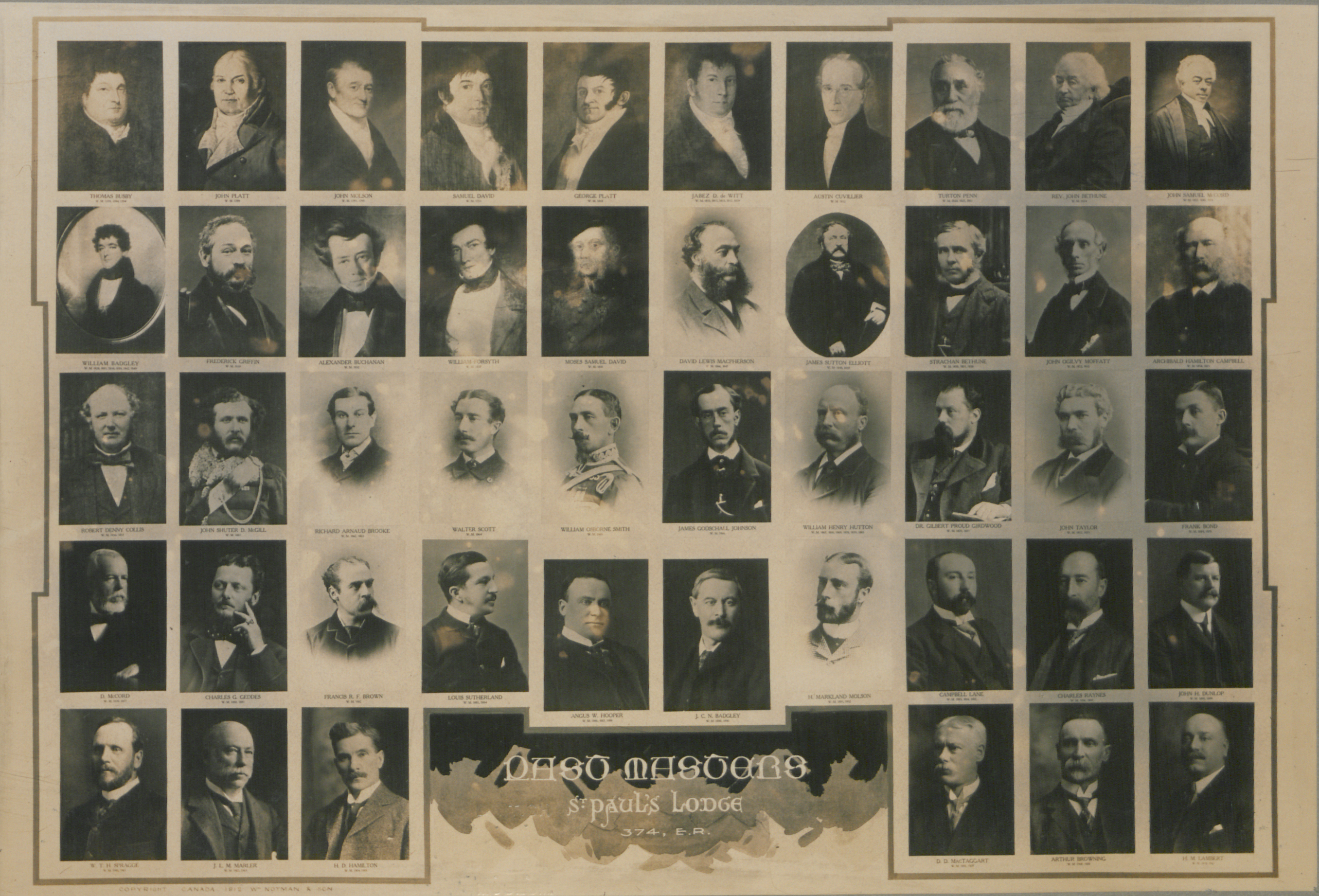
Likenesses of the masters of St Paul's Lodge 374 in Montreal. Molson is third from the left on the first line.

Molson was appointed Provincial Grand Master of the District Grand Lodge of Montreal (Freemasons) by the Duke of Sussex by Letters Patent dated 15 May 1826 and installed in office by Claude Dénéchau on 5 September 1826; Molson resigned in 1833.

== Death and legacy ==
When things returned to normal after the second cholera epidemic, Molson's railroad project began to gain speed. Unfortunately, he did not live long enough to see his last dream realized. Molson caught a high fever in December 1835. He wrote his will on 11 January 1836, and died that day. In his will, Molson named John Molson junior, Thomas Molson, William Molson, George Moffatt and Peter McGill executors. His remains now rest in a family mausoleum at Mount Royal Cemetery.

In 1955, a historian noted that of the many and myriad businesses started in 18th-century Montreal, only three remained to that date. The Molson Coors Brewing Company still has the dominant share of the beer industry in Canada.

John Molson's funeral monument in Mount Royal Cemetery

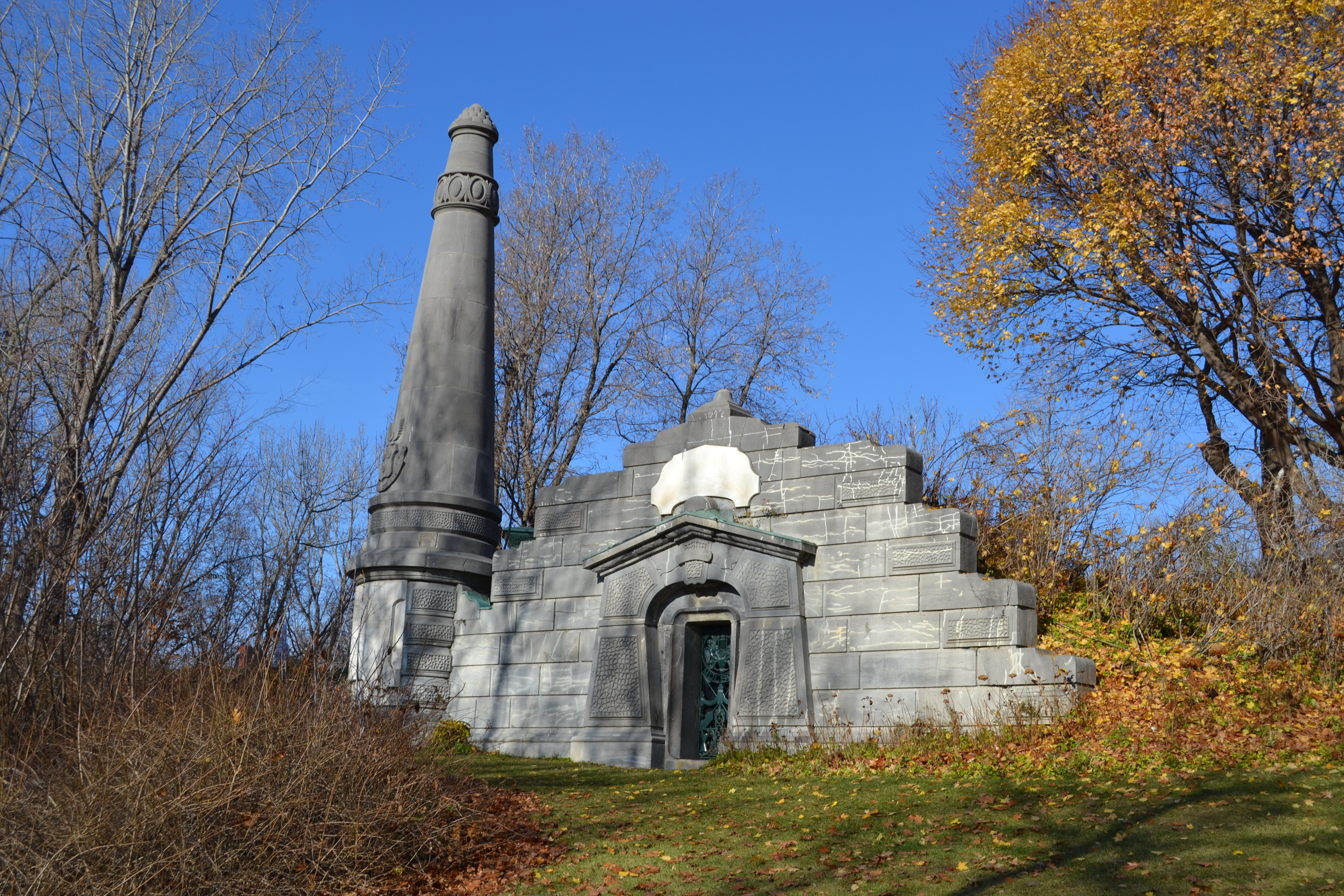

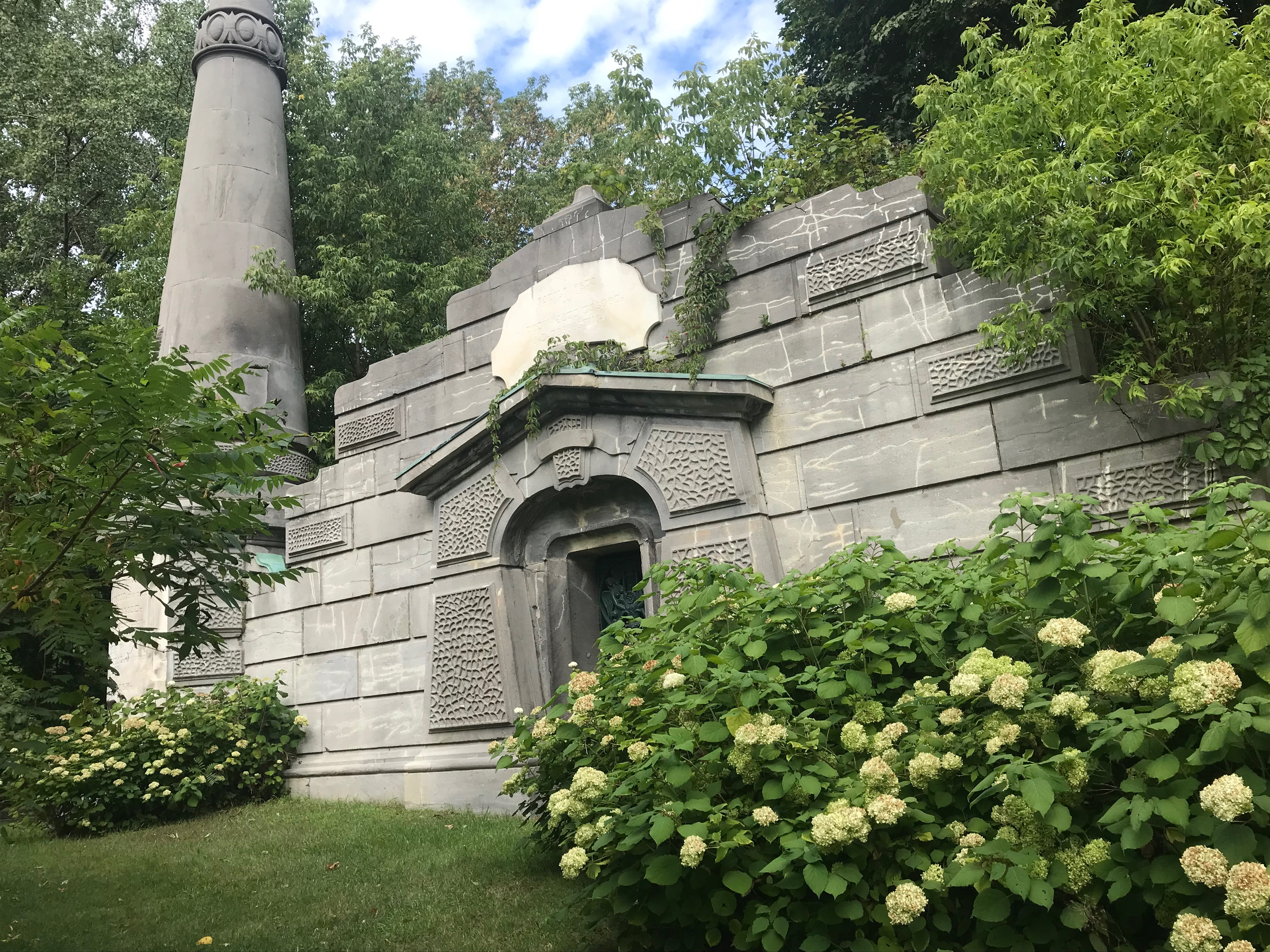

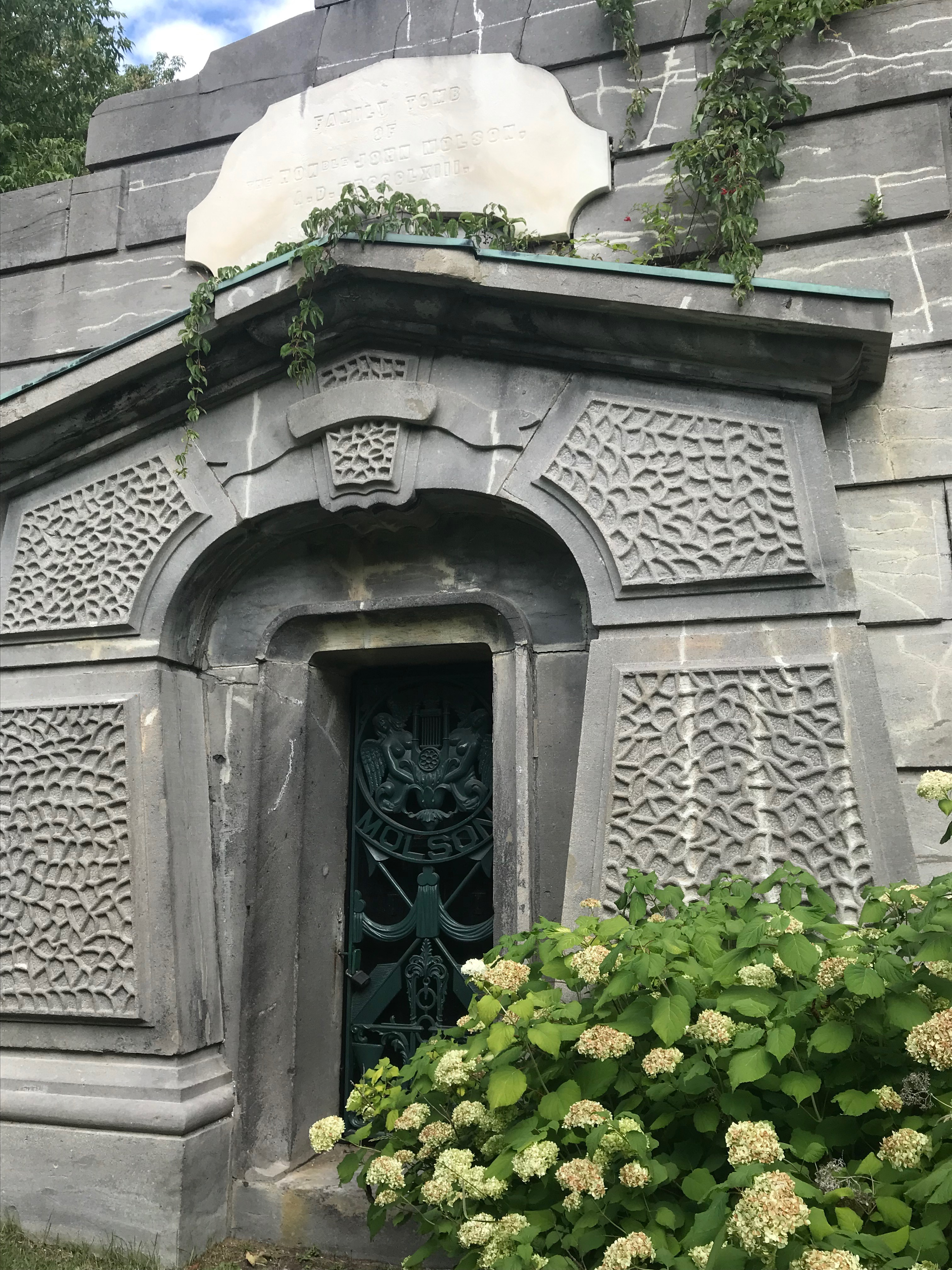

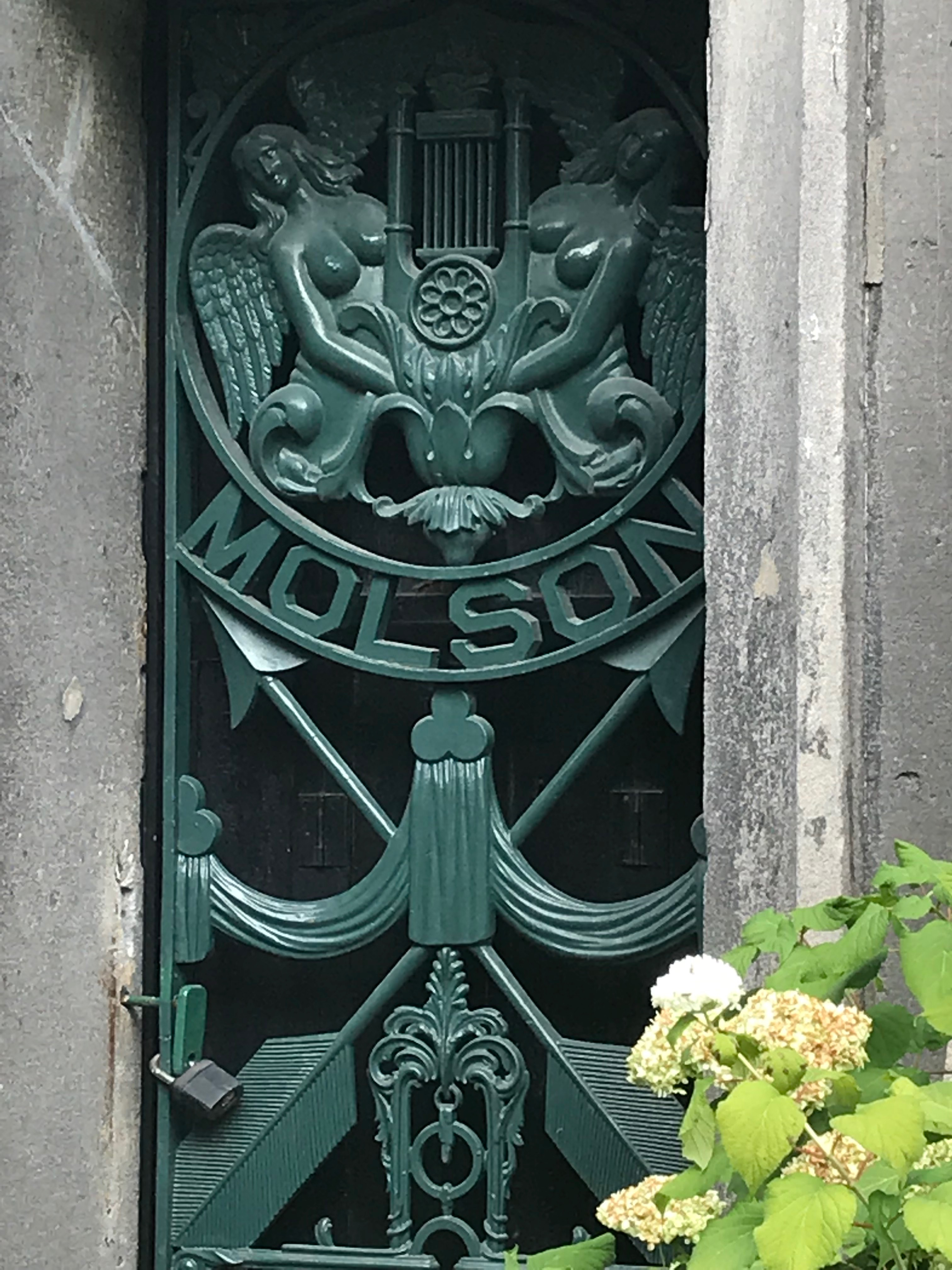

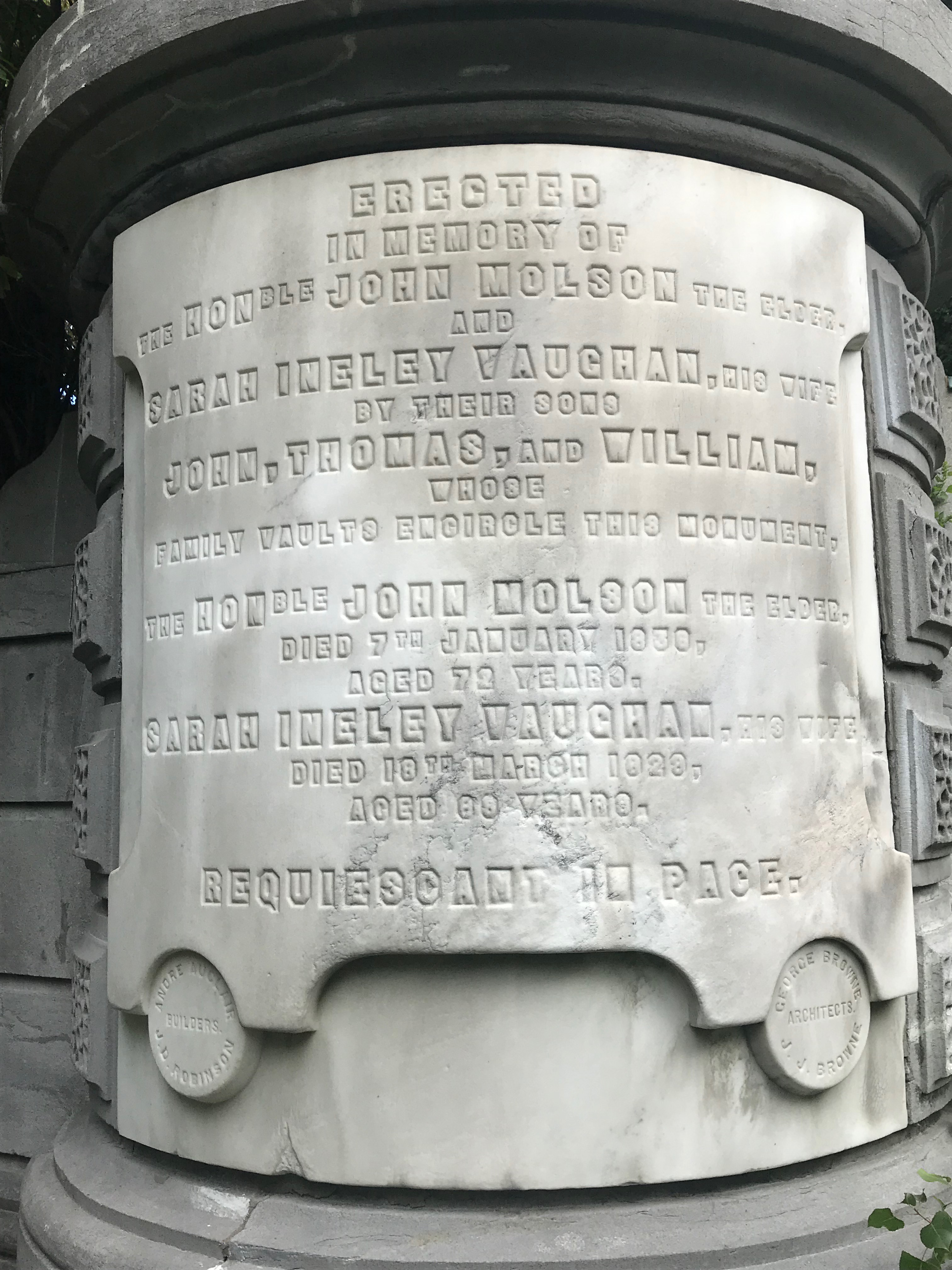

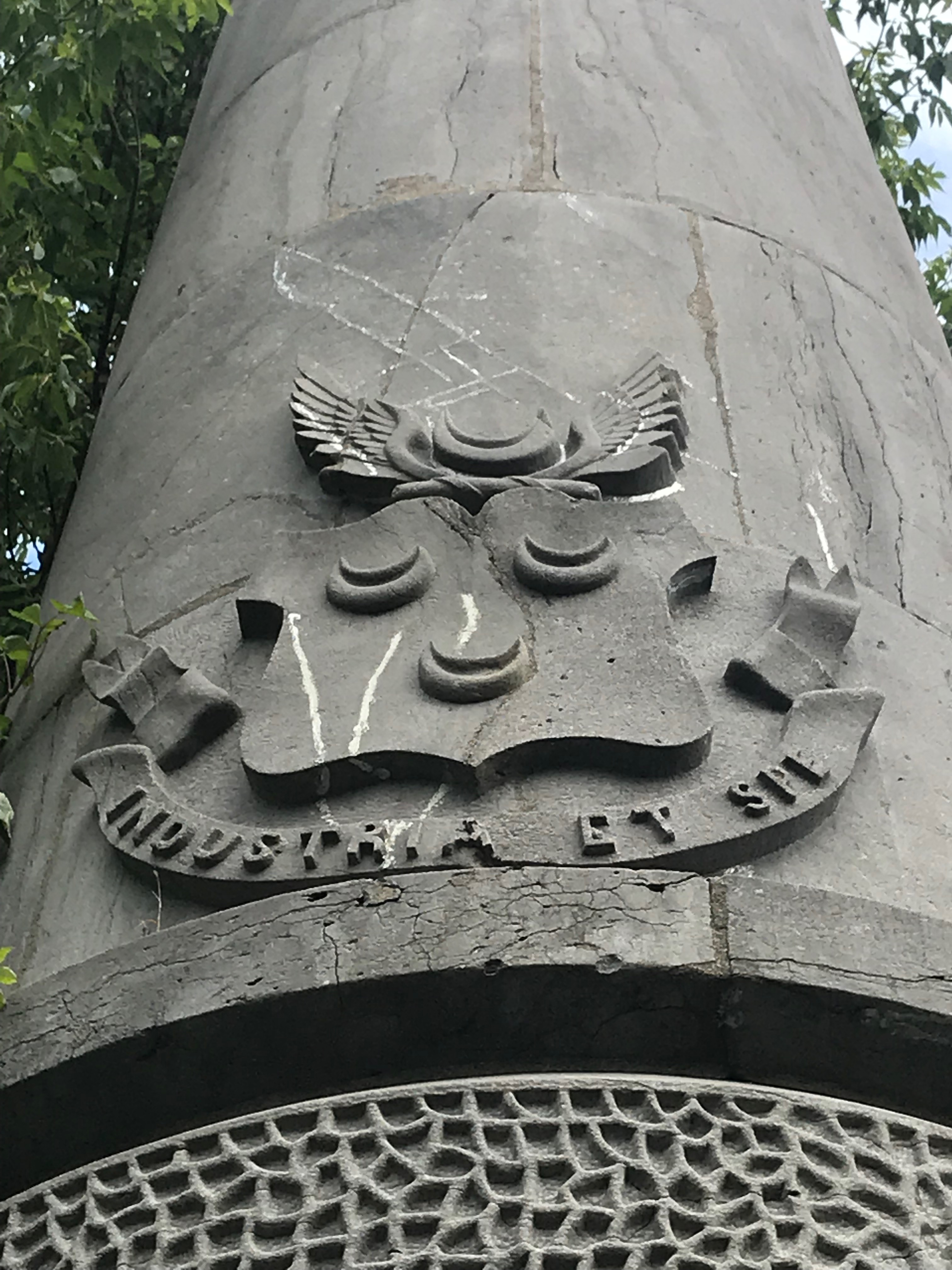

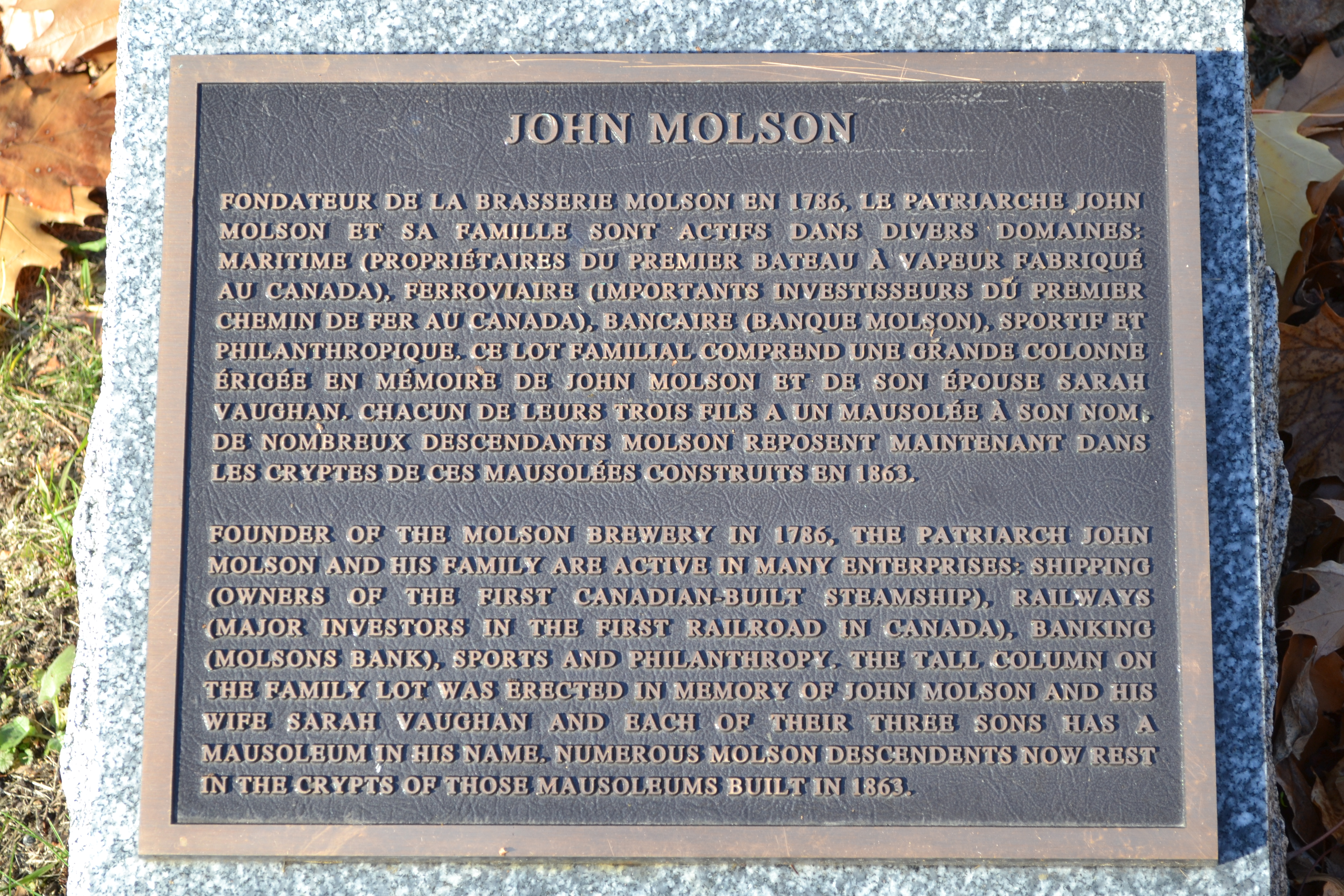

== See also ==
- John Carling
- John Labatt
- William Dow
- John Molson School of Business
- Molson family

Business positions
Preceded by Horatio Gates	President of the Bank of Montreal; 1826–1834	Succeeded by Peter McGill
