= Molson family =

Canadian family

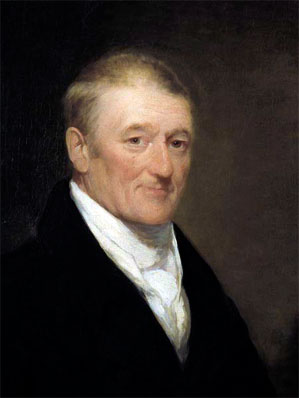
Portrait of the founder, John Molson

Coat of arms of the Molson family

The Molson family of Montreal, Quebec, Canada, was founded by John Molson, who immigrated to Canada in 1782 from his home in Lincolnshire, England. They are considered to be one of Canada's most prominent business families with a combined net worth of C$1.75 billion.

== History ==
John Molson's success saw him and his offspring build Canada's largest brewery (Molson Brewery), finance its first steamboat, and build the first railroad. His sons established Molson's Bank, which printed its own currency, and financed the construction of a Protestant church in Montreal, which was overwhelmingly Catholic.

The three Molson family mausoleums, built by Irish-born architect George Browne, are among Mount Royal Cemetery's most prestigious funerary monuments.

Hartland Molson, a businessman and statesman, expanded the family's brewing operations nationwide, co-purchased the Canadian Arena, which included the Montreal Forum and the Montreal Canadiens ice hockey club (1957–1964), and co-sponsored Hockey Night in Canada with his brother, Thomas Henry Pentland Molson. He also served as a Governor of McGill University, and was Senator in the Senate of Canada for 38 years.

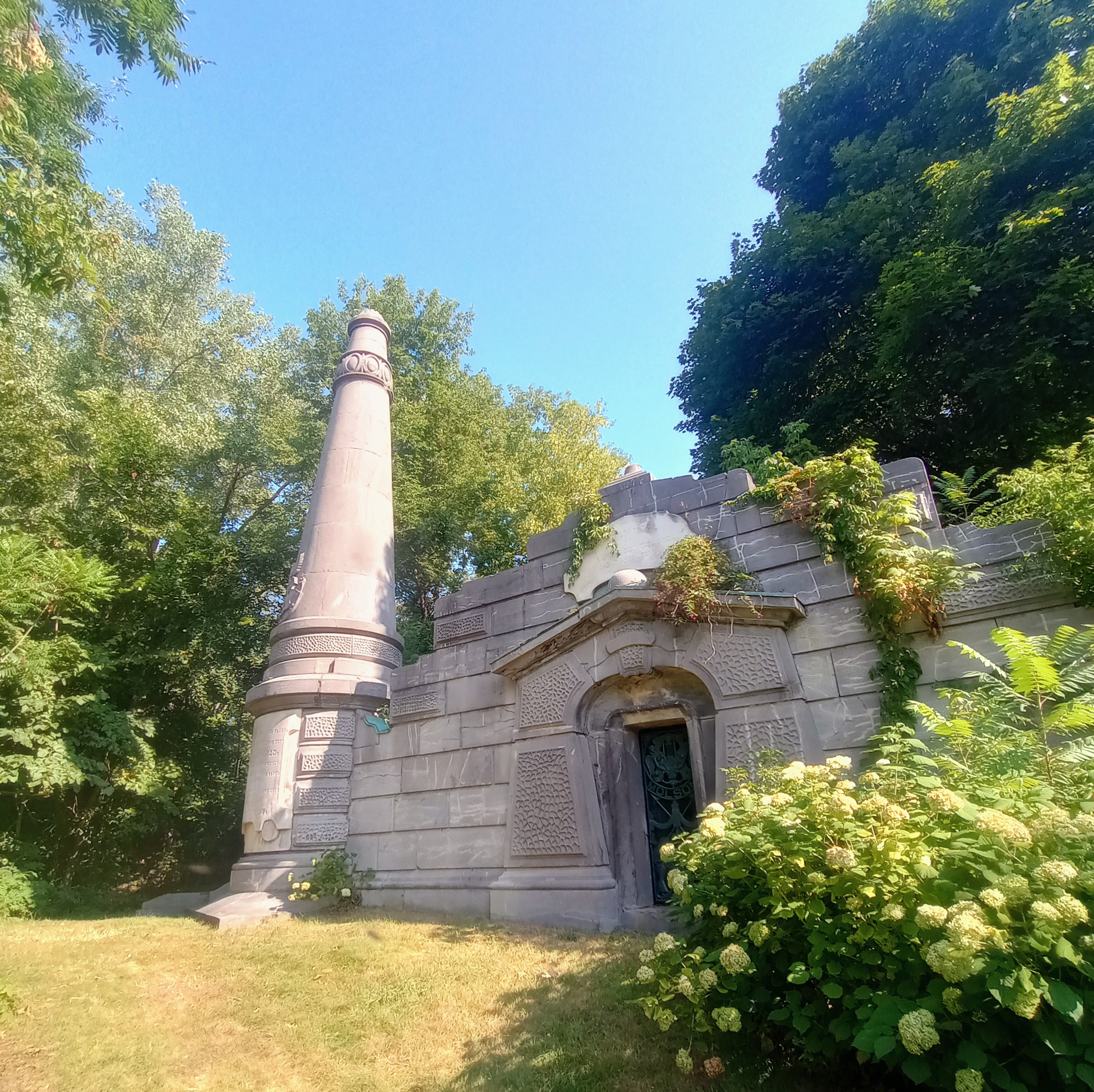
Molson Mausoleum in Mont Royal Cemetery

== Philanthropy ==
As major contributors to the economy, Hartland Molson and his brother Thomas Henry Pentland Molson gave back by creating the Molson Foundation in 1958, which awarded annual grants for outstanding achievement in the arts by Canadian citizens (renamed the Molson Family Foundation in 1981). The Thomas Henry Pentland Molson Prize for the Arts is awarded by The Canada Council for the Arts annually to distinguished individuals in the arts and the social sciences and humanities, and is intended to encourage continuing contribution to the cultural and intellectual heritage of Canada. The Thomas Henry Pentland Prize for general excellence is awarded annually at Selwyn House School, which he attended in 1911. The Thomas Henry Pentland Molson Family Scholarship is awarded annually by the Lester B. Pearson United World College of the Pacific.

William, Thomas and John Molson Jr. provided McGill University's first endowed chair, the Molson Chair in English Language and Literature, currently held by Maggie Kilgour. In addition, in 1860, William Molson donated Molson Hall, the west wing of the university's Arts Building. Later generations of the Molson family provided funds to expand the university's medical buildings, as well as a gift of land for the Redpath Library. The university's Percival Molson Memorial Stadium is named in honour of Percival Molson, who was killed during World War I and left $75,000 in his will to help pay most of the total costs of constructing the stadium.

In 2005, the Molson Family Foundation donated the Hartland Molson Hall at Bishop's College School and the building is named for Senator Hartland Molson, where many Molson family members attended school.

The Molson Family Foundation, together with several members of the family, contributed the major part of the funds required for the construction of the Molson Fine Arts Building at Bishop's University. The building bears witness to the interest of members of the Molson family in the welfare of Bishop's University, over a period of more than 60 years: Walter Molson, Trustee 1928–1951, John H. Molson, President of Corporation 1947–1966, J. David Molson, Trustee 1965–1968, William M. Molson, Trustee 1968–1976, Eric H. Molson, Trustee 1976–1984.

== Notable members of the Molson family ==
- John Molson (1763–1836)
  - John Molson Jr. (1787–1860)
    - John Molson (1820–1907)
      - William Alexander Molson (1852–1920)
        - William Hobart Molson (1888–1951), only son of Dr. William Alexander Molson
    - Samuel Elsdale Molson (1822–1893)
      - John Elsdale Molson (1863–1925)
        - Arthur Hugh Molson, Baron Molson (1903–1991)
  - Thomas Molson (1791–1863)
    - Martha Molson (1824–1900)
    - John Henry Robinson Molson (1826–1897)
    - Mary Anne Molson (1828–1922)
    - Harriet Molson (1830–1913)
    - William Markland Molson (1833–1913)
      - Harry Markland Molson (1856–1912)
      - Frederick William Molson (1860–1929)
        - John Henry Molson (1896–1977)
          - J. David Molson (1928–2017), son of John Henry Molson
    - John Thomas Molson (1837–1910)
      - Lillias Savage Molson (1866–1919)
      - Herbert Molson (1875–1938)
        - Thomas Henry Pentland Molson (1901–1978)
          - Eric Molson (b. 1937)
            - Andrew Molson (b. 1967)
            - Justin Molson (b. 1969)
            - Geoff Molson (b. 1971), CEO and President of the Montreal Canadiens and former VP with Molson
        - Mary Dorothy Molson MacDougall (1904–1992)
        - Naomi Elizabeth Molson Mather (1906–1992)
        - Hartland Molson (1907–2002)
      - Kenneth Molson (1877–1932)
      - Mabel Molson (1879–1973)
      - Percival Molson (1880–1917)
      - Walter Molson (1883–1953)
  - William Molson (1793–1875)
    - Anne Molson (1824–1899), married cousin John Molson (1820–1907)

== See also ==
- William Alexander Molson House
