= John Frothingham =

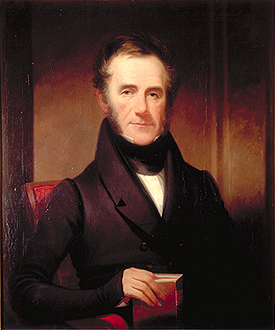
- Born: June 1788; Portland, Maine
- Died: 22 May 1870 (aged 81); Montreal, Quebec
- Occupations: Partner of the hardware House of Frothingham & Workman

John Frothingham (June 1788 – 22 May 1870) was a Canadian merchant. He established British North America's largest wholesale hardware house, Frothingham & Workman. He was President of the City Bank of Montreal from 1834 to 1849, and a generous contributor to Queen's University, McGill University and Montreal's Protestant schools. The house he purchased in the 1830s, Piedmont (demolished in 1939), was one of the early estates of the Golden Square Mile. In 1890, its ten acres of grounds were purchased for $86,000 by Lords Strathcona and Mount Stephen, on which they built the Royal Victoria Hospital.

== Early life ==
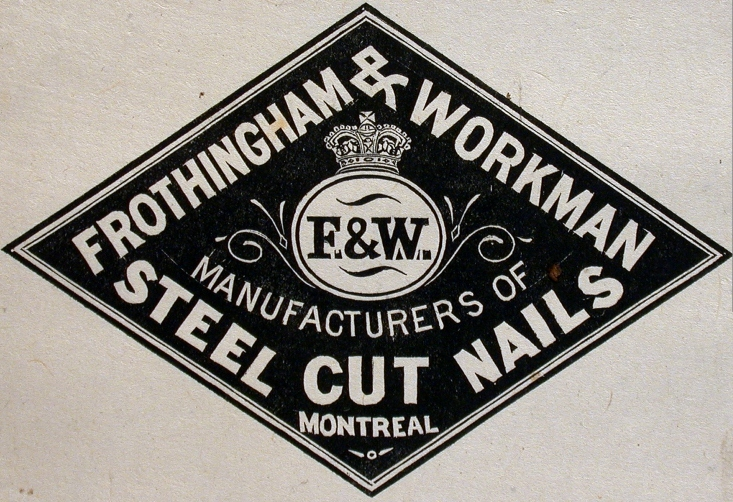
Label from the hardware house of Frothingham & Workman

In 1788, Frothingham was born at Portland, Maine. He was the son of The Hon. John Frothingham (1749–1826), a graduate of Harvard University who became a judge of the Superior Court of Massachusetts and kept a summer house at Portland. His mother, Martha (1763–1834), was the daughter of Samuel May (1723–1794), a prominent merchant of Roxbury, Massachusetts. He was a first cousin of Samuel Joseph May.

From an early age, John was employed in his uncle Samuel May's hardware firm in Boston. In 1809, he was sent to Montreal to open a branch there. Following the War of 1812, Americans tended to be discriminated against both socially and in business, and he suffered a few early setbacks. However, Frothingham re-established himself by setting up his own hardware business in partnership with his younger brother, Joseph May Frothingham, who died in 1832.

In 1836, Frothingham went into partnership with William Workman, and their firm became the largest hardware and iron wholesale house in British North America. By 1853, Frothingham & Workman had moved to larger premises and started to manufacture some of their own merchandise.

== Life in Montreal ==
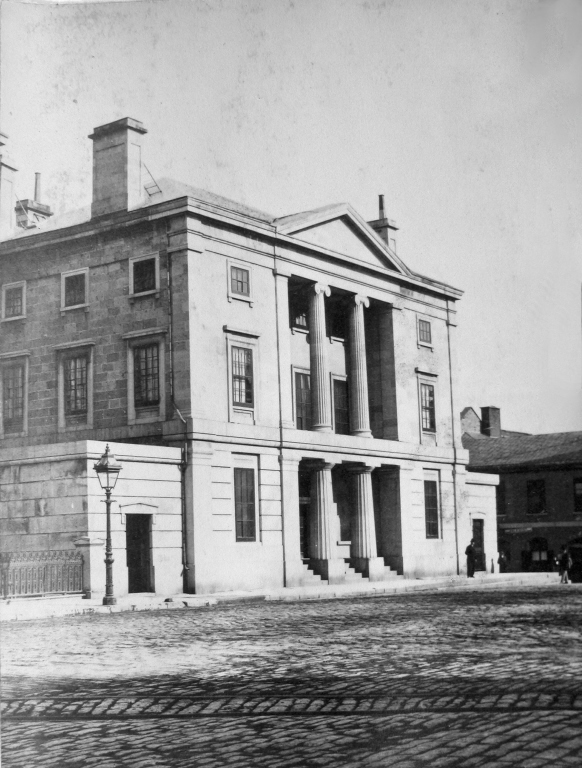
City Bank, Montreal. Frothingham was president from 1834 to 1849

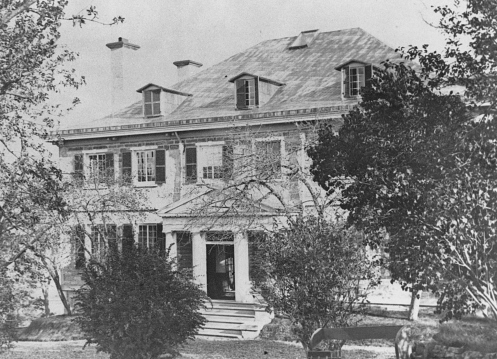
Piedmont House, home to the Frothinghams from the early 1830s to 1910

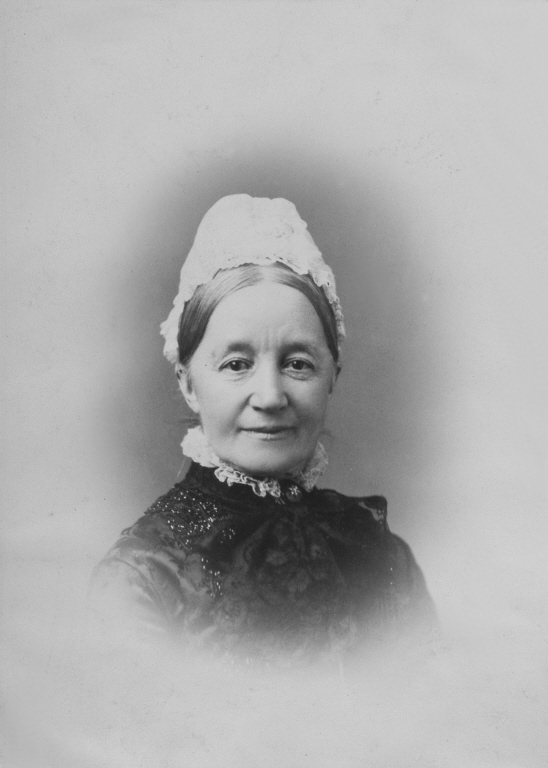
Mrs Louisa (Frothingham) Molson

Frothingham promoted and invested in a wide variety of business interests that were being formed during the expansion of Montreal in the 1840s. Among others, these included, Montreal Board of Trade, the St Lawrence and Atlantic Railroad, the Montreal Stock Exchange and the Canada Inland Steam Navigation Company. He was also associated with the British and Canadian School of Montreal and the Montreal Horticultural Society.

His principal business interest outside of his hardware firm was the City Bank of Montreal. Founded in 1831, it was the only bank since 1817 to have successfully broken the financial monopoly held by the Bank of Montreal. The initial capital had been supplied by investors from New York and Frothingham was associated with the bank from its origins, along with several other prominent Montrealers, who in opposition to the Scots-Quebecers were almost all English Canadian, French Canadian or American. Frothingham held a substantial quantity of the bank's stock and he was a director of the bank for about sixteen years, before serving as the bank's president from 1834 to 1849. He resigned in 1849 after the bank sustained heavy losses and was succeeded by his close friend and business partner, William Workman. Frothingham took no interest in politics.

== Family and last years ==
In 1816, at Brookline, Massachusetts, Frothingham married his first cousin, Louisa Goddard Archibald (1794–1843), daughter of Azor Gale Archibald (1763–1810) and Lucretia May (1765–1811). They were the parents of seven children, but the four eldest all died young. The three surviving children of the Frothinghams were:

- George Henry Frothingham (1823–1875), of Montreal. He joined his father's business and in 1844 married Louisa Davenport Hayward (1826-1876), daughter of Joseph Henshaw Hayward (1789-1853), of Roxbury, Massachusetts, and his wife Mary May Davenport.
- Frederick Frothingham (1825–1891), of Milton, Massachusetts. Educated at Harvard University, at Greenfield, Massachusetts in 1872, he married Lois Ripley Wright (1833–1900), of Lowell, Massachusetts.
- Louisa Goddard Frothingham (1827–1910). After her mother's death in 1843, she vowed to stay with her father at Piedmont as his companion and housekeeper for as long as he may live. Her eventual husband, John Henry Robinson Molson, son of Thomas Molson of Montreal, had to wait thirty years before he could marry her, by which time she was too old to have children. They continued to live at Piedmont and she worked closely with the Montreal Protestant Orphan Asylum and helped pioneer the cause for higher education for women. Among many other charitable bequests, she gave over $120,000 to the Protestant Hospital for the Insane; $240,000 to the Montreal General Hospital and $100,000 to the Royal Institution for the Advancement of Learning.

In the early 1830s, Frothingham had purchased Piedmont House from Louis-Charles Foucher, one of the early estates of the Golden Square Mile. The house stood among orchards and formal gardens and was approached by a long tree-lined drive. He purchased the house in the hope that the country air would cure his ailing wife. When Parliament met during the winter at Montreal, Piedmont had been used as the Governor Generals residence. The house was situated on the McGill University campus and was demolished in 1939.

Having retired from business in 1859, Frothingham lived quietly at Piedmont. Frothingham was a Presbyterian and a generous contributor to Queen's University, McGill University and Montreal's Protestant schools. His papers and diaries are kept at the University of Toronto.
