= Louisa Goddard Molson =

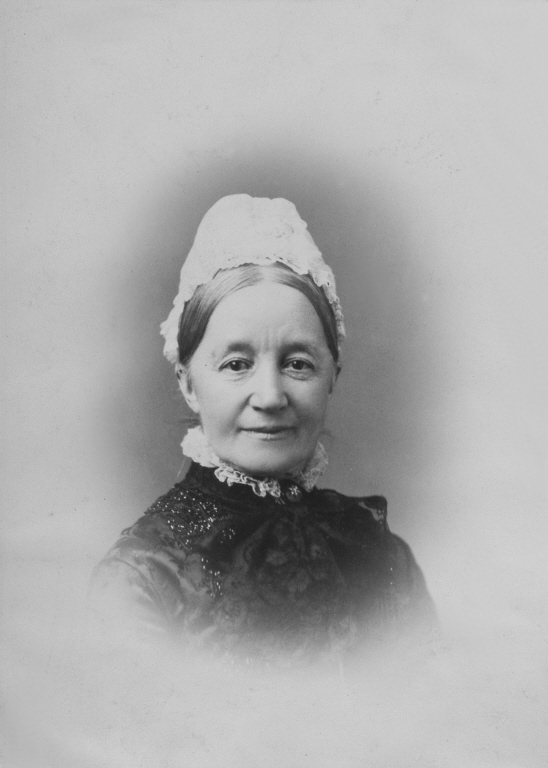
- Louisa Goddard Frothingham Molson, from an 1881 publication.
- Born: Louisa Goddard Frothingham; April 15, 1827; Montreal, Lower Canada
- Died: August 12, 1910 (aged 83)
- Occupation: Philanthropist
- Spouse: John Henry Robinson Molson
- Parent(s): John Frothingham; Louisa Goddard (Archibald) Frothingham
- Relatives: Frederick Frothingham (brother); Thomas Molson (father-in-law); Harry Markland Molson (nephew)

Louisa Goddard Molson (née Frothingham; April 15, 1827 – August 12, 1910), known socially as Mrs. John H. R. Molson, was a Canadian philanthropist.

== Early life ==
Louisa Goddard Frothingham was born in Montreal, Lower Canada, the daughter of John Frothingham. Her father had a hardware business. She was the namesake of her mother, Louisa Goddard (née Archibald) Frothingham; she had a similarly named sister-in-law, Louisa Davenport Hayward Frothingham.

== Philanthropy ==
When she was 18 years old, Frothingham joined the management committee of the Montreal Protestant Orphan Asylum. She continued to be active in the administration of the asylum for the next 64 years. She was also a manager of the Protestant Infants' Home of Montreal, a manager of the Mackay Institute, and a life governor of the Montreal Maternity Hospital. Beginning in 1890, she served on the board of governors at the Protestant Hospital for the Insane. She was the second president of the Montreal Ladies' Educational Association, succeeding her sister-in-law Anne Molson.

Molson had an inherited fortune, and made significant donations and bequests to many of her causes, including the above-named charities, McGill University, Montreal General Hospital, the Art Association of Montreal, the Mount Royal Cemetery, the Montreal Ladies' Benevolent Society, and the Unitarian Church of the Messiah. In 1895, she was an honoured guest at the opening ceremonies for the new medical campus at McGill.

== Personal life ==
Frothingham married businessman John Henry Robinson Molson in 1873. They were close to Molson's nephew, Harry Markland Molson, the mayor of Dorval, who was a passenger on the Titanic (he did not survive). She was widowed in 1897, and she died in 1910.
