= Allison family =

Canadian family on RMS Titanic

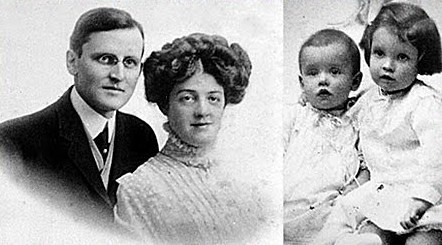
The Allison family

The Allison family was a Canadian family of first-class passengers on board the RMS Titanic, which sank on her maiden voyage.

The family consisted of Hudson Joshua Creighton Allison (9 Dec 1881 – 15 Apr 1912); his wife, Bess Waldo Allison (née Daniels; 14 Nov 1886 – 15 Apr 1912); their daughter, Helen Loraine Allison (5 Jun 1909 – 15 Apr 1912); and son, Hudson Trevor Allison (7 May 1911 – 7 Aug 1929).

Of the family, only Trevor survived the sinking. He was rescued by his nursemaid Alice Cleaver.

== Hudson J. C. Allison ==
Hudson Allison
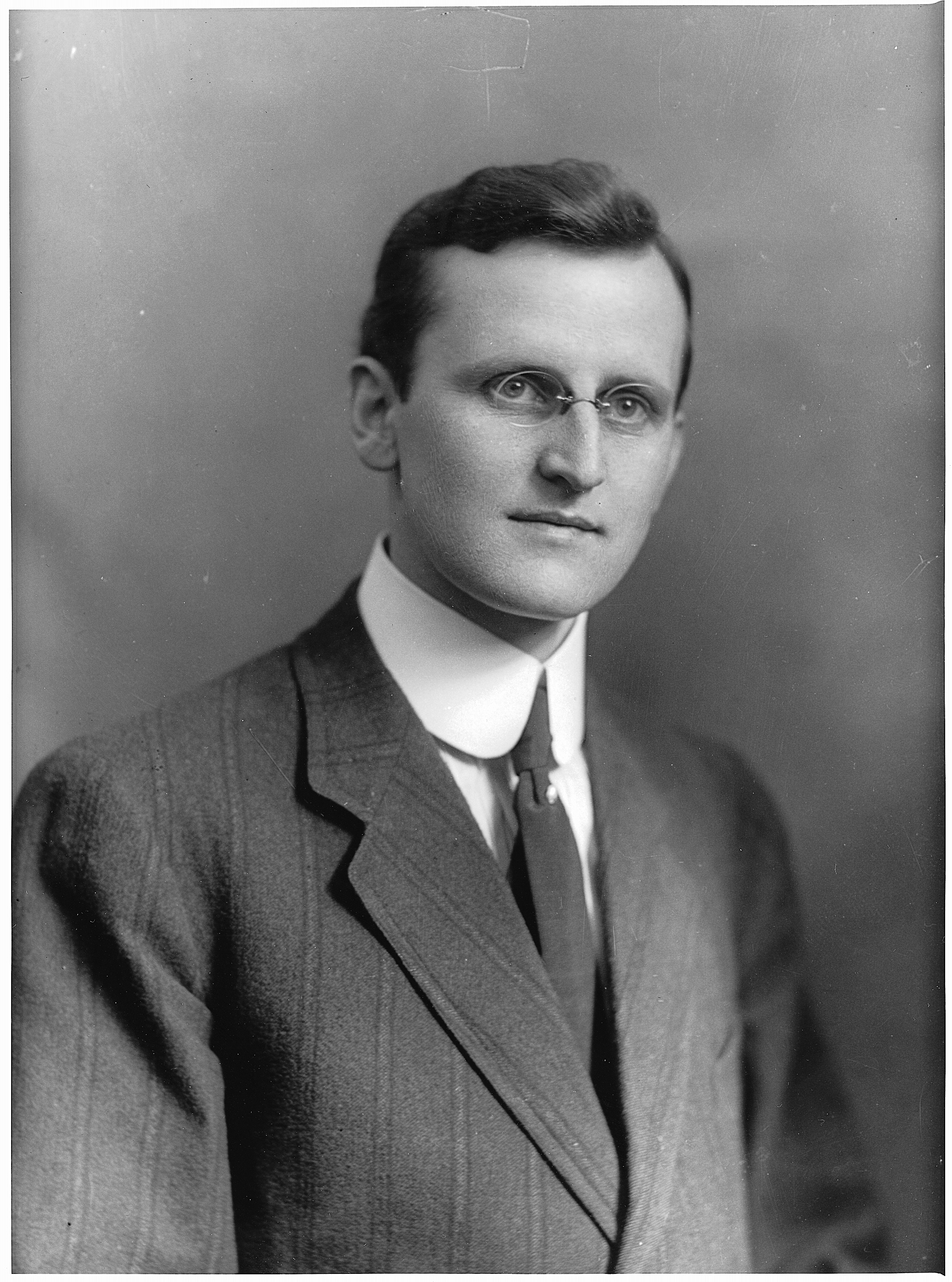
- Studio photo of Allison, c. 1909
- Born: Hudson Joshua Creighton Allison; 9 December 1881; Chesterville, Ontario, Canada
- Died: 15 April 1912 (aged 30); Atlantic Ocean
- Spouse: Bess Allison (1907–1912)
- Children: 2

Hudson Joshua Creighton Allison was born on 9 December 1881 in Winchester Township, Dundas County, Ontario, near the village of Chesterville. He was the third of four children born to Jesse Rose Allison and Phoebe Johnston. His father was a farmer, though he had previous manufactured pumps with a business partner, William Manson, in Metcalfe, Ontario until their partnership was dissolved in 1874. Hudson had one sister, Margaret Rachel Allison, and two brothers, George Richey Barber Allison and William Percival "Percy" Allison. Through his brother Percy, he was the great grand-uncle of actress Sophia Bush.

All four of Hudson's grandparents were Irish immigrants. His paternal grandparents, Andrew Allison and Jannet Richey, arrived in Canada prior to 1829, when they were married in Quebec. By 1832, the family had settled in Dundas County, Ontario; most of their children, including Hudson's father Jesse, were born in Winchester Township, with others born in Williamsburg Township.

Hudson's maternal grandparents, Isaac Johnston and Margaret Humphries, were from County Fermanagh and County Down, respectively. By 1844, when they were married, Isaac was living in Oxford, Grenville County, Ontario, and Margaret was living in Elizabethtown, Leeds County, Ontario. All of their children, including Hudson's mother Phoebe, were born in Oxford. The Johnston family resided in Oxford until the late 1860s, when they moved to Winchester Township, Dundas County. Both of Hudson's grandfathers were farmers.

Hudson received his elementary and high school education in Chesterville. After graduating, he began working as a clerk in the general store of Chester Casselman in that village. When the 1901 Census was gathered in April 1901, he was also boarding with Casselman and his family. Soon after, he travelled to Buffalo, New York to study shorthand. By June 1902, he had completed his studies and moved to Montreal to live and work with his maternal uncle, George Franklin Johnston, who was an insurance manager for the New York Life Insurance Company. Hudson began as a stenographer for his uncle before later becoming an insurance agent with the company. They resided at 4065 Dorchester Boulevard. By June 1904, their address had changed to 4298 Dorchester.

In 1905, he was promoted to the position of instructor, and in this role he became acquainted with land baron Colonel Andrew Duncan Davidson, who sold railway and homestead lands in Western Canada. Davidson convinced Hudson to move to Winnipeg in 1906. He submitted his resignation to New York Life in May 1906.

By June 1906, Hudson was boarding with Andrew Hood and family at 92 Sherbrook St., Winnipeg (southwest corner of Sherbrook and Westminster). He would continue to live there in 1907. Henderson's Winnipeg City Directory for 1907, published in January 1907, has two entries for Hudson; one in which his occupation is stated as real estate, and one in which he is listed as working in the insurance department of the Canadian Loan and Securities Co., Ltd., of which Col. Davidson was president.

Around March 1907, Hudson, his uncle G. F. Johnston, and John Wilson McConnell formed the real estate firm of Johnston, McConnell & Allison, which was based in Montreal. It operated out of the Bank of Ottawa Building on St. James St. In April 1907, the Canadian Western Development Co. Ltd. was formed in Winnipeg with Hudson as one of its directors. The board of the company also included Senator Robert Mackay as president, G. F. Johnston as vice-president, J. W. McConnell as secretary-treasurer, and Markland Molson as a director. While in Winnipeg, Hudson also met fellow real estate businessmen Mark Fortune and Thomson Beattie. Molson, Fortune, and Beattie would later die in the Titanic disaster.

== Bess Waldo Daniels ==
Bess Allison
- Born: Bess Waldo Daniels; 14 November 1886; Milwaukee, Wisconsin, US
- Died: 15 April 1912 (aged 25); Atlantic Ocean
- Spouse: Hudson Allison (1907–1912)
- Children: 2

Bessie Waldo Daniels, known as Bess, was born on 14 November 1886 in Milwaukee, Wisconsin. She was the youngest daughter of Arville Fisher Daniels and Sarah J. McCully. Her father, who was at various times a hatmaker, a ship clerk, and a railway clerk, was from Franklin, Massachusetts, while her mother was from Milwaukee. Bess had one older sister, Maybelle Helen Daniels. She also had an older half-sister from her father's previous marriage to Mary L. Bowden named Myrtle Rowena Daniels, who was raised in Massachusetts by Arville's family.

Bess's paternal side had deep roots in Massachusetts, particularly in Dedham, Wrentham, Medfield, and Franklin. Her family can be traced back to at least eleven Puritan signatories of the Dedham Covenant:

- Samuel Morse and son Joseph
- Thomas Wight
- Joseph Clark
- James Allen/Allin
- Henry Smith/Smyth
- Anthony Fisher and son Cornelius
- Michael Metcalf
- Nathaniel Colburn
- Jonathan Fairbanks

Bess' maternal grandparents, James McCully and Rose Dixon, were both immigrants from Ireland. James fought for the Union Army during the American Civil War, reaching the rank of Sergeant in Company B of the 29th Wisconsin Infantry Regiment. The McCully family was well reguarded in Milwaukee; after the Titanic disaster, one Milwaukee newspaper wrote that Bess "had the blood of the McCulleys in her veins and it made her brave."

Bess' parents were married on 24 December 1877 in Milwaukee. The family lived at various addresses on Reed St. in Milwaukee in the 1870s and early 1880s. When Bess was born, the family was residing at 289 Lapham Blvd., where they remained until January 1889, when they moved to Hartford, Connecticut. Arville was employed there by the New York and New England Railroad until about 1893 or 1894. By July 1894, the family had returned to Milwaukee. City directories show them living at 334 21st Ave. in 1895 and at 371 18th Ave. from 1897 to 1902. By 1906, the family was residing with Bess' maternal grandparents, James and Rose McCully, at 91 Farwell Ave., where they were still residing at the time of Bess' marriage to Hudson Allison in December 1907.

Bess graduated from the Eighth District School (1210 Mineral St.) in Milwaukee in 1901. She then attended both the West Division High School (2300 W Highland Ave.) and the South Division High School (1515 West Lapham Blvd.).

== Marriage and children ==
Loraine Allison
- Born: Helen Loraine Allison; 5 June 1909; Westmount, Quebec, Canada
- Died: 15 April 1912 (aged 2); Atlantic Ocean

Hudson Trevor Allison
- Born: Hudson Trevor Allison; 7 May 1911; Westmount, Quebec, Canada
- Died: 7 August 1929 (aged 18); Ocean Park, Maine, U.S.

Hudson met Bess while he was travelling by train to Montreal in 1907. Their engagement was announced that September, at which time Hudson was still living in Winnipeg. The couple were married on 9 December 1907, Hudson's 26th birthday, at Westminster Church in Milwaukee, Wisconsin. They resided in Montreal after their marriage.

Both Hudson and Bess were active community members. They were prominent members of the Douglas Methodist Church, located at the corner of St. Catherine and Chomedy Streets in Montreal. Shortly after the new Trinity Methodist Church in Chesterville was completed in 1909, Hudson donated a bell in memory of his late father. Hudson was a avid supporter of the Montreal YMCA, having contributed to their building fund in 1909. He was elected a life governor of the Montreal General Hospital in February 1911, and of Montreal's Western Hospital in January 1912.

Hudson's career prospered in the years following his marriage, and Johnston, McConnell & Allison's success continued. By March 1910, Johnston, McConnell & Allison were involved in the British Canadian Lumber Corporation, of which Hudson would become a director by June 1911. In January 1911, he became a director of Cardiff Collieries Ltd., a coal mining company. By April 1912, he was also president of the British Empire Securities Company.

During their marriage, Hudson travelled to and from the United Kingdom at least five times for work, often bringing Bess with him. In 1910, they sailed on the Empress of Ireland, which would sink four years later, killing over one thousand people. Hudson's second-to-last overseas trip, spanning from February to April 1911, was in relation to a major lumber deal in British Columbia with the British Canadian Lumber Corporation that was worth $20 million. He and his uncle, G. F. Johnston, represented Johnston, McConnell and Allison. They were in England when the 1911 UK Census was taken; they were staying at the Carlton Hotel in London. On Hudson's return, his ship docked in New York. The incoming passenger list noted him as being 5'11" in height and of tan complexion, with brown hair and grey eyes. His destination was 646 Roslyn Ave. in Westmount, where he would arrive just two weeks before his son's birth.

The Allisons had been living at 464 Roslyn Ave. since at least June 1909; an announcement of the purchase was published the following month. The couple had two children while living there. Their daughter, Helen Loraine, was born on 5 June 1909. Their son, Hudson Trevor, was born on 7 May 1911. When the 1911 Census was taken in June of that year, the Allisons had two domestic servants and a coachman living with them: Scottish-born Catherine or Cathelaine Sinclair, 22, and English-born couple Edith and Alfred Creasey, 35 and 34, respectively. The Allisons would reside at Roslyn Ave. until November 1911. Shortly after, they put it up for sale, and the property was sold in March 1912.

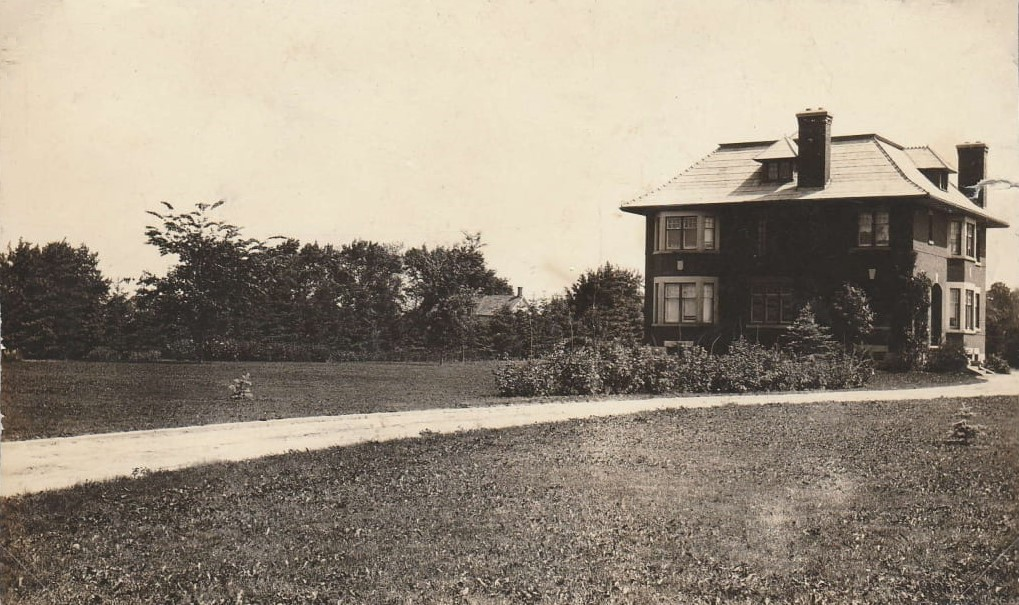
Allison Stock Farm, 1911

In July 1910, Hudson purchased land at the east end of Chesterville with the intention of building a summer home and establishing a stock farm. The land, part of Lots 19 and 20 in Concession 3 of Winchester Township, adjoined his father's property where Hudson had grown up. The house was completed by July 1911, when the family briefly resided there. Hudson's brother Percy managed the Allison Stock Farm.

In November 1911, the Allisons purchased 665 Belmont Ave. in Westmount, which had been built in 1909. The family would shortly after travel to England, and they intended to move into their new home when they returned to Canada. On November 11th, Hudson, Bess, Loraine, and Trevor boarded the White Star Line's SS Megantic in Montreal, arriving in Liverpool, England on November 18th. They were accompanied by Bess' mother Sarah (Mrs. A. F. Daniels), her sister Maybelle (Mrs. W. A. Nieman), and nephew Allison Nieman. Bess's relatives would return to the United States in February 1912, two months before the Allisons. Mrs. Daniels was to prepare the Allisons' Belmont Ave. home for their arrival.

While in England, the Allisons lived at 152 Abbey Road in West Hampstead, London. About two weeks prior to leaving England, Hudson and Bess hired new household staff. This included Sarah Daniels (33; no relation to Bess) as Bess' maid; Alice Cleaver (22) as Trevor's nursemaid; Amelia Mary "Mildred" Brown (18) as their cook; and George Swane (19) as their butler.

Some sources state that the family travelled to Epworth, Lincolnshire during their trip, and that Trevor was baptized there. However, the Douglas Methodist Church in Montreal recorded Trevor's baptism as taking place on 8 November 1911, several days before the family sailed to England.

== Titanic ==
The Allison family delayed their return to Canada in order to sail on the Titanic. They boarded the ship in Southampton along with their four servants, Sarah, Alice, Mildred, and George. The Allisons' ticket number was 113781. Sarah and Alice may have been included on this ticket; their names do not appear on the outward passenger list. Mildred and George's tickets were 248733 and 248734, respectively.

A first class passenger list dated 10 April 1912, which was recovered from the body of crewmember Herbert Cave, shows the Allisons, Sarah, and Alice as occupants of cabins C-22 and C-26. The Cave List, as it has become known, does not note any passengers in cabin C-24. Given the positioning of the cabins and some of the communication errors made between Alice and the Allisons on the night of the sinking, some have speculated that the Allison party also occupied C-24, with Alice and Trevor having a room of their own. However, according to Sarah Daniels, she, Alice, and Trevor shared a cabin adjoining the cabin occupied by Hudson, Bess, and Loraine. A second class passenger list, also recovered from the disaster site, includes the names of Mildred and George, but does not specify which cabins they occupied.

On the evening of 14 April, Hudson and Bess had dinner with Major Arthur Peuchen and Markland Molson. Loraine was also there for a short time. According to Peuchen, he and the others went to the "sitting-out room" after dinner and drank coffee. He remained with them until about 9:00pm.

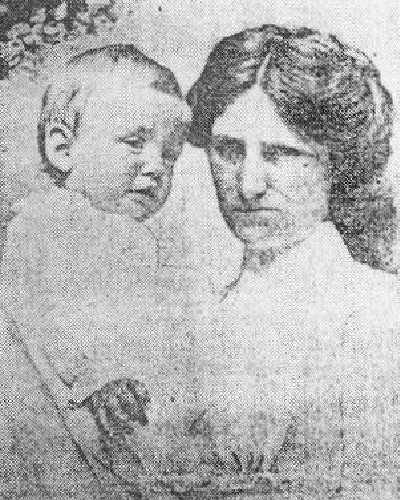
Brave Nurse and the Babe She Saved: Alice Cleaver with Trevor Allison (1912)

A few hours later, around 11:40pm, the Titanic struck an iceberg and started to take on water. According to witnesses interviewed for the United States Senate inquiry into the sinking of the Titanic, the order to rouse passengers from their cabins and instruct them to put on lifebelts and head to the boat deck came some time between midnight and 12:30am.

Over the years, there have been a number of conflicting accounts given about the Allisons' movements during the sinking. Most come from newspapers, some of which were written in very sensationalist ways and contained blatant errors, bringing their reliability into question. There are, however, some more detailed articles that quote Alice Cleaver and Sarah Daniels, as well as a letter written by Alice, which seem to coroborate one another to some degree. Still, it is impossible to know exactly what happened.

The most common narrative told is that Alice took Trevor to the boat deck without notifying the family, and the Allisons died while searching for him as they refused to get into a lifeboat without their baby. Another variation is that Bess and Loraine perished because Bess refused to leave her husband, who could not board a lifeboat because he was a man, choosing instead to die at his side.

Sarah gave a detailed account of her experience of the sinking to the Montreal Star on 19 April, after travelling from New York to Montreal with Allison relatives. She stated that she and Alice, who both shared a room with Trevor, had retired around 10:00pm.

"It was not so much the shock that awakened us as the terrible quivering of the ship. I jumped out of my berth and ran in my nightclothes out into the passageway. There was no one to be seen there, so I went back into the cabin to see what Miss Cleaver thought we had better do. We both were terrified, and after speaking with her for a moment, I went to the next room where Mr. and Mrs. Allison and the little girl were. I knocked, and Mr. Allison himself, still in his nightclothes, opened the door. I told him something terrible had happened to the ship, but he tried to reassure me, saying that everything would be all right and not to get excited. Then I ran back to my own cabin and told Nurse [Cleaver] that I was going to dress and go on deck to see what was the matter. Just about this time one of the stewardesses knocked at our door and told us to put on our clothes and go on deck.

Miss Cleaver, however, did not want to disturb the baby, who was sleeping soundly in his little crib, and asked me to go up first and come back and tell her what to do. In the meantime, she said, she would finish dressing and be ready on my return.

I hurriedly put on my clothes, and snatched my fur-lined overcoat from the rack, and ran out of the room when I met a steward who put a lifebelt around me. Before I reached the deck, I met a number of other passengers also making for outside and realized that we were in considerable danger from some cause or other. As I came on deck an officer took me by the arm and pulled me towards a boat some of the crew were engaged in lowering. I resisted, saying that I had to go back and warn nurse and Mr. and Mrs. Allison, but he said: “Never mind, they will be looked after. Get in the boat. There is no danger, but we don’t want to take any chances.""

In interview given shortly after she arrived in New York on the Carpathia, Alice also stated that the family had retired to their rooms by the time of the collision, and were awoken by it. She told reporters:

"Mr. Allison, partly dressed, had gone on deck. He soon came back and said there was no danger, but I kept on dressing. Then I heard how the engine started up, and I picked up some stuff and ran on deck with the baby in my arms. I had a warm fur carriage rug, in which I wrapped the little boy. When I got up on deck I was not allowed to go back to call Mr. and Mrs. Allison, but was told to go out on a lifeboat, which I did with the baby in my arms. I never saw Mr. nor Mrs. Allison after that. I do not know whether Mrs. Allison's little girl ever left her room or not."

In that article, Alice blamed the hurried launching of the lifeboats for the deaths of Bess and Loraine, claiming that the Allisons were waiting to board a lifeboat when it was suddenly lowered without them, leaving them standing at the railing. Since Alice stated in this article that she did not see them after leaving her cabin, the story of the Allisons' fate may have been told to her later by another passenger.

Other accounts by Alice and Sarah imply that the danger was thought to be less immediate than the above two descriptions would suggest. One newspaper report from the time quoted Alice as saying:

"We were all in bed when the Titanic struck, but we did not get up, for we never for a moment thought there was any danger. Then a little later we were told we had better get up, and I hurriedly dressed the baby. We went up on deck, and there were not one-quarter enough lifeboats. We got into the lifeboat just like the others, and we thought it was just a precaution, not because there was any danger."

Sarah similarly stated:

"I didn't even know that the engines had stopped when a maid came into my cabin and told me to get dressed quickly...I was so sleepy that as soon as the maid left the room, I got into bed again, and only began to dress when another girl came and aroused me. We all did as we were told. There was no excitement, and not knowing what had happened we were not alarmed."

In 1955, Alice (then Mrs. A. C. Williams) wrote about the events of that night in a letter to Walter Lord:

"I had some difficulty persuading Mr. Allison to get up and go to see what had happened after the crash, which they did not hear at all & thought it was my imagination. Some long time after the engines had stopped he decided to go and find out the trouble. While he was away I was warned we would have to leave the ship, so prepared the children & Mrs. Allison, but she became hysterical & I had to calm her. About that time an officer came to close the cabins & advised us to go on deck. We met Mr. Allison outside the cabin but he seemed too dazed to speak. I handed him some brandy & asked him to look after Mrs. Allison & Lorraine & I would keep Baby. The child I managed to get off the ship, some confusion occurred outside as to which deck we should go & that is how we became separated & afterward I heard from one of the staff that Mrs. Allison was hysterical again & that Mr. Allison had difficulty with her & I can only surmise that is how they lost their lives, as there was plenty of room in the lifeboats..."

In these accounts from Alice, she became separated from Hudson, Bess, and Loraine either before leaving the cabins or on the way to the boat deck. Somehow, after this separation, Alice and Trevor ended up on Lifeboat 11. Mildred Brown, the Allisons' cook, also boarded Lifeboat 11 after being urged by George Swane, the Allisons' chauffeur, to go up to the boat deck. Sarah would escape on Lifeboat 8. Lifeboat 8 launched on the port side around 1:00am, while Lifeboat 11 launched on the starboard site around 1:35am.

Major Peuchen, who dined with the Allisons earlier that evening, also gave several statements about when and where the Allisons were seen after the iceberg had been struck. The most repeated quote, which appears to have originally been published by the Montreal Star, is of Bess leaving a lifeboat to search for her husband:

"Mrs. Allison could have gotten away in perfect safety, but somebody told her that Mr. Allison was in a boat being lowered on the opposite side of the deck, and with Loraine she rushed away from the boat in which the infant and nurse had been placed. Apparently she had reached the other side to find that Mr. Allison was not there. Meanwhile our boat had put off.

Col. Archibald Gracie, in his 1913 book about the disaster, wrote that Eleanor Cassebeer told him and Hudson's uncle G. F. Johnston (misidentified as Bess' brother) that Bess and Loraine "refused to enter the lifeboat unless Mr. Allison was allowed to go with them."

Even if these are accurate, they were likely not first-hand accounts of Peuchen and Mrs. Cassebeer. Mrs. Cassebeer was rescued on Lifeboat 5, launched around 12:43am. This was more than 15 minutes before Lifeboat 8 was lowered carrying Sarah Daniels, who by her own account was the first of the Allison party to go up to the boat deck. Major Peuchen escaped on Lifeboat 6, which launched on the port side of the ship about ten minutes after Lifeboat 8, also on the port side. Lifeboat 11, carrying Alice and Trevor, launched on the opposite side of the ship about 25 minutes after Peuchen's lifeboat. If the Allisons did make it to a lifeboat with Alice and Trevor, in contradiction to Alice's account, Peuchen could not have witnessed it. In Peuchen's testimony for the U.S. inquiry, he mentioned that after helping to load Lifeboat 8, he saw "one or two" women on the port side of the ship who did not wish to leave their husbands. However, he denied seeing any women get in and then out of the lifeboats for that reason. Given that he was familiar with Bess and named her elsewhere in his testimony, it seems likely that if any of these women were her, he would have named her.

While the Allisons' movements are uncertain, even less is known about George Swane's. In a letter to her mother, written aboard the Carpathia, Mildred Brown said that sometime after the collision, George came to her cabin and made her go up to the boat deck. She repeated this statement to the Montreal Star, stating in both accounts that it was the last time she saw him.

Hudson, Bess, Loraine, and George ultimately perished in the sinking. Bess was one of only four first-class women (including Ida Straus, Edith Corse Evans, and Ann Elizabeth Isham) who perished, while Loraine was the only child of first and second class to do so. Memorial services for the Allisons were held at Douglas Methodist Church in Montreal and Trinity Methodist Church in Chesterville on 21 April and 28 April, respectively.

The Mackay-Bennett sailed from Halifax on 17 April 1912 to recover bodies from the site of the disaster. On 26 April, it was reported that Hudson's body was among those recovered. George's body was also found by the Mackay-Bennett. Both arrived back in Halifax on 30 April; they were bodies number 135 and 294. The fatality report for Hudson, completed by the Halifax Medical Examiner, described Hudson as wearing a heather coat, blue suit, and grey muffler. The effects found on his person were stated as:

"Keys, letters, and photos, stock book, three pocket diaries, one C.P.Railway ticket book, two pocket books, card case, $143.00 in notes, chain with insurance medals, 15:10:0 in gold, $100.00 Thomas Cook & Sons Travellers cheque, 35:0:0 in notes, gold cuff links; diamond solitaire ring, gold stud, knife, silver tie clip, a,d $4.40 in odd coins."

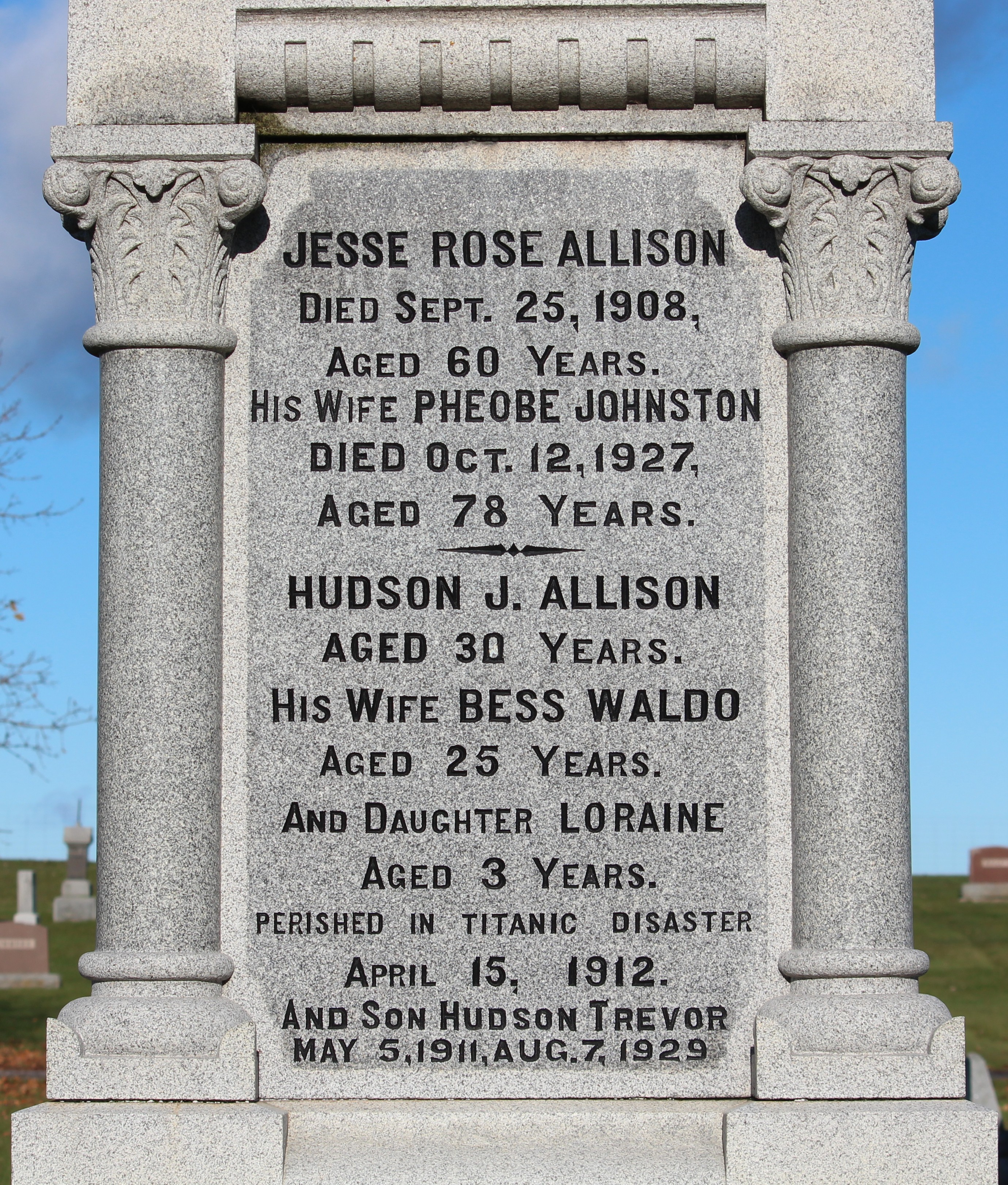
Allison Family Headstone at Maple Ridge Cemetery in Chesterville, Ontario, 2021

George's fatality report described him as:

"Sex- Male. Estimated age- 18. Dark hair.
Clothing: Blue suit, grey socks, low shoes.
Effects: Chain and sovereign case empty, 33/5 in cash, one tie pin, two motor licenses."

Hudson's uncle, G. F. Johnston, and brother, George B. R. Allison, were executors of the Allison estate. George B. Clarke, who worked for Johnston, McConnell & Allison, was sent to Halifax to identify and claim Hudson's remains. He, along with James S. Harding of Saint John, New Brunswick (a family friend of the Allisons), then accompanied the remains as they were sent by train on the CPR line to Montreal on 2 May. From Montreal to Chesterville, the remains were accompanied by: Hudson's brother and sister-in-law, G. B. Allison and wife Lillian; Hudson's uncle, G. F. Johnston; Bess' mother, Sarah Daniels; Rev. Dr. W. R. Young, pastor of the Douglas Methodist Church in Montreal; business partner J. W. McConnell; A. H. Vipond, an agent with the New York Life Insurance Co.; and businessman Joseph Patrick.

Hudson's body was buried in the family plot in Maple Ridge Cemetery in Chesterville. George's remains were interred at Fairview Lawn Cemetery in Halifax.

== Aftermath ==
Alice Cleaver, Sarah Daniels, Mildred Brown, and Trevor Allison were reunited on board the Carpathia. Upon the ship's arrival in New York City on the evening of 18 April 1912, the party was met by a number of Hudson's relatives. This included his brothers George and Percy, his uncle G. F. Johnston, and his cousin J. Wesley Allison. They stayed overnight at the Hotel Manhattan, then left for Montreal early the next morning aboard the Montreal Express on the Delaware and Hudson Railway.

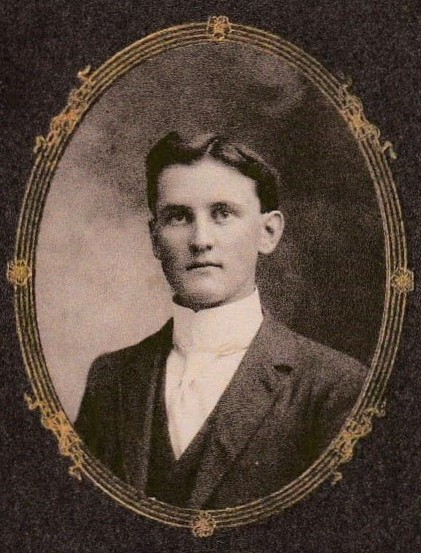
Hudson Trevor Allison, c. mid-1920s

When they arrived in Montreal, they were met at the station by a crowd of relatives and friends. They were taken in J. W. McConnell's automobile to his home on Bellevue Ave. in Westmount. Later that night, they went to the home of George Allison at 572 Roslyn Ave., Westmount. Alice, Sarah, and Mildred stayed at George's home for a period of time; on 30 April, Mildred wrote another letter to a friend, in which she remarked, "I suppose we shall stay here till we can make some clothes and get another place."

George Allison and his wife, Lillian, took custody of Trevor in the aftermath of the sinking. Trevor grew up in Montreal and graduated from Westmount High School in 1928. From 30 Aug 1928 to 26 Jun 1929, he attended the Royal Military College in Kingston, Ontario, which he detested. After completing one year there, he earned a Certificate of Military Qualification for Infantry, in which his rank was given as Gentleman Cadet.

He intended to start his studies at McGill University in Montreal in September 1929, but he never got the chance. While on vacation in Ocean Park, Maine, he fell victim to food poisoning and died on 7 August 1929, at the age of 18. His remains were transported to Chesterville and buried beside his father at Maple Ridge Cemetery.

Although most commonly referred to as Trevor, he went by the name Hudson; he signed a letter to a cousin in Chesterville with that name in 1929, was referred to as Hudson T. Allison when he entered the Royal Military College in 1928, and was called Hudson by the Chesterville Record in reporting about his death and funeral.

== Alice Cleaver identity ==
It has been claimed that Alice Cleaver, Trevor's nursemaid, was acquitted for the murder of her baby three years before she was hired by the Allisons. This claim was published in several books, including Don Lynch's Titanic: An Illustrated History (1992) and Alan Hustak's Titanic: The Canadian Story (1998). It also features prominently in the 1996 miniseries Titanic.

While there was an Alice Cleaver who murdered her child in 1909, she was not the same Alice Cleaver who was hired by the Allison family.

=== Alice Cleaver of Tottenham ===
In early March 1909, Alice Mary Cleaver (or Alice Emily Cleaver, depending on the source) of Tottenham, a laundress, was tried for the 20 January 1909 murder of her illegitimate ten-week-old son Reginald William Cleaver, who had been thrown onto the North London Railway tracks near Dalston Junction. On 9 March, she was sentenced to death for the crime, but a few days later, this was commuted to penal servitude for life. She was sent to Aylesbury Prison, where she appears in the 1911 UK Census. She remained in prison until 19 January 1915, when she was released. Therefore, this Alice was in prison at the time of the Titanic disaster.

The book From Workhouse to Prison to...the Titanic? (written by one of Alice Catherine Cleaver's children using the pseudonym Dinah Burnett) contains thorough, detailed research about Alice Cleaver of Tottenham, from her childhood through to her conviction, eventual release, and death.

=== Alice Catherine Cleaver, Titanic Survivor ===
Alice Catherine Cleaver, Trevor's nursemaid, was born on 5 July 1889 in the district of St Pancras in London, England. She may have been born at 42 Marquis Road, a terraced house in Kentish Town, where the family was residing when she was baptized at St. Thomas Church in Agar Town on 24 November of that year. She was the eldest daughter of Joseph Cleaver, a postman, and Lavinia Alice Thomas. The family was still residing at 42 Marquis Road at the time of the 1891 UK Census, but by 1895 had moved to 127 Torriano Avenue, also in Kentish Town. By 11 January 1897, when Alice was admitted to Brecknock School, the family was residing at 86 Marquis Road, where they would remain until at least 1901.

In April 1911, Alice was working as a nurse in the home of Sir Percy and May Louise (née Ashman) Sargent, 67A Harley Street, Marylebone. Percy was a surgeon at the National Hospital in London, while May was the daughter of Sir Herbert Ashman, 1st Baronet and first Lord Mayor of Bristol. Alice was caring for their two young children: Nancie, aged 3 years, and John, aged several months.

Alice was hired by the Allison family in March 1912 to act as a nursemaid to their son Trevor. Some time after the Titanic disaster, she returned to England.

On 22 Jun 1918, Alice, 28, married Edward James Williams at All Saints Church in Tufnell Park, Islington. Williams, 27, was a clerk from West Kensington. In 1921, the couple was living together at 124 Baker St. in London, at which time Edward was a manager in the aritifical limb industry, working for Horace V. Duncan. They later had two sons: David (b. 1922) and John (b. 1925). Edward died on 1 April 1935 in Bath, Somerset. In 1955, she wrote to Walter Lord about her experience on the Titanic with the Allisons using the name Mrs. A. C. Williams. Alice died on 1 November 1984 in Winchester, Hampshire, at the age of 95. On 8 November 1984, the London Times announced her death:

WILLIAMS, Mrs. A. C. (nee Cleaver) F.I.B.S.T., survivor of the "Titanic" peacefully on 1st November aged 95 at her home in Winchester.

F.I.B.S.T. may stand for Fellow of the Institute of British Surgical Technicians.

== Helen Loraine Kramer ==
=== Claim ===
In early September 1940, newspapers began reporting that a woman calling herself Helen Loraine Kramer was claiming to be Loraine Allison. According to Kramer, her foster father (only referred to as Mr. Hyde) told her that he was on the Titanic, and as he was about to get into a lifeboat, a man identifying himself as H. J. Allison of Pennsylvania thrust Kramer into his arms and asked him to take care of the child, who he identified as Loraine. Her story was reported on from coast to coast and gained so much attention that she appeared on a CBS radio program called "We, the People" on 10 September 1940. It would later be said that Kramer also claimed that Mr. Hyde was Thomas Andrews. Her claims were rejected by the Allison family. Eventually, her story fell out of the public eye and she ceased trying to contact the Allisons.

Around 2012 (the 100th anniversary of the sinking), Kramer's granddaughter, Debrina Woods, began to pursue her grandmother's claims. She originally intended to spread Kramer's ashes around the Allison monument at Maple Ridge Cemetery in Chesterville and eventually write a tell-all book about her grandmother and the Allisons.

=== Loraine Allison Identification Project ===
In response to Woods' persistence, the Loraine Allison Identification Project was established. It was led by Tracy Oost, a forensic scientist and professor at Laurentian University in Sudbury, Ontario, with the help of Allison and Kramer relatives.

In December 2013, the Loraine Allison Identification Project announced the results of the mitochondrial DNA testing performed on a sample donated by a female-line descendant of Kramer and a female-line descendant of Bess' sister Maybelle. The test was performed by DNA Diagnostics Center, a facility accredited by the American Society of Crime Laboratory Directors. The results were negative, demonstrating that no genetic relationship existed between Kramer and Loraine Allison.

=== Helen Kramer Identity ===
Mrs. Kramer was known by many names during her lifetime. For clarity, she will be referred to here as Kramer.

Kramer's birthname was likely Sophia or Sofia Schultz; her middle name may have been Irene. She was born around 1902 to Thomas Schultz and Mary Lacek. Various records from her early life give her birthplace as Poland, Russia, and Russian Poland. Census records suggest that she immigrated to the United States around 1907 or 1910.

Going by the name Sofia Shultz, she appeared in the 1910 US Federal Census with her parents and younger brothers Julian and Theodore. The family, described as Polish but all born in Russia, were renting a home in Ironwood, Michigan, at 309 East Ayer St. Her father was working as a mason, and Kramer, 7, was attending school. Her father died sometime between 1910 and 1918, and her mother remarried to Michael Wronski or Wronske on 22 January 1918 in Detroit. When the next federal census was taken in January 1920, the family (consisting of Sophia, her mother, stepfather, brothers Julian and Theodore, and half-sister Annette) was living at 170 30th St. in Detroit. Her younger brothers, Louis Julian and Theodore Charles, were called Julian and Theodore in early census records, but both used their other names (Louis and Charles) during adulthood, which may explain why Kramer was called Sofia/Sophia in the 1910 and 1920 Censuses, but Irene in later records.

On 28 November 1920, Kramer swallowed poison in an attempt to take her life. Newspapers, describing her as 18-year-old Irene Scholtz of 170 30th St., reported that she did so because she hadn't seen her lover, Lester Walsh, in several days and believed her affections had been spurned. She was taken to a hospital in Detroit and recovered. She attempted suicide again on 7 February 1921; she wrote letters to her family and intended to drown herself in a river, but was stopped before she could get there. She claimed that she was pregnant and that Walsh, who she described as abusive, had abandoned her. There is no record of a child being born to her in the following nine months. The reporting of the second incident mentions her mother, who lived at 4112 30th St., and a sister Lorraine, though no record of a Lorraine Schultz has been found. Kramer, under the name of Irene Schultz, was living at this address in Polk's 1921-1922 directory of Detroit, which was published in February 1922.

Kramer had a child with Lester Walsh on 27 July 1922; his name was Lester John Walsh, though he also used the middle name Leo in adulthood. Kramer's name on his birth record is Irene Evangeline Schultz and her birthplace is stated as Russia. Six months later, Kramer married Polish immigrant Stanley Witkowski on 30 December 1922, using the name Irene Schultz. Her birthplace is listed as Poland, and Kramer's mother and stepfather were the witnesses. She had two children with Witkowski: Stanley C. (born 12 Feb 1924) and Eugene Maxwell (born 28 Nov 1925). Stanley Jr. died on 12 November 1927 after being hit by a car; at that time, Kramer's name was stated as Irene Schultz and her birthplace as Russian Poland. Reporting of the negligent homicide case that followed includes a photo of Kramer. On 1 May 1928, Kramer's husband filed for divorce, citing extreme cruelty as the cause. Their son Eugene, aged 2, was the only child listed on the divorce paperwork. Kramer was about one month pregnant when the divorce was filed, and she gave birth to a son, James Lewis (also spelled Louis) on 6 January 1929. The divorce was granted on 11 February 1929. After the divorce, Eugene took on the surname Walsh.

Neither Kramer nor her children have been found in the 1930 US Federal Census. Around this time, she was in a relationship with Beecher Ferguson; a daughter, Adell Dorothy Ferguson, was born to them on 21 September 1930. Kramer's son James also used the surname Ferguson and stated Beecher to be his father on his death record and Social Security paperwork, though the Social Security file notes that James had previously used the surnames Kramer and Walsh. Kramer and Ferguson's relationship ended sometime before 1934.

On 10 November 1934, Kramer married Lawrence Carroll Kramer in Bloomfield Hills, Michigan. Her name was given as Evangeline I. Hyde, and she was stated to have been born in England to James Hyde and Evangeline Lee. This appears to be the first use of this name in any records. The Kramers had two children, Patricia Julie (born 21 Jul 1935) and John Lawrence (12 Jul 1937), both of whom were born in Berkley, Michigan. Kramer, Lawrence, Eugene, James, Patricia, and John appear together in the 1940 US Federal Census in Berkley, Michigan, at which time Kramer used the name Evangeline and stated that she was born in England. The year prior to the census, when Kramer's son Lester applied for a marriage license in 1939, he listed his mother as Evangeline Irene Lee Hyde, born in Calumet, Michigan.

About five months after the census was taken, Kramer made her claim. In one article from the time, she mentions growing up in Ironwood, Michigan, which is consistent with the 1910 Census. From that point forward, most of her children stated their mother to be some variation of Evangeline Hyde or Helen Allison in various records. In the next federal census (1950), Kramer used the name Helen L. Kramer and gave her birthplace as Canada French (Quebec). Kramer died on 26 March 1992 in Sacramento County, California. Her death record and Social Security paperwork both use the name Helen Loraine Kramer and Loraine Allison's birth information, and list her parents as Hudson J. Allison and Bess W. Daniels.

== In media ==
A 1912 German silent film about the disaster, In Nacht und Eis (In Night and Ice), includes the Allison family story, but not by name.

The Allisons were featured in Danielle Steel's 1991 novel, No Greater Love.

The Allisons were major characters in the 1996 miniseries Titanic. The subplot regarding them was highly fictionalized and filled with historical inaccuracies: notably, it perpetuated the long-standing myth that Alice was a child murderess, depicting her as an emotionally unstable young woman with premonitions of disaster, who then sees the opportunity to rescue baby Trevor from the sinking ship as a saving grace from her tumultuous past, thus forcing the rest of the family to remain on the ship looking for him, not knowing he is safe. The other servants (Sarah, Mildred and George) are omitted.

The Allisons and Cleaver are also portrayed in the 2012 miniseries Titanic.

=== Portrayals ===
| Character | Titanic (1996) | Titanic (2012) |
|---|---|---|
| Bess Allison | Harley Jane Kozak | Olivia Darnley |
| Hudson J. Allison | Kevin Conway | Preston Hrisko |
| Loraine Allison | Devon Hoholuk | Larina Meszaros |
| Alice Cleaver | Felicity Waterman | Izabella Urbanowicz |

== Family Trees ==
Allison Family Tree

Andrew Allison c.1804–1892 | Jannet Richey c.1805–1864 | Isaac Johnston; 1817–1901 | Margaret Humphries; 1828–1911
Jesse Rose Allison; 1848–1908 | Phoebe Johnston; 1849–1927 | George Franklin Johnston; 1861–1931
Margaret Rachel Allison; 1876–1945 | George Barber Richey Allison; 1879–1933 | Hudson Joshua Creighton Allison; 1881–1912 | Bessie Waldo Daniels; 1886–1912 | William Percival "Percy" Allison; 1887–1967
Helen Loraine Allison; 1909–1912 | Hudson Trevor Allison; 1911–1929

Daniels Family Tree

Joseph Daniels | Susan Fisher | John Adams | Eunice Moulton
Fisher Daniels; 1796–1874 | Eunice Adams; 1795–1827
Waldo Daniels c.1827–1886 | Helen Rowena Gilmore; 1825–1920
Mary L. Bowden c.1854–1874 | Arville Fisher Daniels; 1851–1935
Myrtle Rowena Daniels; 1873–1943 | Maybelle Helen Daniels; 1883–1962

Andrew Gilmore | Hannah Makepeace
Marcus Gilmore; 1797–1865
James McCully c.1834–1909
Sarah J. McCully c.1858–1935
Hudson Joshua Creighton Allison; 1881–1912 | Bessie Waldo Daniels; 1886–1912
Helen Loraine Allison; 1909–1912 | Hudson Trevor Allison; 1911–1929

Titus Smith
Atarah Smith; 1797–1865
Rose Dixon c.1834–1912

Atarah Hamant
