= Kilgour =

Family name

Kilgour is a surname of Scottish origin. Notable people with the surname include:

- Darris Kilgour (fl. 1992–2014), American lacrosse player and coach
- David Kilgour (born 1941), Canadian politician
- David Kilgour (musician) (fl. 1978–2014), New Zealand musician (The Clean)
- Don Kilgour (born 1946), Australian politician
- Fred Kilgour (1914–2006), American librarian
- Hamish Kilgour (fl. 1978–2014), New Zealand musician (The Clean)
- Joseph Kilgour (1863–1933), Canadian actor
- Kirk Kilgour (1947–2002), American volleyball player
- Lennox Kilgour (1927–2004), Trinidad & Tobago weightlifter
- Niall Kilgour (fl. 1968–2004), British naval officer
- Mary Stewart Kilgour (1851–1955), British suffragist and writer
- Maggie Kilgour (born 1957), Canadian academic and author
- Nancy Kilgour (1904–1954), Australian painter
- Rab Kilgour (born 1956), Scottish football player
- Rich Kilgour (born 1969), American lacrosse player
- Robert Kilgour (1714–1790), Scottish Episcopal Church minister
- William Kilgour (1878–1935), New Zealand sportsman

== See also ==
- Marc Kilgour, fictional character in the Henderson's Boys series of books
- Kilgour, a former church in the parish of Falkland, Fife, Scotland
