= William Hobart Molson =

William Hobart Molson (January 1888 – November 1951) was a Canadian entrepreneur, philanthropist and member of the well-known Molson family.

His family name is associated with Molson Bank, Molson Brewery, and various business interests including early railroads and shipping. He was the only son of Dr. William Alexander Molson and Esther Shepherd. During World War I, he joined the Canadian Expeditionary Force, spending some months in the 20th Reserve Battalion in England before being posted to the 42nd Battalion (Royal Highlanders of Canada) in France. He achieved the rank of Captain, and was awarded the Military Cross for gallantry in action on 26 August 1918 during the Battle of Arras. He was one of thirty-four Molson family members to serve in World War I: five were killed and thirteen wounded.

He moved to Victoria, British Columbia in 1925 with his wife and their son, Andrew. In 1926, she died giving birth to their second son, David. He served from 1926 to 1931 as Aide-de-Camp to the Lieutenant Governor of British Columbia, Robert Randolph Bruce. In 1931, he married Bruce's niece, Madge Mackenzie, who had acted as her uncle's hostess. Two daughters were the issue of this marriage.

Apart from service in the Royal Canadian Air Force in World War II, Molson led a quiet life. He continued to act as Aide-de-Camp until his death in November 1951 at the age of 63 years.
