= Titanic (1996 miniseries) =

- Promotional poster
- Written by: Ross LaManna; Joyce Eliason
- Directed by: Robert Lieberman
- Starring: Peter Gallagher; George C. Scott; Catherine Zeta-Jones; Eva Marie Saint; Tim Curry; Harley Jane Kozak; Marilu Henner
- Music by: Lennie Niehaus
- Countries of origin: United States; Canada
- Original language: English

Production
- Producers: Harold Lee Tichenor; Rocky Lang
- Cinematography: David Hennings
- Editor: Tod Feuerman
- Running time: 173 minutes
- Budget: $13 million

Original release
- Network: CBS
- Release: November 17, 1996

Titanic is a 1996 American two-part television miniseries which premiered on CBS on November 17, 1996. Starring Catherine Zeta-Jones in one of her first major roles, along with Peter Gallagher, it follows three main story threads, involving fictional and historical characters aboard the RMS Titanic during her doomed 1912 maiden voyage. The miniseries was directed by Robert Lieberman. The original music score was composed by Lennie Niehaus. It is the first cinematic portrayal to depict the ship breaking in two, as all previous films depicted the ship sinking intact. It was criticized for its script and numerous historical errors.

== Plot ==
In London, young pickpocket Jamie Perse steals a ticket to board Titanic in third class. He join forces with steward Simon Doonan, a hard-bitten criminal determined to rob first class passengers. In first class is the Allison family, a family returning home to Montreal with their two small children and new nurse, Alice Cleaver. They gradually become wary and suspicious of her neurotic behavior. Isabella Paradine is traveling in first class to join her husband after attending her aunt's funeral in the United Kingdom. She finds that her former lover, self-made millionaire Wynn Park, is joining the voyage. She falls in love with him again, and after a brief affair, she sends her husband a wireless saying they can no longer be together (despite having a daughter). Mrs Allison's maid asks her if she saw Alice in Cairo the previous month, and realizes that she remembers her from a highly publicized trial where Alice was accused of throwing her baby off a train.

Jamie is drawn to Aase (pronounced "Osa") Ludvigsen, a recent Christian convert and missionary. Aase is brutally raped and beaten by Doonan, causing her to lose her faith and will to live. When the Titanic hits the iceberg and starts sinking, Alice panics and quickly boards a lifeboat with Trevor, the Allisons' infant son. The parents and their small daughter are unaware that the baby is safe and refuse to leave the ship without him. Isabella reluctantly leaves Wynn when he forces her to board a lifeboat. Jamie manages to get Aase into Isabella's boat. Isabella confesses a long kept secret to Wynn that her daughter Claire is actually Wynn's. Unbeknownst to them, Doonan also sneaks aboard that same boat, disguised as a woman. Smith remains on the bridge, preparing to go down with the ship, as he mutters "Forgive me" to a picture of his wife and daughter. After the ship sinks, Aase is knocked off the lifeboat by Doonan after she recognizes him, and he attempts to hold the passengers in the boat hostage at gunpoint, but Officer Lowe, who is in charge of the boat, hits Doonan in the head with an oar, killing him and sending his body into the water. Jamie himself manages to survive when he accidentally falls into one of the last lifeboats to be launched before the Titanic sinks. Later on board the RMS Carpathia, Isabella is grief-stricken when she finds Wynn's lifeless body on deck. Jamie decides to start over after he finds Aase in the makeshift hospital aboard the Carpathia. Upon arriving in New York City, the couple plan to start a new life together. Trevor is reunited with his family while the unstable Alice is treated as a hero, and Isabella is reunited with her family, who are blissfully unaware of Isabella's tryst because the telegram was never sent out due to the sinking.

== Cast ==
=== Fictional characters ===
| Actor | Role |
|---|---|
| Peter Gallagher | Wynn Park |
| Catherine Zeta-Jones | Isabella Paradine |
| Eva Marie Saint | Hazel Foley |
| Tim Curry | Simon Doonan |
| Mike Doyle | Jamie Perse |
| Sonsee Neu | Aase Ludvigsen |
| Tamsin Kelsey | Clarinda Jack |
| Eric Keenleyside | Black Billy Jack |
| Katharine Isabelle | Ophelia Jack |
| Lachlan Murdoch | Perry Jack |
| Doug Abrahams | Bartender Thomas Joe McCormack |
| Shaina Tianne Unger | Claire Paradine |
| Dale Wilson | Edward Paradine |
| Hagan Beggs | Alden Foley |
| Molly Parker | Lulu Foley |
| Crystal Verge | Marge Miller |
| Don MacKay | Mr. Dickie |
| Kim Kondrashoff | Crewman At Steerage Gate |
| Tina Fiorda | Italian Woman |
| Brent Stait | Irish Bunkmate |

=== Historical characters ===
| Actor | Role |
|---|---|
| George C. Scott | Captain Edward John Smith |
| Roger Rees | J. Bruce Ismay |
| Harley Jane Kozak | Bess Allison |
| Kevin Conway | Hudson J. Allison |
| Devon Hoholuk | Loraine Allison |
| Marilu Henner | Margaret "Molly" Brown |
| Felicity Waterman | Alice Cleaver |
| Malcolm Stewart | First Officer William McMaster Murdoch |
| Kevin McNulty | Second Officer Charles Lightoller |
| Gerard Plunkett | Fourth Officer Joseph Boxhall |
| Kavan Smith | Fifth Officer Harold Lowe |
| Scott Hylands | John Jacob Astor IV |
| Janne Mortil | Madeleine Astor |
| Barry Pepper | Second Wireless Operator Harold Bride |
| Matt Hill | Chief Wireless Operator Jack Phillips |
| Byron Lucas | Lookout Frederick Fleet |
| Aaron Pearl | Lookout Reginald Robinson Lee |
| Richard Lautsch | Lookout George Alfred Hogg |
| Janie Woods-Morris | Ida Straus |
| Peter Haworth | Isidor Straus |
| Martin Evans | Robert Hichens |
| Stephen Dimopoulos | Joseph Bell |
| Barry Cuffling | First Class Steward Henry Samuel Etches |
| Terence Kelly | Captain Arthur Rostron |
| Chris Humphreys | First Officer Horace John Dean |
| Unidentified extra | Wireless Operator Harold Cottam |
| Matthew Walker | Captain Stanley Lord |
| Ron Halder | Second Officer Herbert Stone |
| Eric Schneider | Third Officer Charles Victor Groves |
| Gavin Craig | Wireless Operator Cyril Furmstone Evans |

Cast notes:

- Steven Spielberg took notice of Zeta-Jones in Titanic and recommended her for The Mask of Zorro (1998).
- Scott and Rees had previously acted together in A Christmas Carol, which also starred David Warner (who appeared in S.O.S. Titanic (1979) and James Cameron's 1997 Titanic film)

== Production ==
The original script had a working class British man named Alex and an wealthy American named Suzanne. The family of Sidney Leslie Goodwin were included (replaced in the filmed version by the fictional Jacks) and the near collision with the SS New York was included in the original script.

== Reception ==
The New York Daily News commented on the fact that the acting was substandard and the ship's operators and owner are portrayed "about as sympathetically as those connected with the Exxon Valdez." The Seattle Post-Intelligencer also referenced the "embarrassingly bad acting" and out of place scenes.

Titanic was criticized for its numerous inaccuracies. Some people like shipbuilder Thomas Andrews, Sixth Officer James Paul Moody, and Chief Officer Henry Tingle Wilde are omitted, with Boxhall replacing Moody and Smith noting the iceberg damage to the ship in place of Andrews. The series depicts Alice Cleaver as having been convicted of killing her own child. Other than having similar names, Alice Mary Cleaver and Alice Catherine Cleaver were two different people.

=== Awards ===
Titanic received an Emmy Award for Outstanding Sound Mixing for a Drama Miniseries or a Special. It was also nominated for Outstanding Costume Design for a Miniseries or a Special.

| Year | Category | Nominee(s) | Result |
|---|---|---|---|
| 1997 | Outstanding Sound Mixing for a Drama Miniseries or a Special | David Husby, David E. Fluhr, Adam Jenkins, Don Digirolamo for part 1 | Won |
| 1997 | Outstanding Costume Design for a Miniseries or a Special | Joe I. Tompkins, Jori Woodman | Nominated |

== See also ==
- List of films about the RMS Titanic
