= William Workman (Canadian politician) =

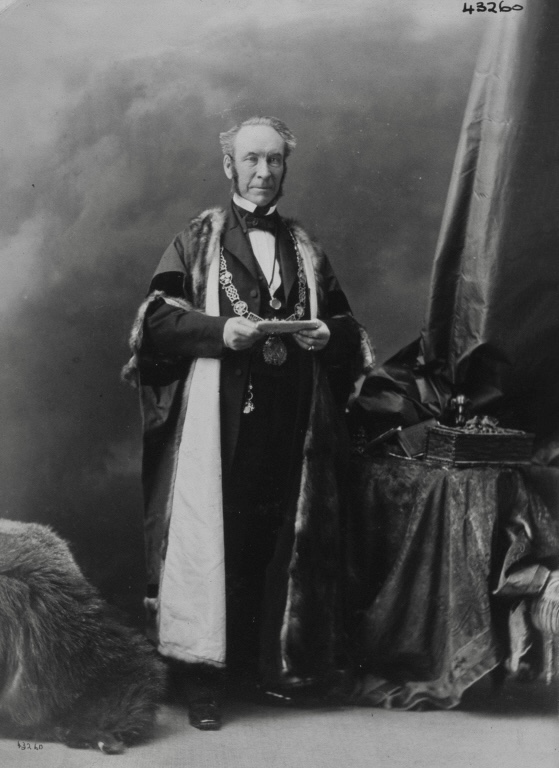

12th Mayor of Montreal
- In office 1868–1871
- Preceded by: Henry Starnes
- Succeeded by: Charles Coursol

Personal details
- Born: May 1807 Ballymacash, County Antrim, Ireland
- Died: 23 February 1878 (aged 70) Montreal, Quebec, Canada
- Resting place: Mount Royal Cemetery
- Profession: businessman

William Workman (May 1807 – 23 February 1878), of Mount Prospect House, Montreal, was an Irish-born Canadian entrepreneur, businessman and philanthropist. He was a partner in Canada's largest wholesale hardware house of Frothingham & Workman, and President of Montreal's City Bank. He was Mayor of Montreal and invested in railways, shipping, real estate and charity. His home was in Montreal's Golden Square Mile and he is buried at Mount Royal Cemetery.

== Ireland to Montreal ==
In 1807, William Workman was born at his family's 'handsome cottage' in Ballymacash, County Antrim. The Workmans were said to have once been wealthy, but the family's fortunes had declined. William was the son of Joseph Workman (b.1759), of Ballymacash, and his wife Catherine Gowdy, daughter of Alexander Gowdy, land steward to Squire Johnson of Ballymacash. In 1787, his father emigrated with a brother, Benjamin, to North America. Benjamin secured the position of Professor of Mathematics at the University of Pennsylvania and Joseph worked under him as a tutor of mathematics.

Joseph left Philadelphia in 1790 and sailed to London, with the aim of patenting an improvement to the mariner's compass, invented by Benjamin, but only to find that the mechanic who had made some the parts had fraudulently patented it as his own. Returning to Ballymacash, Squire Johnson appointed him to be the new schoolmaster, where he met William's mother, Catherine Gowdy. Joseph replaced his father-in-law as land steward and Johnson appointed him clerk of the peace. William grew up at Ballymacash and mastered the skills for employment with the Ordnance Survey of Ireland from 1827 to 1829, when his parents took him to Montreal to join his brothers, the eldest of whom had emigrated there in 1819.

== Business career ==
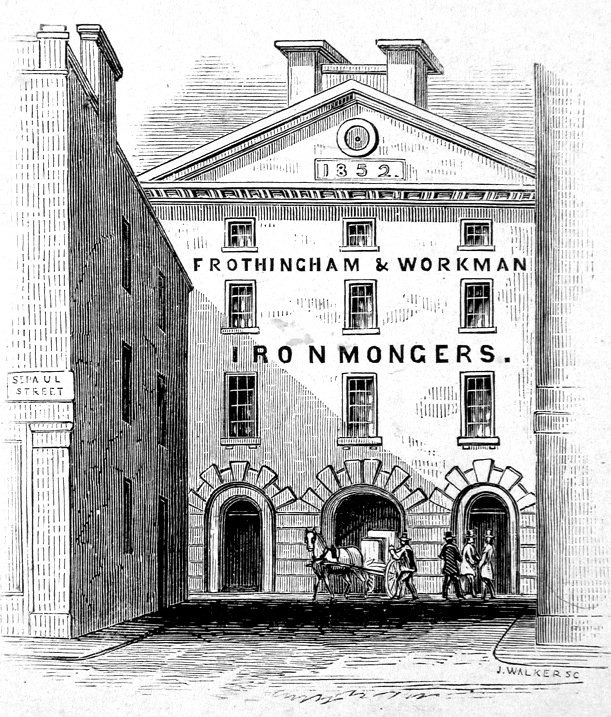
Premises of Frothingham & Workman, 1852

William Workman's first employment was working on the newspapers, Canadian Courant and Montreal Advertiser, owned by his brother, Benjamin. In 1830, he joined another brother, Thomas, in the wholesale hardware house of John Frothingham. By 1836, the Workmans had become full partners, indicating that they had brought some capital into the firm. As well as handling imported items, Frothingham and Workman manufactured some hardware in their Montreal factories which employed hundreds of men. Workman would remain in partnership with Frothingham until his retirement in 1859, and under them it would become Canada's largest tool and hardware wholesale business.

He invested in Canada's first railway, the Champlain and St. Lawrence, completed in 1836 and serving as a director. He was one of the largest shareholders in the St Lawrence and Atlantic Railroad when the line was taken over by the Grand Trunk Railway in 1854. By the 1840s, Workman was a very wealthy man. In 1842, he built an impressive mansion in Montreal's Golden Square Mile, which he named 'Mount Prospect'. He had considerable property elsewhere in Montreal, particularly on the western outskirts. From 1849 to 1874, he served as President of Montreal's City Bank. In 1854, he ventured into shipping with several prominent Montreal businessmen, including the Torrances, establishing the Canadian Ocean Steam Navigation Company. A year later, Workman purchased two large steamboats for the St Lawrence trade.

== Public life ==
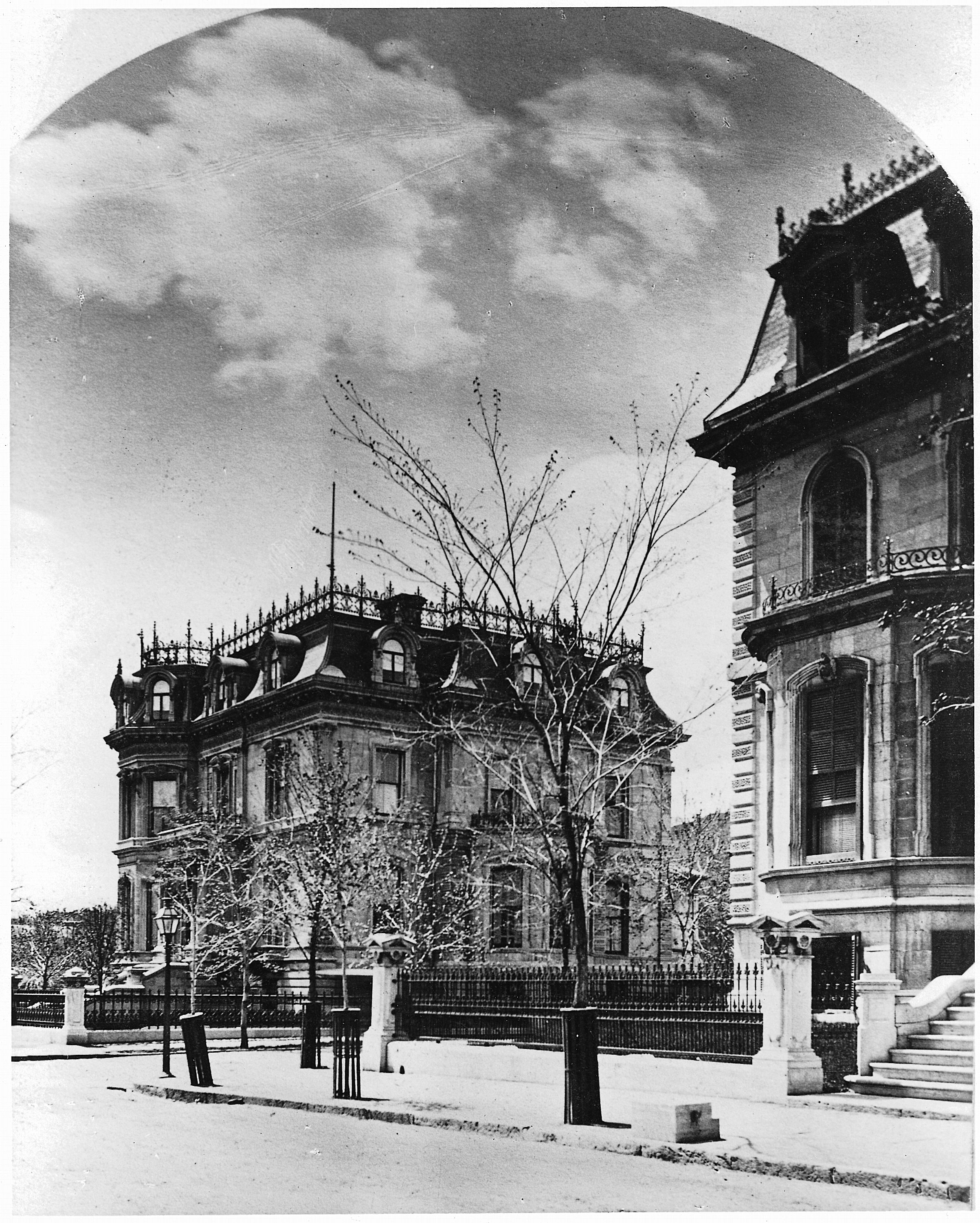
'Mount Prospect House', William Workman's home, built in 1842 within the Golden Square Mile

When he retired from Frothingham & Workman in 1859, he took an active interest in public affairs. Since the 1840s, as a manufacturer and leader of the Association for the Promotion of Canadian Industry, Workman had been in favour of high protective tariffs. As a banker, he strongly disagreed with the government's proposed measures to widen its fiscal powers during the late 1860s, and in 1866 he attacked Sir Alexander Tilloch Galt's recommendations for tariff reductions, fearing it would bring "beggary or emigration" for many Canadians.

He never attempted to enter politics, but following Confederation he took an active interest in federal affairs. Workman was best known in Montreal for his municipal political activity and his local philanthropy. He was nominated for mayor 1868, running against Jean-Louis Beaudry. Beaudry made serious allegations of corruption against Workman in an attempt to win, which led to Workman being disqualified. However, found to be innocent of these false charges, he was allowed back in the race and easily defeated Beaudry in the elections. He proved so popular that he was re-elected by acclamation in 1869 and again in 1870.

Previously, Workman had been president of the St. Patrick's Society of Montreal before it became an exclusively Roman Catholic organization in 1856. From then he focused on the Irish Protestant Benevolent Society, giving much of his time and money to the cause. He helped to establish the Montreal Protestant House of Industry and Refuge in 1864, serving as its president from 1874 to 1877. In his will, he left the institution a legacy of $20,000. To encourage saving among the city's workingmen, Workman helped to found the Montreal City and District Savings Bank in 1846, serving as the bank's first president (1846–52), and as a director from 1861 to 1872.

== Family and last years ==
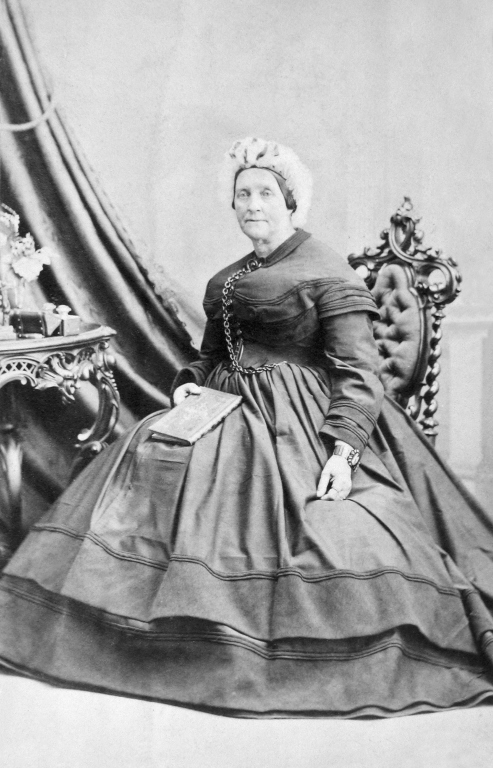
Mrs Eliza (Bethell) Workman

In 1831, at Montreal, Workman married Eliza Bethell (1805–1885). They were the parents of eight children, but only two daughters lived to adulthood,

- Louise Frothingham Workman (1834–1889), was married at Mount Prospect House in 1854 to Joel Clapp Baker (1827–1903), of Montreal. He was the son of The Hon. William Baker, of Dunham, Quebec, and his wife Harriet Clapp (1790–1868). They died without children.
- Eliza Workman (1843–1871), was the first wife from 1866 of Robert Moat (1839–1899), of Moat Park, Dunmurry, County Antrim, and afterwards Montreal. They were the parents of at least one son, Major William Moat (1867–1941), O.B.E., of Johnson Hall, Staffordshire, who married Sybil Frances Spencer, great-granddaughter of Francis Spencer, 1st Baron Churchill.

Workman was greatly affected by the loss of so many of his children. He had been an adherent of the Unitarian Church, but according to one source he later found solace in Roman Catholicism. He turned increasingly to private worship and had a family chapel added to his mansion house. After he died, his wife retired to Ocean House, Cape Elizabeth, Maine (which may have been her childhood home), where she died. All of the Workman family are buried together at Mount Royal Cemetery.

== Gallery ==
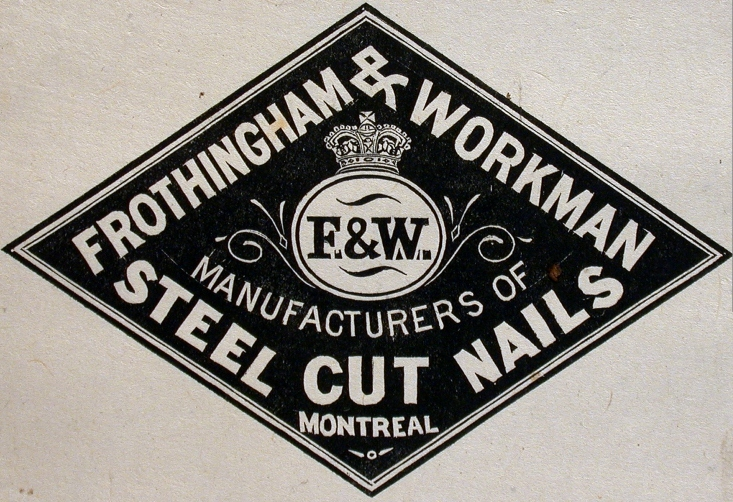

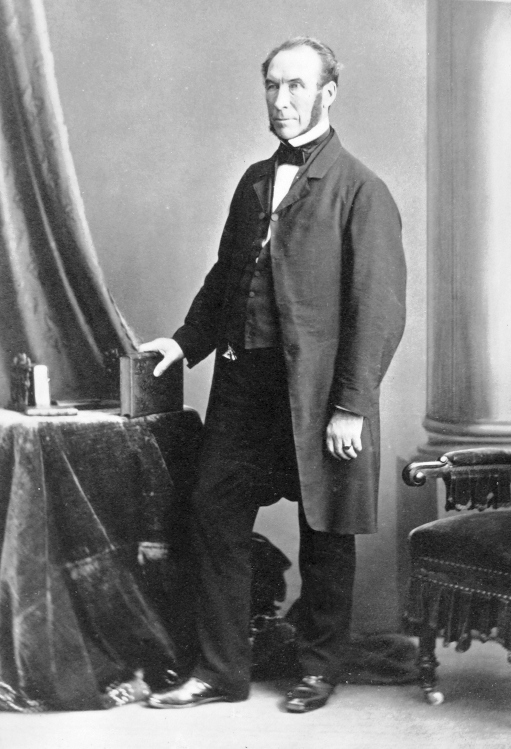

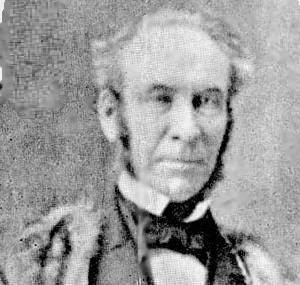

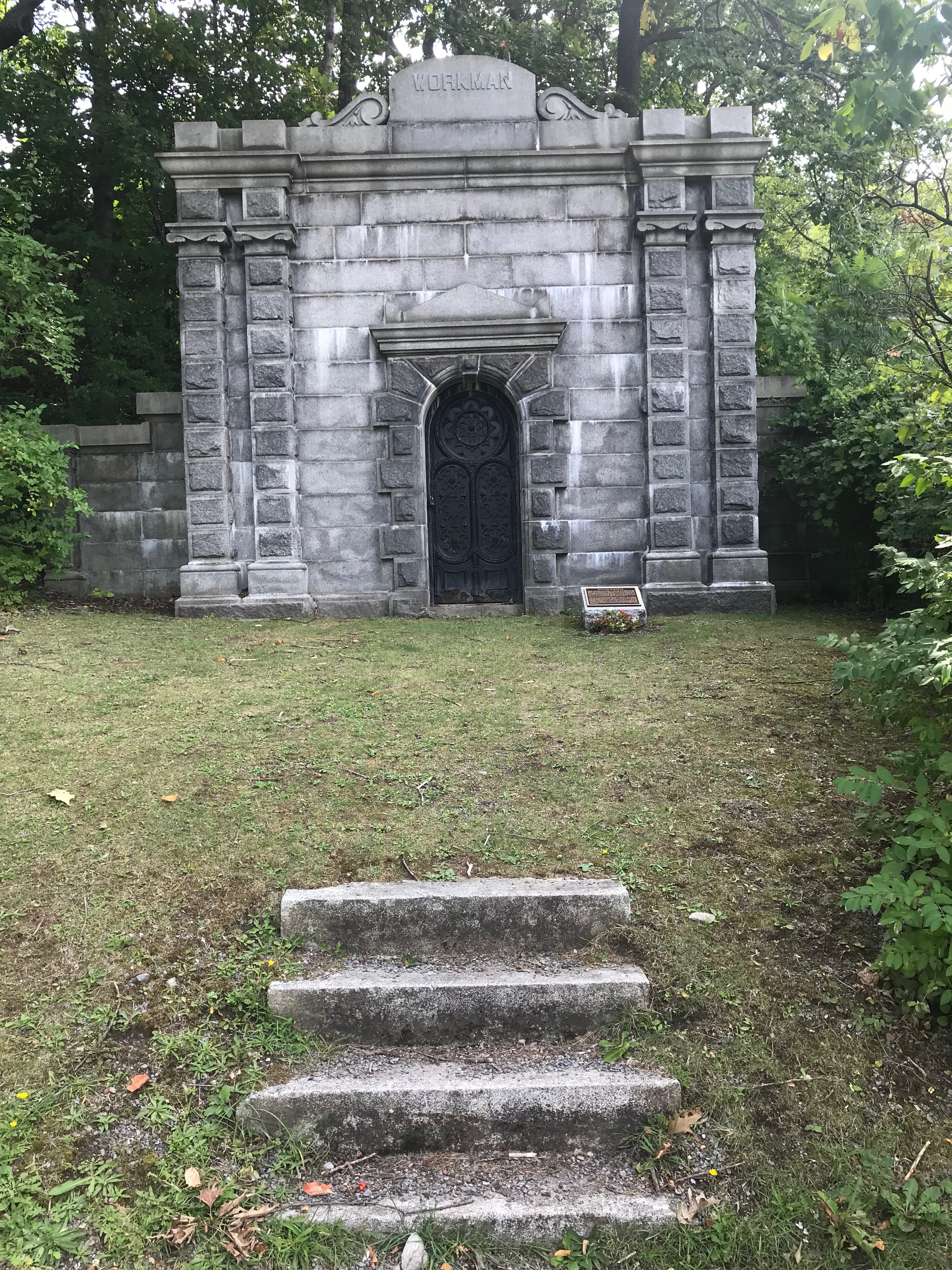

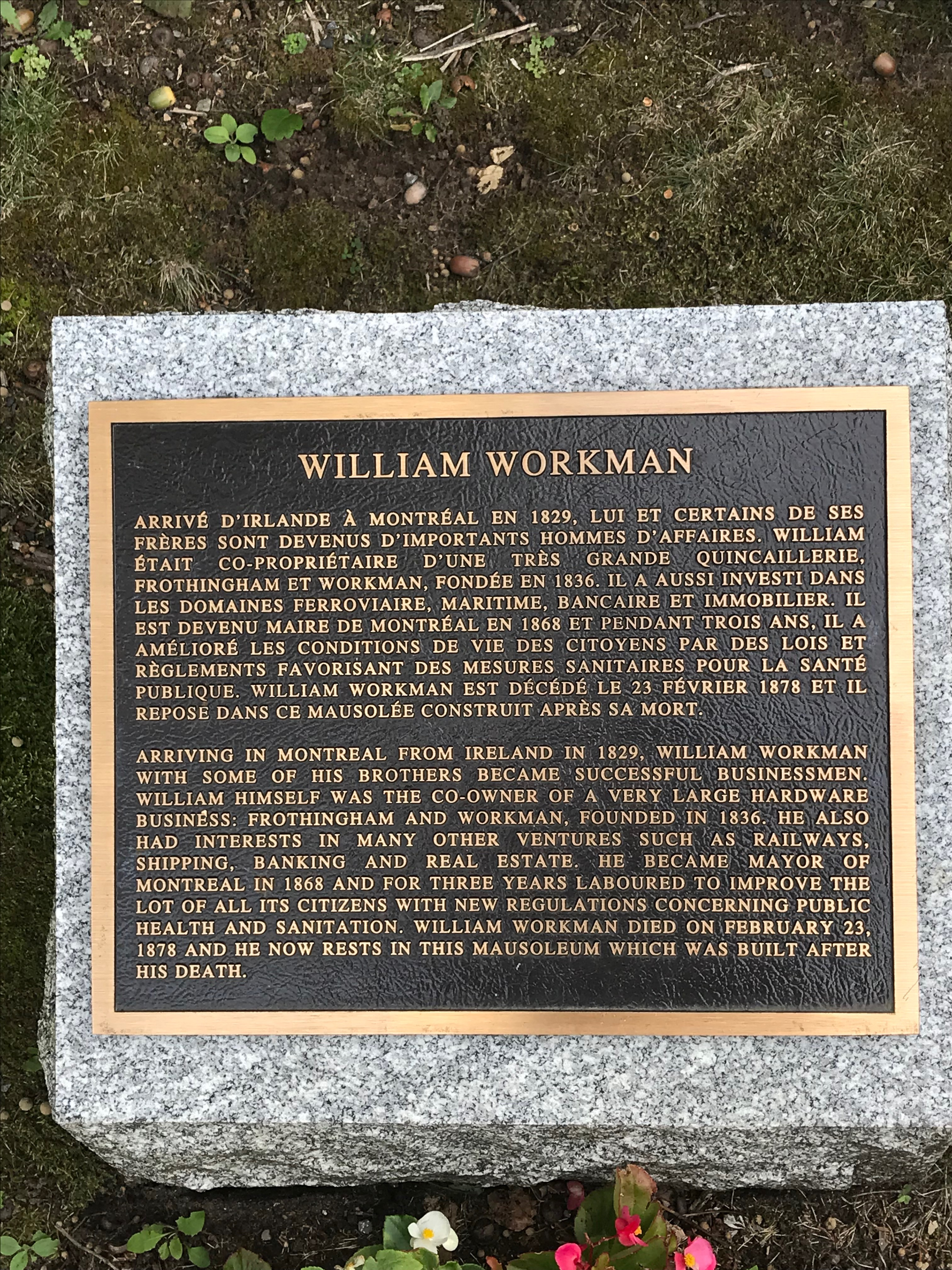

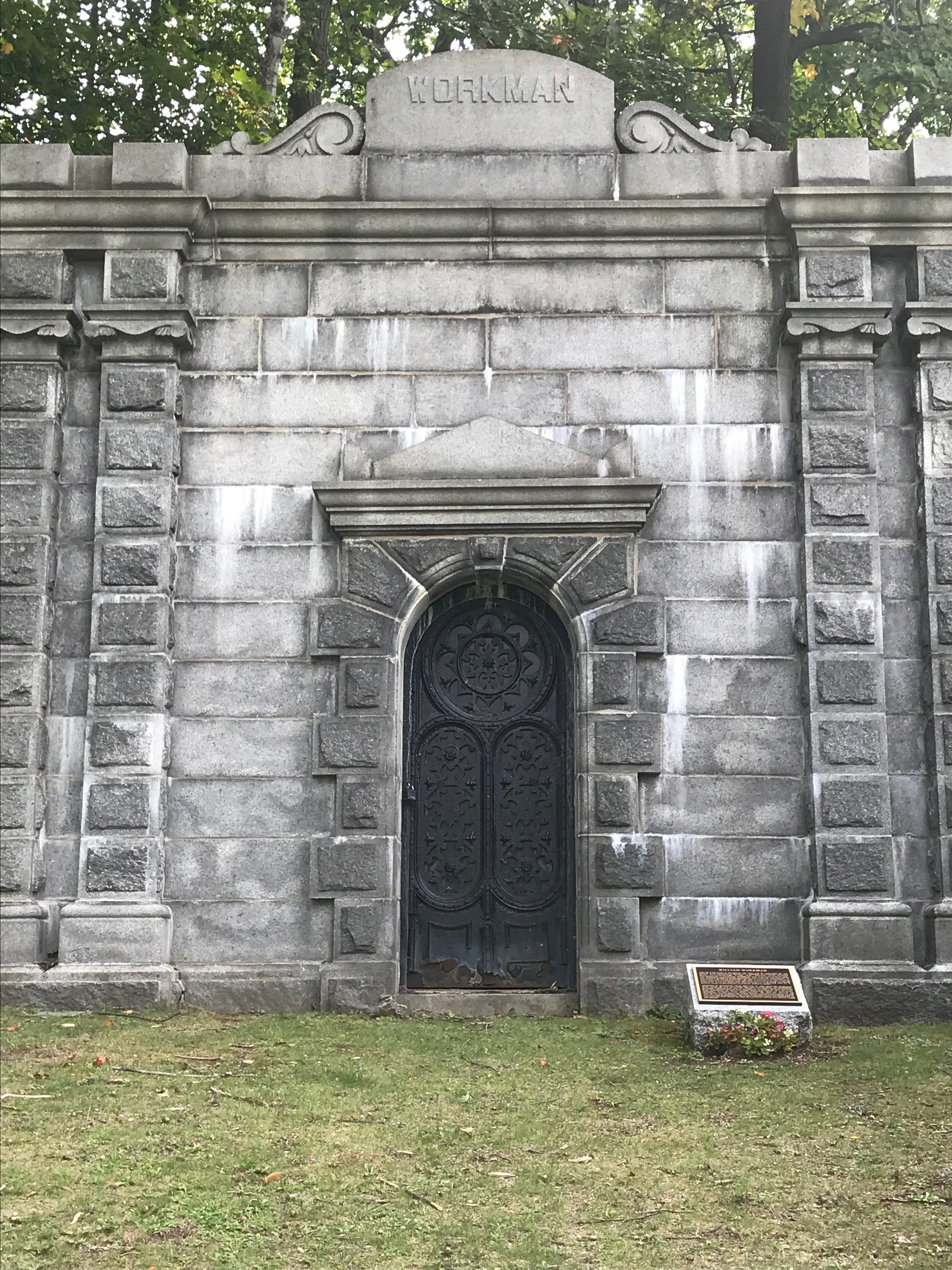
