= Rab Kilgour =

Scottish footballer

Personal information
- Date of birth: 20 October 1956 (age 70)
- Place of birth: Edinburgh, Scotland
- Position: Defender

Senior career*
Years	Team	Apps	(Gls)
1974–1977	Meadowbank Thistle	25	(0)
1977–1978	Whitehill Welfare		
1978–1979	Hibernian	5	(0)
1980–1985	St Johnstone	146	(3)
- * Club domestic league appearances and goals

Robert 'Rab' Kilgour (born 20 October 1956 in Edinburgh) is a Scottish former footballer, who played for Meadowbank Thistle, Whitehill Welfare, Hibernian and St Johnstone.
