= Thomas Molson =

Canadian entrepreneur and member of the Molson family

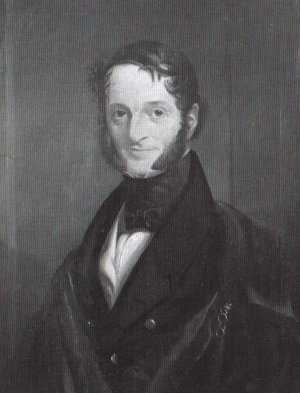
Thomas Molson

Thomas Molson (September 1, 1791 – February 22, 1863) was a Canadian entrepreneur and philanthropist, co-founder of Molson Distillery and member of the Molson family.

Born September 1, 1791, son of John Molson (1763–1836) and Sarah Insley Vaughan, at Montreal, Quebec. Thomas Molson was educated in private schools and apprenticed to the brewery trade. On becoming a partner in John Molson & Sons in 1816, he took over the management of the family's brewery operations. After an unprofitable venture into distilling in 1822, he withdrew from the partnership and settled in Kingston, Upper Canada, where he engaged in extensive brewing and distilling operations from 1824 to 1835. In 1836 he returned to Montreal to resume management of the family business. Under the firm-name of Thomas & William Molson it became one of the leading distilleries in North America. When William Molson retired in 1852 to establish Molson Bank, Thomas acquired sole ownership of the distilling interests and his son, John Henry Robinson Molson, became owner of the brewery. Thomas Molson was a benefactor of McGill University and the Montreal General Hospital. He also built a private church, St. Thomas, and a theological college.

In 1816 he wed Martha Molson (1795–1848), daughter of Thomas Molson (1768–1803) and Anne Atkinson (1765–1813). Thomas and Martha had at least eleven children before her death in 1848. In 1859 Thomas remarried to Sophia Stevenson, daughter of John Frederick Stevenson & Mary Catherine Coyne. Sophia died at Port Hope in 1909; they had no children.

== Children and Grandchildren of Thomas Molson ==
Among these children and grandchildren of Thomas Molson are several who became prominent in the family business or in the community; several married into other leading Montreal families.

Children

- Martha Molson (1824-1900)
- John Henry Robinson Molson (1826-1897)
- Mary Anne Molson (1826-1922)
- Harriet Molson (1830-1913)
- Markland Molson (? - ?) - son
- Frances Molson (1835-1841)
- John Thomas Molson (1837-1910)

Grandchildren; children of John Thomas Molson

- Lillias Savage Molson (1866 - 1919)
- Herbert Molson (1875 - 1938)
- Kenneth Molson (1877 - 1932)
- Mabel Molson (1879 - 1973)
- Percival Molson (1880-1917)
- Walter Molson (1883 - 1953)
