= John Henry Robinson Molson =

Canadian entrepreneur and philanthropist

- Born: June 5, 1826; Kingston, Ontario, Canada
- Died: May 28, 1897 (aged 70); Montreal
- Other names: Jackey and John H R Molson
- Occupation: Businessman
- Known for: Owner of Molson Brewery and president of Molson Bank
- Spouse: Louisa Goddard Frothingham Molson (m. 1873)

John Henry Robinson Molson (June 5, 1826 – May 28, 1897) was a Canadian entrepreneur and philanthropist. He was the owner of Molson Brewery and president of Molson Bank.

== Early life and education ==
Born June 5, 1826, to Thomas Molson (1791–1863) and Martha Molson (1795–1848) at Kingston, Upper Canada, "Jackey", as he was affectionately known, was educated in Montreal public schools.

== Career ==
Inheriting the Molson Brewery in 1847 under the terms of his grandfather's will, he became associated with its management. In 1852, he entered into partnership with his father to conduct their separately owned brewing and distilling enterprises. Operations were continued after 1863 by John H.R. Molson and other brothers. On the retirement of John Thomas Molson in 1866, distilling was abandoned but the brewery continued under John H.R. Molson and Adam Skaife.

In 1879, Molson was made a director of Molson Bank and was forthwith elected vice-president, and later president, 1889-97. Other interests included the Montreal Street Railway, the City and District Bank and the Scottish Life Assurance Co. He was a life governor of the Montreal General Hospital, a generous benefactor of McGill University and a founder of the Verdun Protestant Hospital for the Insane.

== Personal life ==
In 1873, John was wed to Louisa Goddard Frothingham (1827–1910), daughter of hardware entrepreneur, John Frothingham. John & Louisa had no children. John died in 1897, at Montreal from nephritis. In 1897, there were no crematoriums in Canada. John's body was sent to Boston for cremation. His ashes were later placed in the Molson family vault at Mount Royal Cemetery. In his will, John left $10,000 to Mount Royal Cemetery with his instructions: "For the erection and workings of a crematory furnace for the cremation of the dead."
