= The American Society of Crime Laboratory Directors =

Professional society for crime laboratory directors

- Abbreviation: ASCLD
- Formation: 1974; 52 years ago
- Founder: Briggs White, then director of the FBI Laboratory
- Founded at: Quantico, Virginia
- Type: Not-for-profit organization
- Legal status: Professional society
- Purpose: Bring together crime lab leaders
- Location: Garner, North Carolina, United States
- Region served: United States and worldwide
- Services: Annual conferences
- Members: 700 (2025)
- President: Dean Gialamas
- Funding: Members fees
- Website: www.ascld.org

The American Society of Crime Laboratory Directors (ASCLD, pronounced 'azz-clad') is an American nonprofit society for forensic science. Membership is multinational, and is open to crime lab directors, managers or supervisors. ASCLD holds an annual members' conference, in which management training is given and networking is encouraged.

== History ==
The origins of ASCLD lie in a meeting of crime laboratory directors organised in 1973 by Clarence Kelly and Briggs White, of the FBI. At this meeting, a steering committee was formed, which brought ASCLD into being in 1974. The first meeting was held in Quantico.

In the 1980s, ASCLD created subcommittee to develop standards for crime laboratories. This subcommittee was spun off as a separate organization, The American Society of Crime Laboratory Directors Laboratory Accreditation Board, or ASCLD/LAB. ASCLD/LAB merged with ANSI National Accreditation Board (ANAB) in 2016.
