= Percival Molson =

Canadian athlete

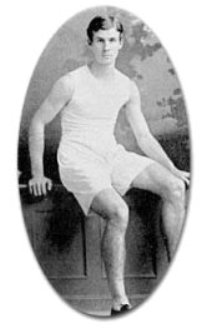
- Percival Molson

Profile
- Position: Running back

Personal information
- Born: August 14, 1880; Cacouna, Quebec
- Died: July 5, 1917 (aged 36); Avion, France

Career information
- College: McGill University

Career history
- 1902–1906: Montreal AAA Winged Wheelers
- Canadian Football Hall of Fame (Class of 1963)

Captain Percival Talbot "Percy" Molson, MC (August 14, 1880 – July 5, 1917) was a Canadian star athlete and soldier. After an outstanding sports career with McGill University, Molson joined its administration. Molson died fighting in World War I. In his will, he donated funds for McGill to build its football stadium, named Percival Molson Memorial Stadium in his honour.

== Biography ==
An Anglo-Quebecer, Molson was born in the resort community of Cacouna, Québec, on the St. Lawrence River. He was the son of John Thomas Molson (1837–1910) and Jane (Jennie) Baker Butler (1850–1926). A gifted athlete, at the age of sixteen Percival Molson participated in several sports and as an ice hockey player he was a member of the Montreal Victorias that won the 1897 Stanley Cup championship.

While studying at McGill University, Percival Molson captained the hockey team, starred in track and field competitions, played racquet sports, and made the football team. He was named McGill University's best "all-round athlete" three years in a row, a feat unmatched in the university's history. Throughout competitions in which he participated, he was acclaimed for his sense of fair play and achieved the remarkable distinction of never having been penalized for misconduct in any sport. In track and field he competed in several events including the Long Jump in which he set a world record at the American Athletics Meet in 1900. In 1903, he won the United States Outdoor Track and Field Long Jump championship. After Molson easily beat American Harry Hillman at the 1903 Canadian Championships in the 400 meter race, it was thought he had a chance in that event at the 1904 Summer Olympics in St. Louis, Missouri. However, he finished well back in the field.

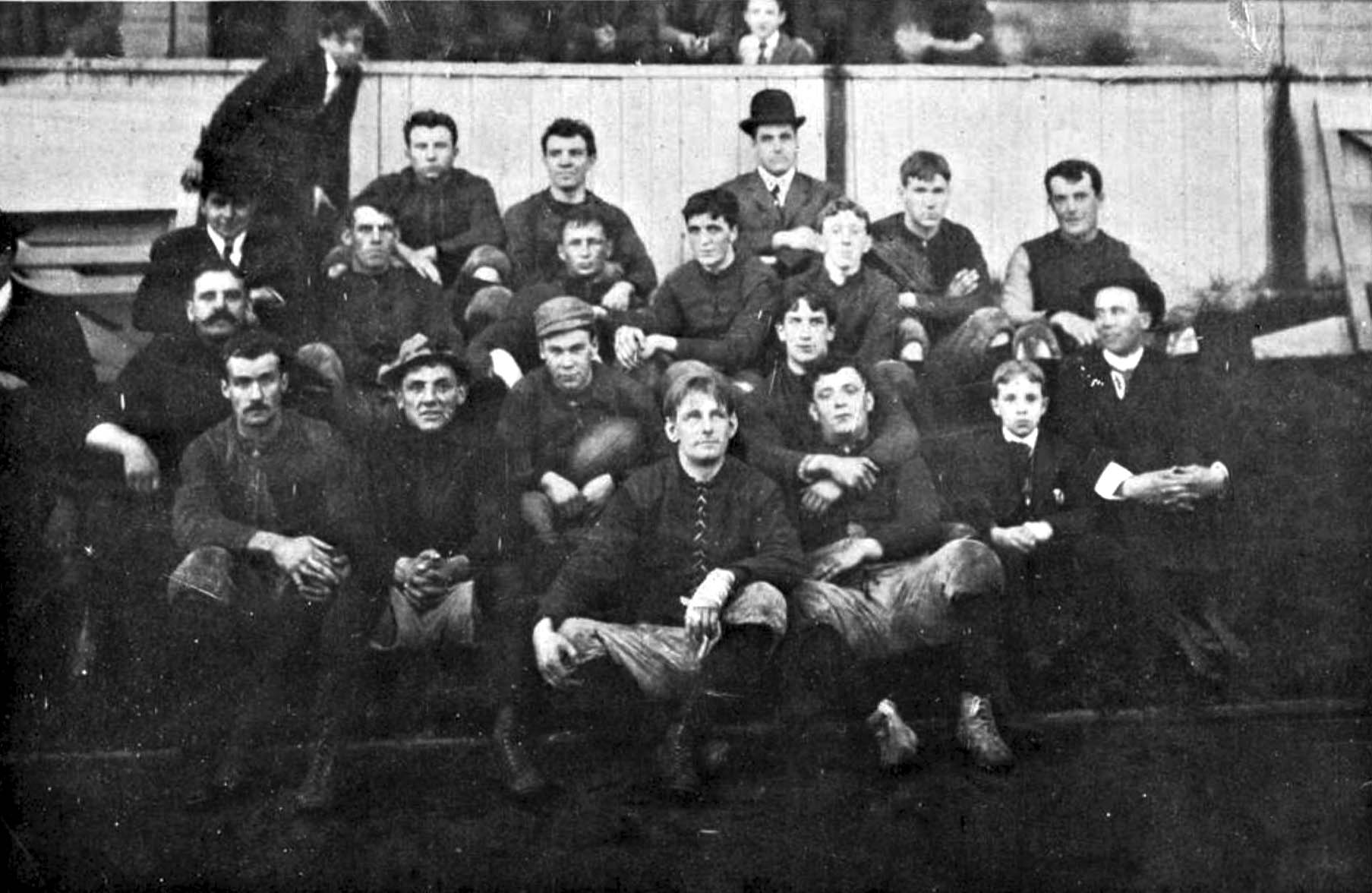
Molson, at far left in the front row, with the Montreal Football Club in 1905.

After graduation in 1901, Percival Molson was appointed to his University's Board of Governors, the youngest person ever named to that position. While a McGill University Board member he served as the chair of its Finance and Stadium committees. The university authorised construction of a new stadium to be built in Macdonald Park at the corner of University and Pine Avenues. However, with the onset of World War I, matters had to be delayed. Percival Molson along with George McDonald were instrumental in establishing the University Companies at McGill and other Canadian campuses to reinforce Princess Patricia's Canadian Light Infantry. Over a thousand men joined the Regiment through six University Companies. Many were subsequently commissioned from the ranks and went on to serve as officers in other Canadian and British units.

Captain Molson joined the Patricia's in the field with the 2nd University Company in October 1915. In June 1916, he was badly wounded in the Battle of Mount Sorrel at Sanctuary Wood near Hooge, West Flanders in Belgium. During horrific encounters with the German Army, where members of the 1st, 2nd and 3rd Canadian Divisions suffered 8,430 casualties, Percival Molson received the Military Cross for his valour. After recovering from his wounds, he returned to the front lines with his Regiment (PPCLI) and on July 5, 1917, at the outskirts of Avion, Pas-de-Calais near Vimy Ridge in France, Captain Percival Molson was killed by a direct hit from a German howitzer. Captain Molson is interred in the Villers Station Cemetery in Villers-au-Bois in Pas-de-Calais.

In Percival Molson's will he left $75,000 to McGill University to help pay most of the costs for the construction of the stadium. Although it was officially dedicated as McGill Graduates' Stadium at an intercollegiate track meet on October 22, 1915, the Board of Governors of the university renamed the facility Percival Molson Memorial Stadium on October 25, 1919, in honour of this fallen hero.

In 1996, Captain Percival Molson was an inaugural inductee to the McGill University Sports Hall of Fame.

== See also ==
- List of Olympians killed in World War I
