= Percival Molson Memorial Stadium =

Stadium situated on the campus of McGill University in Montreal

- Stade Percival-Molson (French)
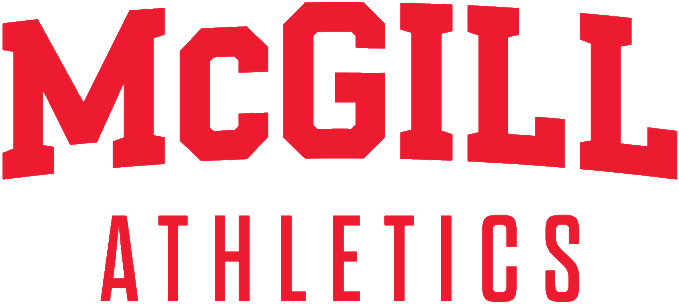

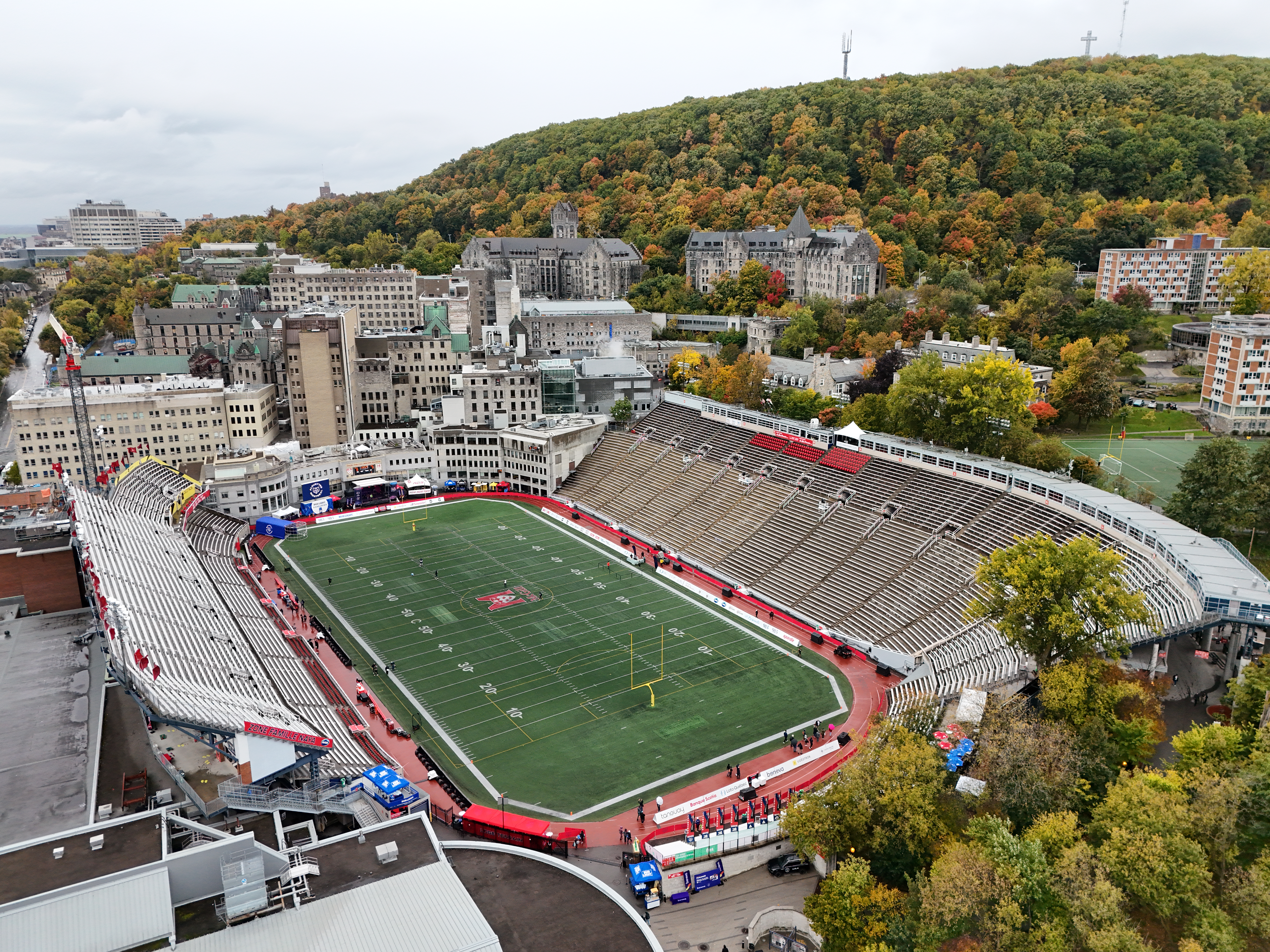
- The stadium in 2024

- Location in Montreal Location in Southern Quebec Location in Quebec Location in Canada
- Address: 475, avenue des Pins; Montreal, Quebec, Canada; H2W 1S4
- Coordinates: 45°30′36″N 73°34′50″W
- Owner: McGill University
- Capacity: 23,035
- Surface: FieldTurf (2004–present); Astroturf (1976–2003); Grass (1919–1975)
- Public transit: Montreal Metro: McGill; Place-Des-Arts

Construction
- Opened: 22 October 1915
- Cost: C$100,000 (approx.) ($1.68 million in 2025 dollars); Renovations: $29.4 million ($41.4 million in 2025 dollars); Total cost: $31.4 million in 2012 dollars
- Architect: Percy Erskine Nobbs

Tenants
- McGill Redbirds and McGill Martlets (U Sports) (1915–present); Montreal Alouettes (CFL) (1947–1967, 1972, 1998–present); Montreal Royal (AUDL) (2014–2015)

Website
- mcgillathletics.ca/stadium

Percival Molson Memorial Stadium (French: Stade Percival-Molson; commonly referred to as Molson Stadium, French: Stade Molson) is an outdoor football and multi-purpose stadium in Downtown Montreal, Quebec, Canada, on the slopes of Mount Royal, in the borough of Ville-Marie. Named in honour of Percival Molson, and owned by McGill University, it was the home of the Montreal Alouettes of the Canadian Football League from 1954 to 1967 and again since 1998. The stadium is also home to the McGill Redbirds and Martlets of the RSEQ, the Montreal Royal of the American Ultimate Disc League, the Selwyn House Gryphons high-school football team and the Canadian Corporate Soccer League, the largest amateur corporate league in Canada.

== History ==
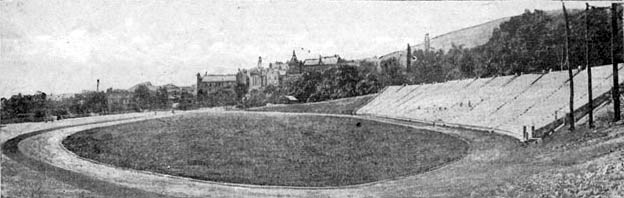
The stadium in 1915

Constructed in 1914 at the corner of University and Pine (avenue Des Pins), the stadium sat dormant through World War I with the cessation of football from 1914 to 1918. On July 5, 1917, Captain Percival Molson (1880–1917), great-grandson of brewer John Molson and a McGill University alumnus and sports star who had been instrumental in getting the stadium plan approved, was killed in action in France. His will left $75,000 to the university to help pay most of the total costs for the completion of the stadium. William C. Macdonald and John W. McConnell also donated money to help build and renovate the stadium. Designed by Percy Erskine Nobbs, the stadium was officially dedicated as "McGill Graduates' Stadium" at an intercollegiate track meet on October 22, 1915. It was renamed "Percival Molson Memorial Stadium" on October 25, 1919 by the university's Board of Governors, in his honour. As of 1970, Molson Stadium and Ivor Wynne Stadium were the only two Canadian Football League stadiums named for people known for amateur sport.

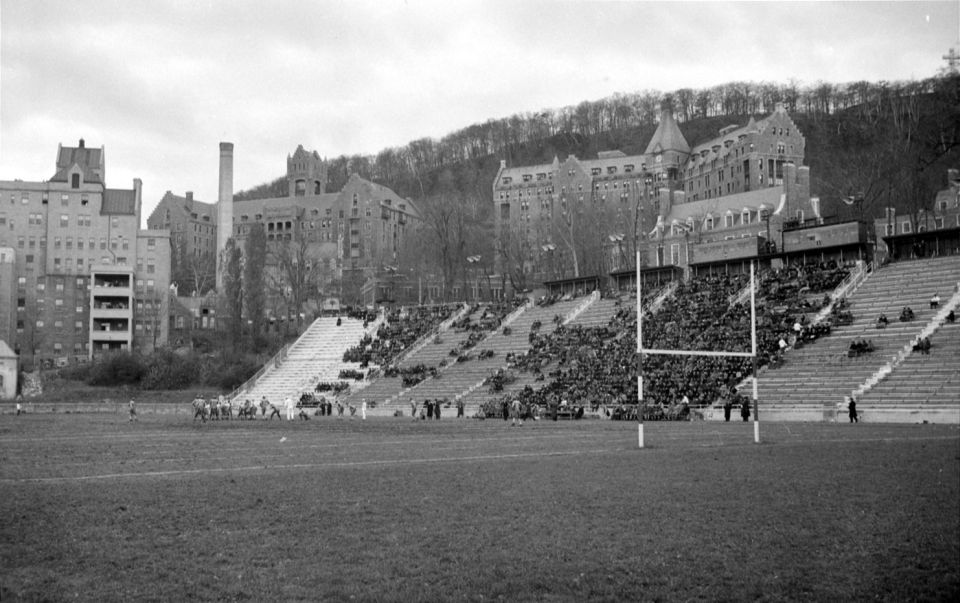
Montreal Indians vs Hamilton, 1937

The Montreal Alouettes played at the stadium from 1954 to 1967 before moving to the Autostade. An attempted return to the Molson Stadium in 1972 was not successful and the team went back to the Autostade the following season. When the revived Alouettes franchise was forced to move a 1997 playoff game out of Olympic Stadium due to a U2 concert scheduled for the day of the game, they played the game at Molson Stadium before a sellout crowd, prompting the Als to make it their primary home again the following season. However, all playoff games were played at Olympic Stadium until 2015.

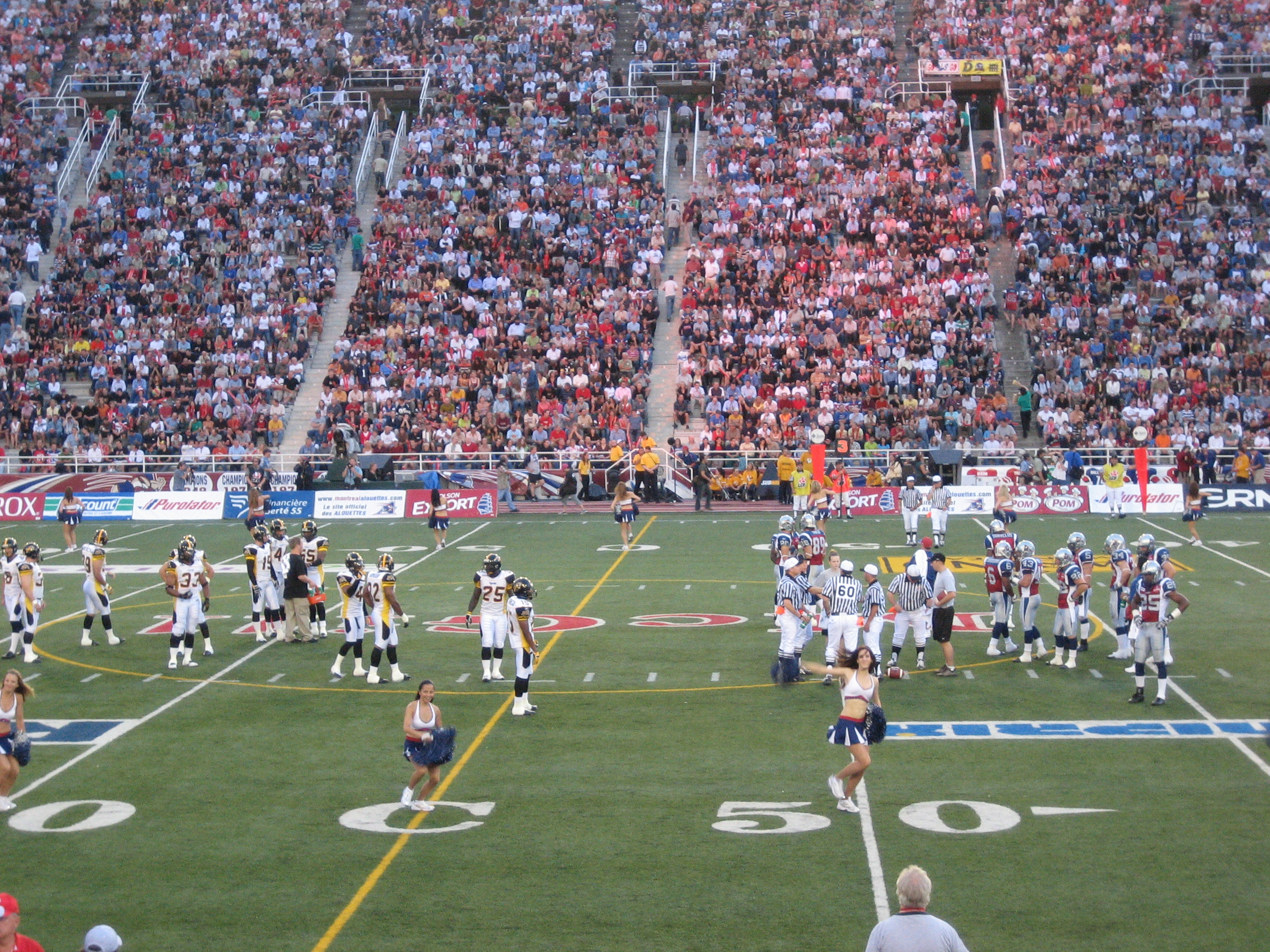
Montreal Alouettes cheerleaders entertain the crowd during a timeout in a game against the Hamilton Tiger-Cats on July 6, 2006, at Molson Stadium

The only Grey Cup game played at Molson Stadium was in 1931, which was the first time the Grey Cup was contested outside of Ontario. It also served as a venue for field hockey, during the 1976 Summer Olympics. It seated 20,202 and had been sold out for Alouettes games from August 12, 1999 until 2009. A renovation project begun in 2009 increased capacity from 20,202 to over 25,000 before seats were removed in 2014 to reduce capacity to 23,420. The seating capacity was lowered to 20,025 following a reconfiguration prior to the 2019 season.

The Alouettes' decision to return to the venue was problematic because the team was being sponsored by the Labatt Brewing Company and the stadium shared the name of its major competitor, Molson, though not named for it. Eventually, the team chose to change sponsors and have been sponsored by Budweiser since 2014. In 2004, The Alouettes installed a FieldTurf surface at Molson Stadium replacing the old-style Astroturf.

== Renovation ==
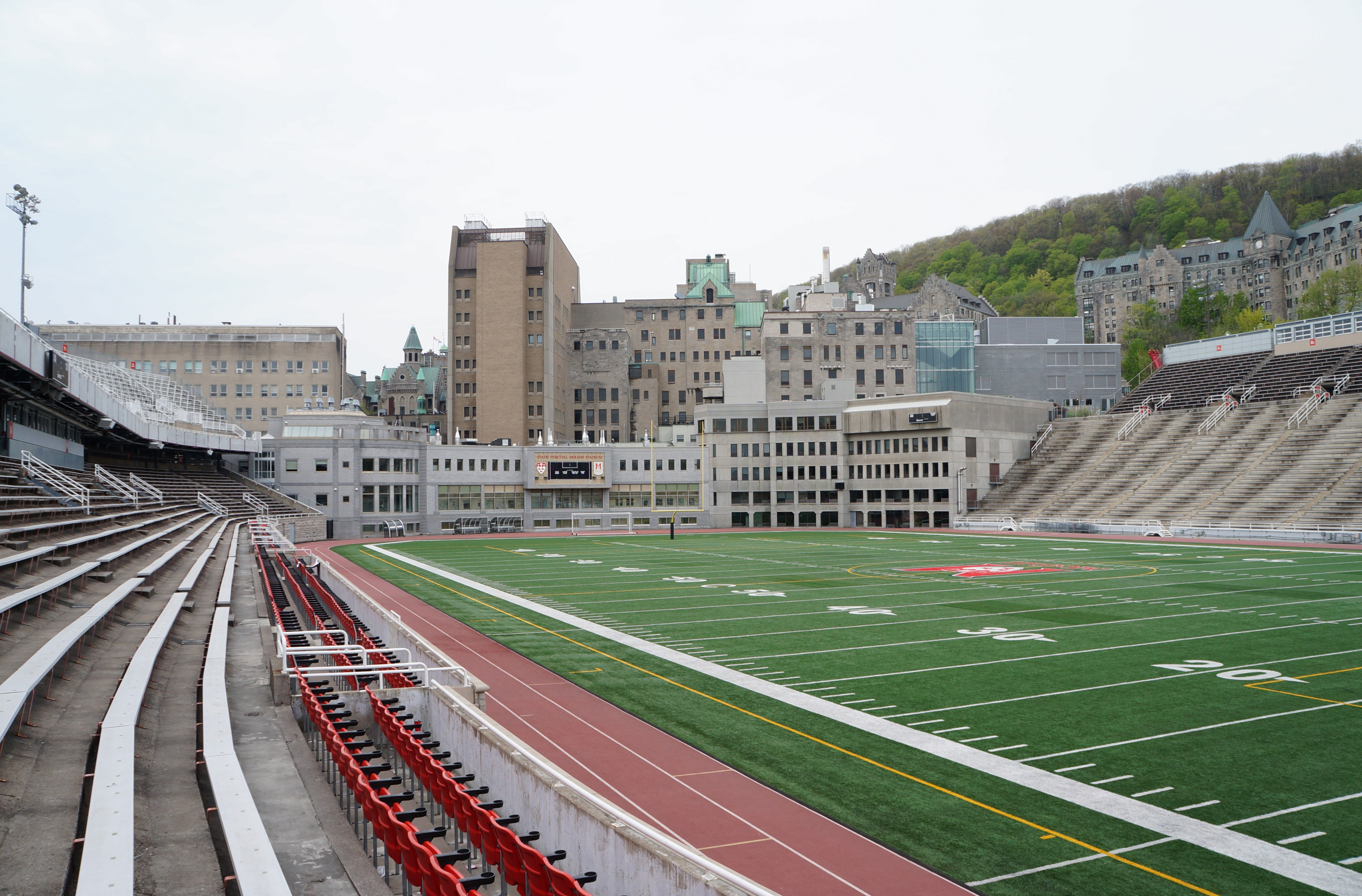
View of the stadium with the Montreal Neurological Institute around one end

Molson Stadium has been renovated and expanded, adding nearly 5,000 seats in time for the 2010 CFL season. The project to see the smallest CFL stadium increase to a seating capacity of 25,012 cost $29.4 million.

Eleven rows were removed from the south side of the stadium to construct a second tier and add the majority of the new seats, about 3,800. Also, temporary bleachers in the east end-zone were replaced with 1,500 permanent seats, a new section was added to the northeast corner, and 19 new private suites were constructed. The cost of the renovations were shared by the Quebec government ($19.3 million), the city of Montreal ($4 million), and Robert Wetenhall, the Alouettes' owner ($6,023,935).

== Layout ==
Because the playing surface is surrounded by a running track, the full 65-yard width and 20-yard length of the end zones is not available at the two end lines. However, the full width is available for more than half of each end zone, with the only missing pieces being the relatively small bits off the corners. Since the 2014 CFL season, it is the only stadium in the CFL to cut the corners on the end zones after Edmonton's Commonwealth Stadium was able to square off its end zones after removal of the running track. The full width of the end zones will become available for CFL games in 2027, when the league shortens its field length from a total of 150 yards to 130 yards (100-yard field with 15-yard end zones) while maintaining its 65-yard width.

== See also ==
- List of Canadian Football League stadiums
