= Harry Markland Molson =

Canadian politician (1856–1912)

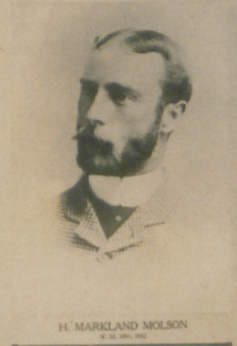
- Molson as Master of St Paul's Lodge 374 (Freemasons) in Montreal
- Born: August 9, 1856; Montreal, Canada East
- Disappeared: April 15, 1912; North Atlantic Ocean
- Died: April 15, 1912 (aged 55); Atlantic Ocean
- Resting place: North Atlantic Ocean
- Occupations: Politician and Entrepreneur

Harry Markland Molson (August 9, 1856 – April 15, 1912) was a Canadian politician and entrepreneur. A member of the Molson family, he was Mayor of Dorval, Quebec. He died in the sinking of RMS Titanic in April 1912.

Molson was born August 9, 1856, son of William Markland Molson (1833–1913) and Helen Augusta Converse (1834–1919), in Montreal, Canada East. Although Harry Molson was not a prominent member of the influential branch of the Molson family, he serendipitously inherited his fortune from his childless uncle, John Henry Robinson Molson (1826–1897), who was former owner of Molson Brewery and President of Molson Bank (1889–1897).

Harry Molson went to England for business in February 1912, and had booked passage to return to Canada at the end of March on the Allan Line ocean liner, SS Tunisian. Molson was persuaded by fellow businessman, Major Arthur Peuchen, to extend his stay in England and sail home with him on Titanic's maiden voyage. He occupied First Class stateroom C-30.

He was Governor of Montreal General Hospital, and on the board of directors for the Molson Bank.

Molson was last seen aboard Titanic, removing his shoes and planning to swim to a ship's light he said he saw off the port bow. His body was never recovered and identified.

== See also ==
- Passengers of the Titanic
