= Maggie Kilgour =

Canadian professor

Professor Maggie Kilgour FRSC
- Born: January 9, 1957 (age 69); Toronto, Ontario, Canada

Academic background
- Education: B.A., University of Toronto; PhD, Yale University
- Thesis: Ingestion as Metaphor and Literary Technique in Rabelais, Milton, Burton, Ruskin, and Northorp Frye (1986)

Academic work
- Discipline: Literature
- Sub-discipline: Renaissance European literature Gothic
- Institutions: McGill University

Margaret "Maggie" Kilgour FRSC (born 1957) is a Molson professor of English Language and Literature at McGill University. In 2015, she was elected a Fellow of the Royal Society of Canada.

== Education ==
Kilgour earned her Bachelor of Arts at the University of Toronto and her PhD at Yale University. She wrote her dissertation under the title "Ingestion as Metaphor and Literary Technique in Rabelais, Milton, Burton, Ruskin, and Northorp Frye," although it was later republished in 1990 by Princeton University Press as "From Communion to Cannibalism: An Anatomy of Metaphors of Incorporation."

== Career ==
Kilgour joined the faculty at McGill University as an English professor. She later served as the department's director of graduate studies. In 1999, Kilgour was promoted to chair of the Department of English. That year, she publicly advocated for the department to recruit new faculty members, noting how the department had shrunk to 27 professors. From 2006 to 2008, Kilgour also sat as a member of McGill's senate. In 2008, while on sabbatical to write a book regarding the Roman poet Ovid, Kilgour was awarded McGill's Principal's Prize for Excellence in Teaching.

In 2009, Kilgour was made Molson Chair in English Language & Literature.

In 2012, her book "Milton and the Metamorphosis of Ovid" was awarded the James Holly Hanford Award by The Milton Society of America. The book focused on how Renaissance writer John Milton interpreted the Roman poet Ovid's work and the influence it has on subsequent classical traditions. She was also accepted as an alternate chair on the University Tenure Committee for the Faculty of Arts until 2015.

In 2013, Kilgour collaborated with Elena Lombardi to compose a book of essays regarding Dantean scholars.

In response to a perceived lack of interest and budget cuts to the Faculty of Arts in 2014, Kilgour organized a four-part discussion series on the importance of a humanities education and a $500 essay competition to encourage students to enroll in the humanities. Since then, she has organized an annual round table discussion series called "McGill for Humanities" to help students understand the importance of a humanities education and find careers.

In 2015, she was elected a Fellow of the Royal Society of Canada. The following year, she earned a visiting fellowship to All Souls College, Oxford. While there, she studied the relationship between Milton and Shakespeare and began another book titled "Fine Excess: Milton's Poetical Thought".

She sits on the editorial board of the annual "Milton Studies Journal."

== Publications ==
The following is a list of publications:

- The Rise of the gothic novel (1995)
- Dantean Dialogues: Engaging with the Legacy of Amilcare Iannucci (2013)
- Milton and the metamorphosis of Ovid (2014)
- From communion to cannibalism (2016)
