= Nower =

Nower may refer to:

== People ==
- Edward Nower (1921–2006), Canadian player of Canadian football and CFL Grey Cup champion
- Joyce Nower, San Diego County Women's Hall of Fame Inductee at the Women's Museum of California

=== Fictional characters ===
- Senator Nower Jebel, a character from the 2016 film Rogue One

== Places ==
- Nower Wood, Surrey, England, UK
- The Nower, Milton Heath and The Nower, Mole Valley, Surrey, England, UK
- Nower Hill, Pinner, Harrow, London, England, UK

=== Facilities and structures ===
- Nower Lodge School, Coldharbour Lane, Dorking, Surrey, England, UK
- Nower Hill High School, Pinner, Harrow, London, England, UK
- Nower Road (County Route 62), see List of county routes in Madison County, New York

== Other uses ==
- The Nower Church, a congregation in Mole Valley, Surrey, England, UK; see List of places of worship in Mole Valley
