= Rafael Díaz Albertini =

Cuban violinist (1857–1928)

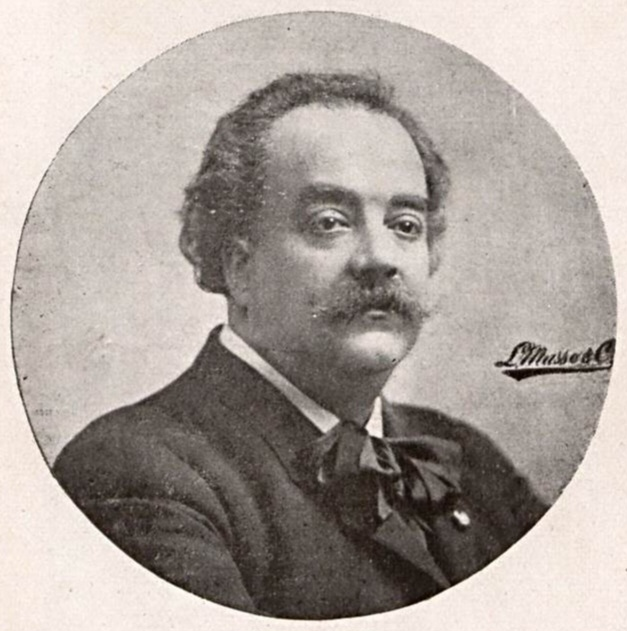
Portrait taken in 1907, when he was on a concert tour in Rio de Janeiro, Brazil

Rafael Díaz Albertini y Urioste (13 August 1857 – 11 November 1928) was a Cuban violinist. He received the French Legion of Honour.

== Biographic notes ==
Rafael Díaz Albertini y Urioste was born in Havana, Cuba, on 13 August 1857, to Agustin Díaz Albertini and María Josefa Urioste y Perez.

In July 1860, due to his delicate health, he was taken to New York, where his first violin was bought for him. When he was seven years old, he took his first lessons with the Cuban teacher Anselmo López. But due to his precarious health he had to go to Europe, where he was a disciple of the Belgian teacher Josef Vander Gutch. He returned to New York in 1866. There he received lessons from the eminent Poznanski. In the United States, he gave concerts in Saratoga, New York, and other towns, achieving great success. In 1869 he moved with his family to Spain and his presentation at the Santa Cecilia Philharmonic Academy and the Casino Gadità was a great success. From Cádiz he traveled to Paris in 1870, where Salustiano de Olozaga, then ambassador of Spain, had him give a concert at the Chinese embassy, in which the child prodigy reached immense technical heights. In the French capital, he was introduced to professor Alard of the Conservatory by his compatriot, the violinist José White. Then, wanting to expand his studies, he entered the Paris Conservatory in 1871, obtaining the first prize in 1872, the second prize in 1873 and the gold medal in 1875. From there he continued to be a notable concert performer.

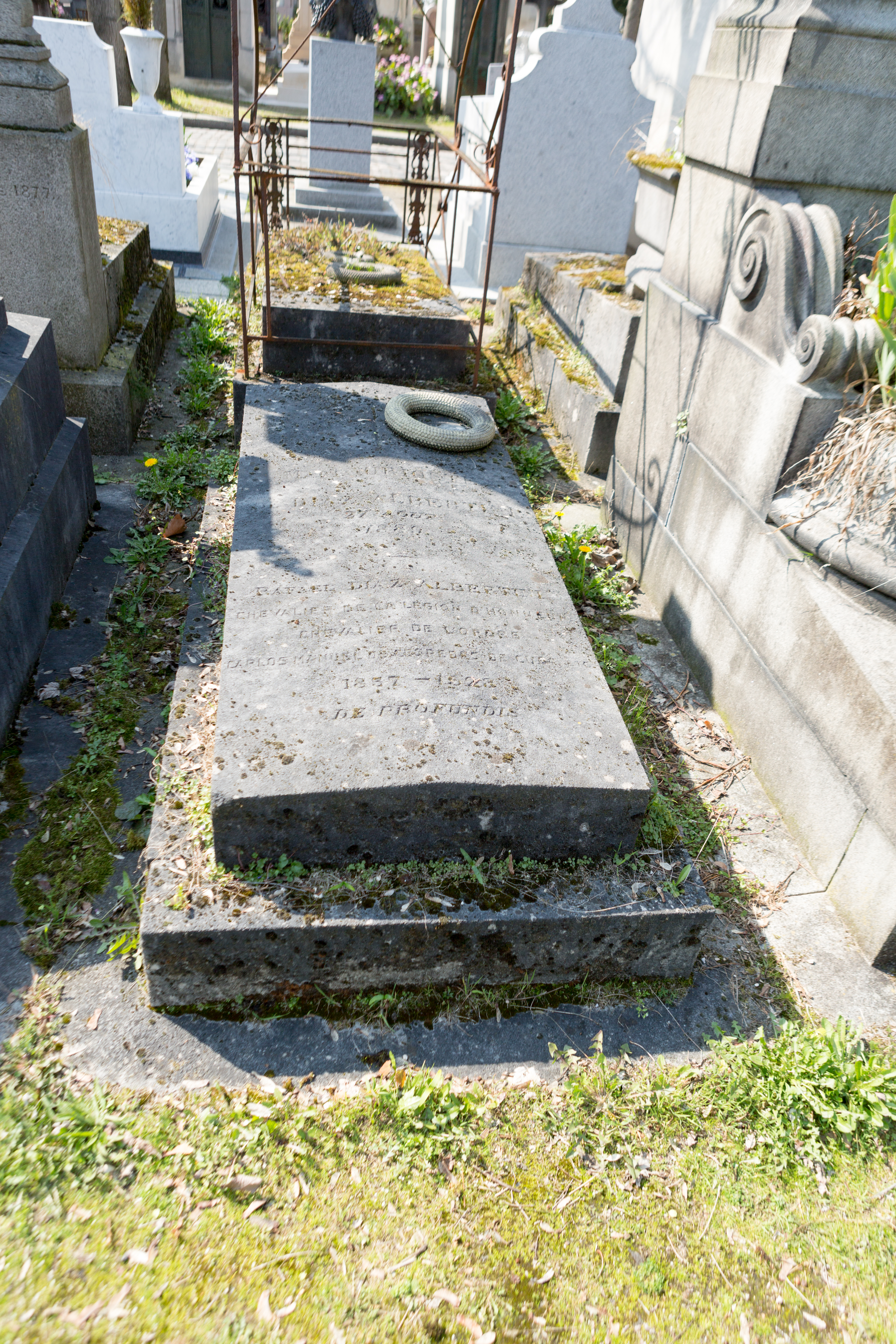
Albertini's grave in Père Lachaise Cemetery

In 1877, he gave several successful concerts in Spain. He returned to Cuba in 1878, after a nine-year absence.

In 1885, Pablo Sarasate dedicated his Ballade, Op.31 to Albertini.

In 1887, he went on a concert tour with Camille Saint-Saens, which provided Saint-Saens with the inspiration for his Havanaise.

In the early months of 1892, together with pianist and composer Ignacio Cervantes, he gave several concerts for tobacco workers in their workshops, in Key West and Tampa. José Martí recorded this extraordinary event in the newspaper Patria, in the articles "In the Workshops" and "Albertini and Cervantes," dated May 7 and 21 of that year, respectively. In 1894, he toured the island, again performing with Cervantes.

He died in Marseille, France, on 11 November 1928.
