= Andrew Gault =

Andrew Gault may refer to:

- Andrew Hamilton Gault (1882–1958), Canadian Army officer and British politician
- Andrew Frederick Gault (1833–1903), Ulster-born Canadian merchant, industrialist, and philanthropist
