= Kenneth Naylor (priest) =

Reuben Kenneth Naylor was an Anglican priest in Canada in the 20th century.

Naylor was educated at McGill University and the Montreal Diocesan Theological College. He was ordained deacon in 1912; and priest in 1913. He was at Rawdon until 1925 when he became a professor at his old theological college. He became the incumbent at Trinity, Montreal in 1940; and Archdeacon of Montreal in 1956. He retired in 1965.
