= Francis Alexander Caron Scrimger =

Canadian recipient of the Victoria Cross

Francis Alexander Caron Scrimger VC
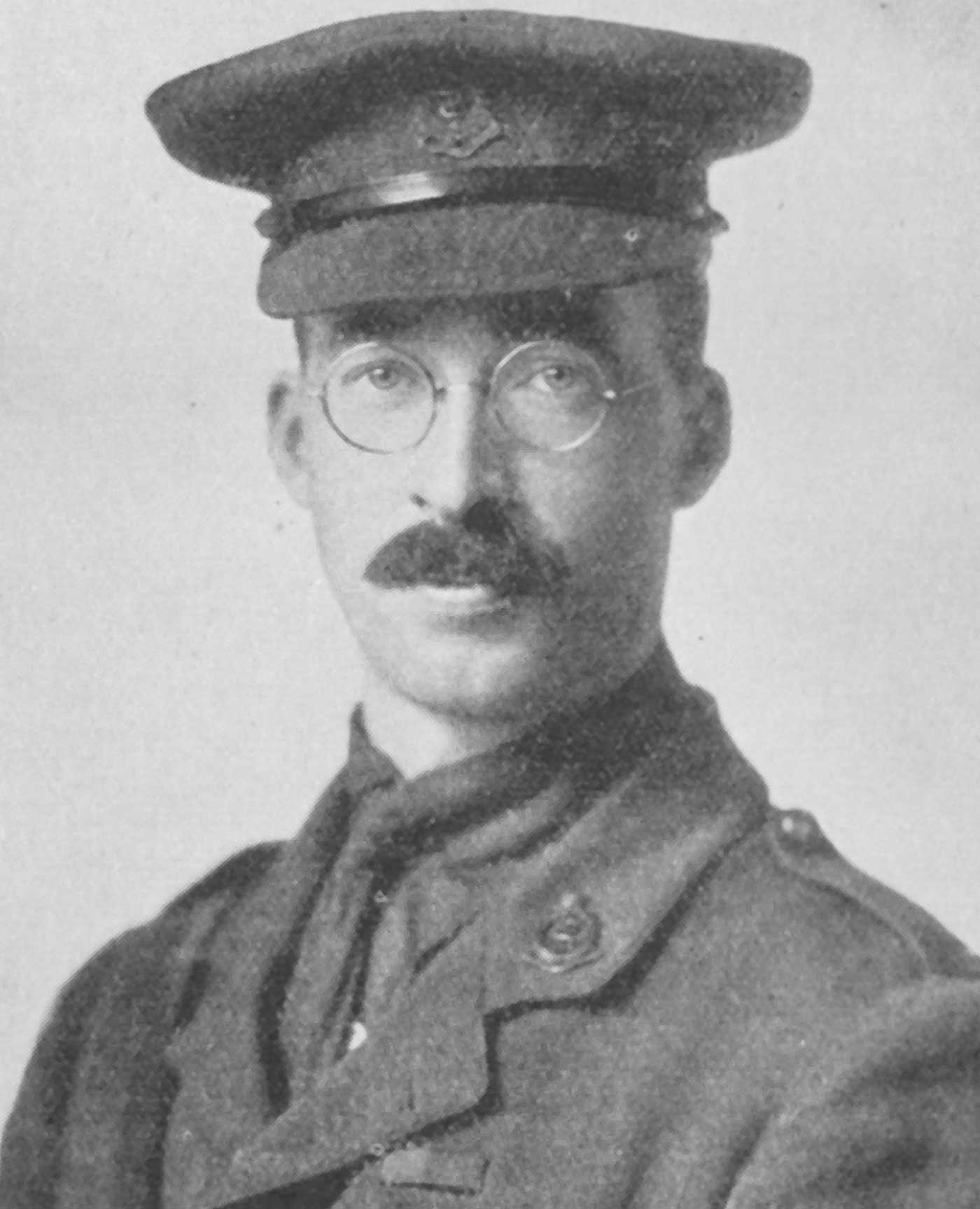
- Born: February 10, 1880; Montreal, Quebec
- Died: February 13, 1937 (aged 57); Montreal
- Burial place: Mount Royal Cemetery, Montreal
- Military career
- Allegiance: Canada
- Branch: Canadian Expeditionary Force
- Service years: 1912–1919
- Rank: Lieutenant-Colonel
- Units: Canadian Army Medical Corps (attached 14th Battalion, CEF)
- Conflicts: World War I - Second Battle of Ypres
- Awards: Victoria Cross

Francis Alexander Caron Scrimger, VC (February 10, 1880 – February 13, 1937), was a Canadian recipient of the Victoria Cross, the highest and most prestigious award for gallantry in the face of the enemy that can be awarded to British and other Commonwealth forces.

== Early life ==
Scrimger was born in Montreal, the son of John Scrimger, an ordained minister and principal of The Presbyterian College, Montreal. He was educated at the High School of Montreal and McGill University, obtaining a BA in 1901 and an MD in 1905. He was commissioned into the Canadian Army Medical Corps in 1912. His attestation paper for the Canadian Overseas Expeditionary Force states Scrimger was born 10 February 1881; however, the 1881 Census of Canada lists Frank Scrimger as one year old in that year, hence the birth year of 1880 is correct.

== Victoria Cross ==
During the Second Battle of Ypres on 25 April 1915 at Saint-Julien, Ypres Salient, Belgium, Captain Scrimger, then serving as the medical officer of the 14th Battalion, CEF, was in charge of an advanced dressing station in a farmhouse near Ypres on the Saint-Julien–Ypres Road. The advancing enemy were bombarding the area with an intense shelling. The German infantry were within sight. Scrimger directed the removal of the wounded under the heavy fire. Captain Scrimger and a badly wounded Captain Macdonald were the last men left at the station. Scrimger carried the wounded officer out of the farmhouse to the road. The bombardment of shell forced Scrimger to stop and place Macdonald on the road. Scrimger then protected him with his own body. During a lull in the gunfire Scrimger again carried Macdonald toward help. When he was unable to carry him any further, he remained with the wounded man until help could be obtained.

== Later life ==
After the war, Scrimger was appointed to the chair of Surgery at McGill and Chief Surgeon of the Royal Victoria Hospital. He died in Montreal in 1937. His only son, Captain Alexander Canon Scrimger, of the 29th Armoured Reconnaissance Regiment (The South Alberta Regiment), Canadian Armoured Corps, was killed in action in Holland in 1944.

== Legacy ==
In 1918, Mount Scrimger, a 2,755-metre (9,039 ft) peak in the Canadian Rockies on the border between Alberta and British Columbia, was named after him. His medals are held at the Canadian War Museum in Ottawa after being donated by his descendants in 2005.
