= Robert Overing =

Canadian Anglican priest

Robert Young Overing (1872-1933) was a Canadian Anglican priest, most notably Archdeacon of St Andrews in the Diocese of Montreal from 1928 until his death.

Overing was educated at the Montreal Diocesan Theological College and ordained in 1896. After a curacy at Valleyfield he held incumbencies at Buckingham, Stanbridge East and Montreal.
