= Robert Silverman =

Robert Silverman may refer to:

- Robert Silverman (pianist)
- Robert Silverman (cycling activist)
- Robert A. Silverman, Canadian actor
