= George Holt Henshaw =

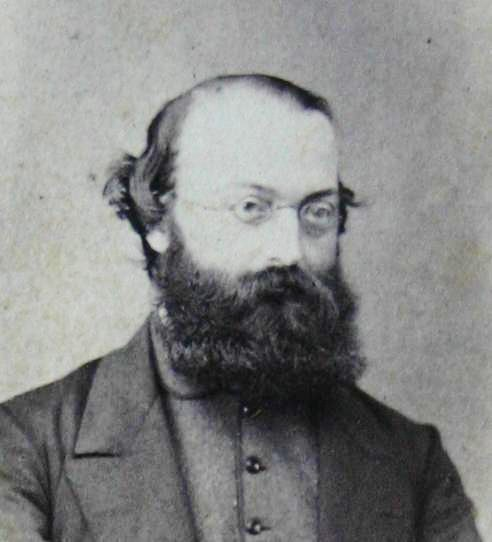
George Holt Henshaw portrait

George Holt Henshaw (September 1, 1831 – January 10, 1891) was a Canadian engineer and draftsman, who worked as engineer in waterworks and for railway companies in Canada, the United States and Denmark. He is particularly known for drafting the first organizational chart designed by Daniel McCallum.

== Biography ==
George Holt Henshaw was born in Montreal, September 1, 1831. At a very early age he demonstrated a strong desire to acquire knowledge of mathematics and drawing. As pupil of the Rector of the Montreal High School, the Reverend G. F. Simpson, who was a University of Cambridge mathematician, he attracted much attention, and while pursuing his studies at the school was advised by the Rector to engage the services of Andrews, professor of mathematics at Cambridge, who had recently come to Canada to settle. Under the tuition of Andrews he made such rapid progress that he was invited by Alfred Barrett, chief engineer of the Board of Works of Canada, to enter the Government service. His first work was on the improvements and enlargement of the locks of the Lachine Canal in 1847.

In 1849, Henshaw was offered the post of assistant engineer on the construction of the James River and Kanawha Canal, Virginia, and in charge of the divisional drawing offices. From 1852 to 1854 inclusive, he was engaged on the Chicago Water Works and various Railway Surveys in Illinois and Michigan. From 1854 to 1856 on the New York and Erie Railway, and from 1857 to 1859 was resident Engineer on the Trois Pistoles section of the Grand Trunk Railway.

Tn 1860, he was appointed by Tho. Brasse, as Engineer in charge of the Western Division of the Danish Railways. After seven years service in Denmark he returned to Montreal, and from 1869 to 1872 was resident engineer on sections 4 and 11 of the Intercolonial railway. During 1872-73 he was engineer in charge of survey between Three Rivers and Montreal on North Shore railway.

Henshaw's last service in Canada was as resident engineer of the Canadian Government at St. Anns, P. Q., from 1873 to 1838 when on the final completion of Canal and Locks at that place be removed to the United States and for the last two years has resided in Brooklyn and New York, being engaged in the development of a project for the protection of beach fronts of the Manhattan and Brighton Beaches from the action of the sea.

Henshaw died of heart failure, at his home at Brooklyn, New York January 10, 1891, age 59 years 8 months. He was elected a member of this Society of Civil Engineers of Canada on the 20th January, 1887.

== Work ==
=== First organization chart ===
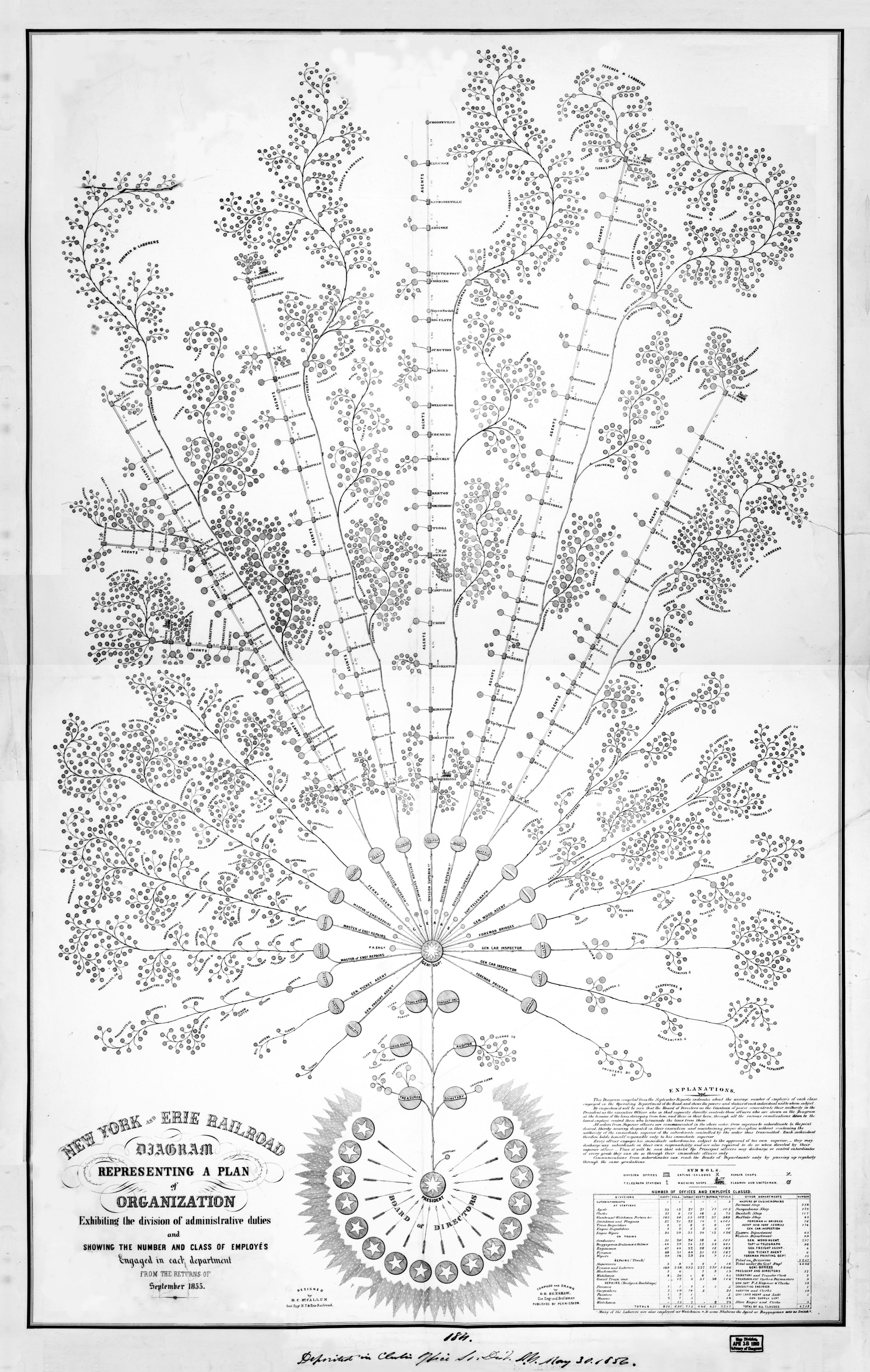
Organizational diagram of the New York and Erie Railroad, 1855

In his two years at the New York & Erie Railroad in 1854–55, Henshaw compiled and drew what has become known as the first modern organization chart. This chart was designed by Daniel McCallum, who was the general superintendent of the New York and Erie Railway at that time.

On the chart is written, that the diagram represents a plan of organization, and exhibits the division of administrative duties and shows the number and class of employee's engaged in each department, and is dated September 1855. The chart further explains that the diagram is compiled from the latest monthly report and indicates about the average number of employees of each class engaged in the Operating Department of the railroad company. It shows the powers and duties of each individual and to whom they are subject to report. It further describes:

By inspection it will be seen that the Board of Directors as the fountain of power, concentrates their authority in the President as the executive Officer, who in that capacity directly controls those officers who are shown on the Diagram at the termini of the lines diverging from him, and these in their turn, though all the various ramifications down to the lowest employee control those who terminate the lines from them.
All orders from the Superior officers are communicated in the above order, from superior to subordinate to the point of desired; thereby securing despatch in their execution and maintaining proper discipline without weakening the authority of the immediate superior of the subordinate controlled by the order thus transmitted. Each individual therefore holds himself responsible only to his immediate superior...

Furthermore, a table is added showing the number of offices and employee's classed. First were listed the employees in the five divisions of the New York & Erie Railroad divided in workers at the station, on trains, on repairs of trucks, and on repairs of bridges and buildings.

The chart has thought lost for years, and only located at the Library of Congress after many years of research after Alfred D. Chandler Jr. had suggested its existence. It was found by Charles D. Wrege and Guidon Sorbo Jr. They suggested that the visualization of the organizational tree probably was inspired by the shape of a local flower Salix caprea (goat willow, also known as the pussy willow, or great sallow).

=== Improvement of Channels in Sedimentary Rivers ===
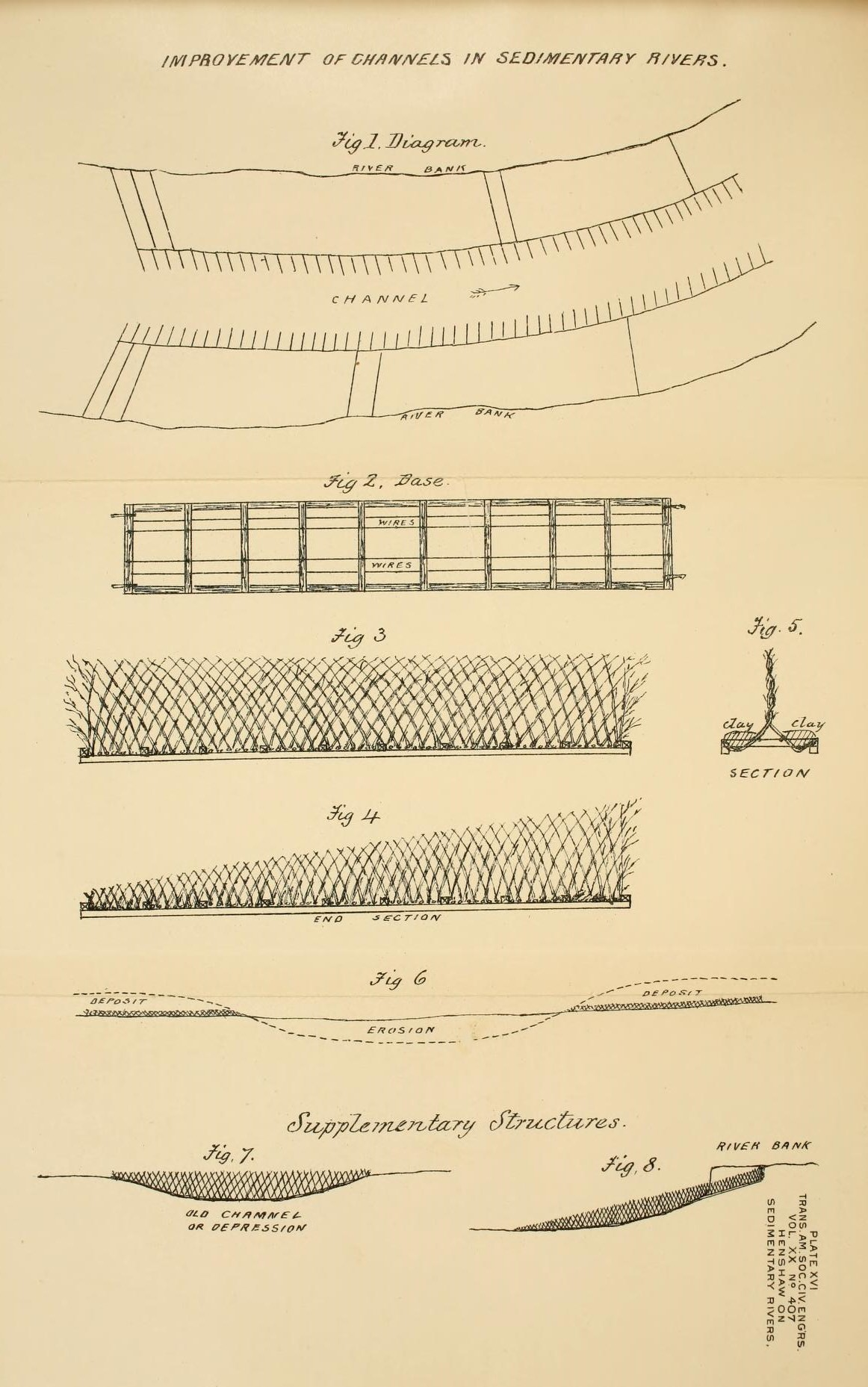
The Improvement of Channels in Sedimentary Rivers, 1889

In an 1889 presentation for the American Society of Civil Engineers, Henshaw laid down a theory on the improvement of channels in sedimentary rivers. Henshaw started with a general introduction about the importance of hydrological engineering works, naming Holland as modern example of a "whole country reclaimed from the sea". Waterways beside the railroad tracks elsewhere remain a prosperity of a country. Henshaw stipulates that to secure permanently navigable channel, it is not enough to protect banks or bluffs from erosion, because that "can have no effect beyond preventing a certain amount of sediment being added to that already encumbering the stream; the old varying conditions still exist over the spacious bottom, and in some way these must be altered." In order to do so there are two methods:

...the first method consists in the use of either solid dams or barriers permeable to water extending from the shore to the channel, for the double purpose of directing the latter into its desired course and accumulating sediment at its sides. The result looked for is a contraction of the river bed to the required limits, but [multiple] objections may be urged against this plan...
The second method... makes no attempt to accumulate sediment. Its object is to supply artificially to the bottom, on each side of the desired channel, that element of resistance to erosion which is essential to the ideal river; and it relies upon the action of the inevitable law just mentioned to scour out the channel and continue to do so, to a depth only limited by the slope of the river, or by encountering a stratum that cannot be naturally eroded. By this means it is expected that the ideal river will shape itself under a strictly natural process, for it will be seen that the artificial aid introduced acts solely in supplying a natural deficiency.

Henshaws paper further explains the methods and techniques to implement this second method: "Its object is to supply artificially to the bottom, on each side of the desired channel, that element of resistance to erosion which is essential to the ideal river; and it relies upon the action of the inevitable law just mentioned to scour out the channel and continue to do so, to a depth only limited by the slope of the river, or by encountering a stratum that cannot be naturally eroded."

== Publications ==
Books:

- George H. Henshaw, On the construction of common roads : to which is appended some remarks on the preservation of winter roads, 1871
- George H. Henshaw, A Plan for the Improvement of Navigation and the Prevention of Floods in the Mississippi, Montreal, Witness Printing House, 1882, pgs. 13–14.

Articles, a selection:

- George H. Henshaw, "Frazil ice : on its nature and the prevention of its action in causing floods" in Transactions, Canadian Society for Civil Engineering. (1887)
- George H. Henshaw, "The Improvement of Channels in Sedimentary Rivers", Transactions. New York: American Society of Civil Engineers March, 1889, pgs. 109–117.
- George H. Henshaw et al., "Discussion: Improvement of Sedimentary Rivers", Transactions, New York, American Society of Civil Engineers, May, 1889, p. 229-32.
- George H. Henshaw, "Acts of the River Commission viewed by a civil engineer." The New York Times, Jan 18, 1891.

== Patents ==
- U.S. Patent No. 419,121, "Means for controlling the shifting action of moving water on land."
