= Octavia Ritchie =

Canadian physician and suffragist (1868–1948)

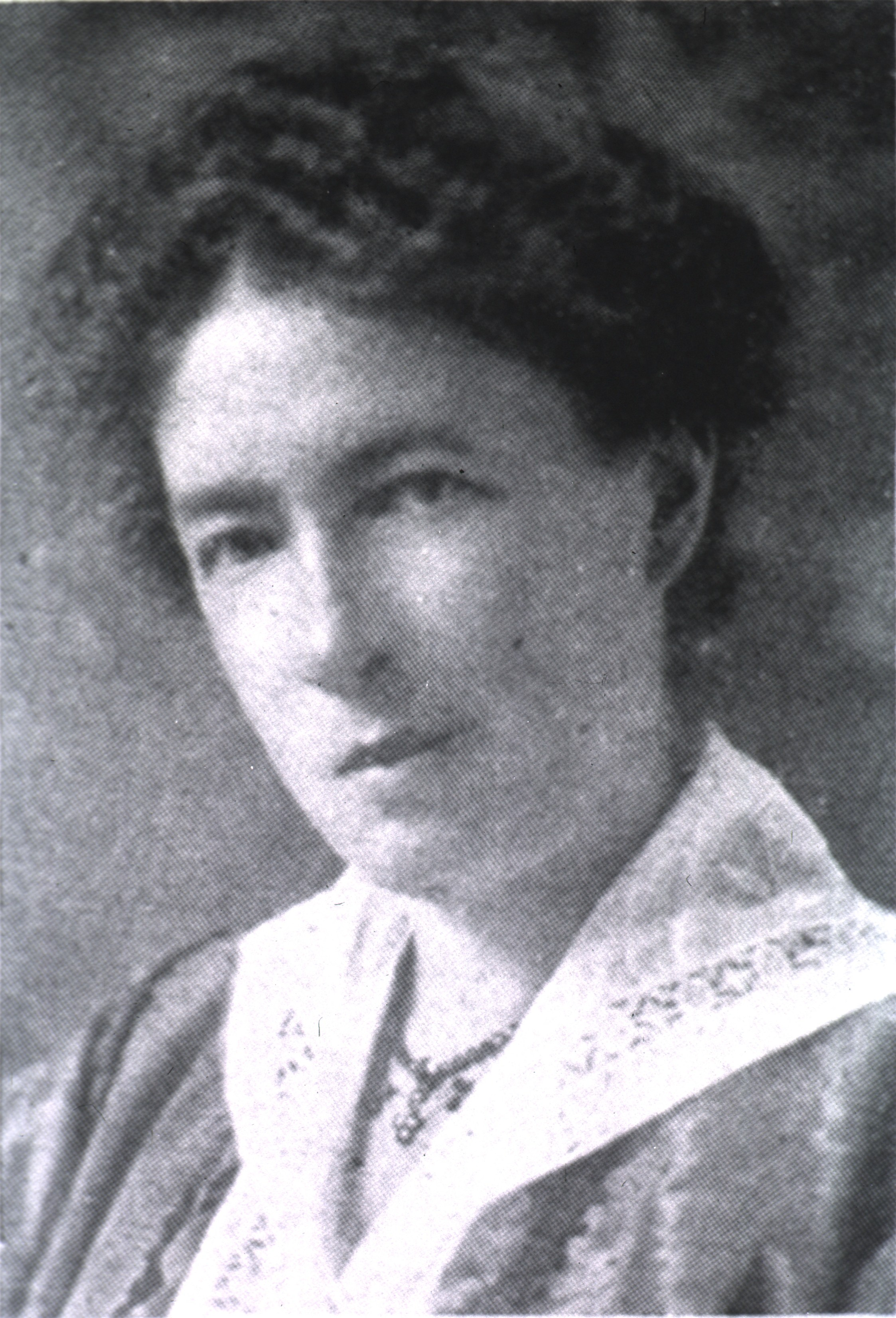
- Born: Octavia Grace Ritchie; January 16, 1868; Montreal, Canada
- Died: February 1, 1948 (aged 80)
- Education: Kingston Women's Medical College; Bishop's College
- Occupations: Physician, Suffragist
- Spouse: Frank Richardson England (m. 1897)

Octavia Grace Ritchie England (16 January 1868 – 1 February 1948) was a Canadian physician and suffragist. In 1891 she became the first woman to receive a medical degree in Québec.

== Early life and education ==
Octavia Grace Ritchie was born in Montreal, the daughter of Thomas Weston Ritchie and Jessie Torrance Fisher. Her father was a lawyer. She attended the Montreal High School for Girls. In 1888, she was the first woman valedictorian at McGill University. She wanted to continue into medical school at McGill, but was denied admission based on gender. Instead, she attended Kingston Women's Medical College, then transferred to Bishop's College, where she completed her studies in 1891, becoming the first woman to earn a medical degree in Québec.

As medical students at Bishop's, Octavia Grace Ritchie and Maude Abbott formed an organization, Association for the Professional Education of Women, to advocate for other women seeking medical or other advanced degrees.

== Career ==
Ritchie was appointed a Demonstrator in Anatomy at Bishop's College, and assistant gynecologist at Western Hospital. After she married, she turned more to advocacy work, supporting causes for women's rights and public health. She was president of the local Council of Women from 1911 to 1917; she was also president of the Montréal Women's Liberal Club, from 1921, and vice-president of the National Council of Women of Canada.

She represented Canada at the 1914 International Council of Women meeting in Rome; in 1922, she once again represented Canada, this time at the Pan-American Conference of Women in Baltimore. She was active with La Ligue des Droits de la Femme, which sought the vote for women in Québec provincial elections. In 1930, she ran for a seat in the Canadian Parliament as the Liberal candidate from Mount Royal. A collection of her original letters is conserved at the Osler Library of the History of Medicine at McGill University.

== Personal life ==
Octavia Grace Ritchie became the second wife of a fellow doctor, Frank Richardson England, in 1897. They had a daughter, Esther Ritchie England. Octavia Grace Ritchie England died in 1948, aged 80 years. In 1979, McGill Alumnae established an Octavia Grace Ritchie England Scholarship in her memory. The home on Bishop Street where the Englands lived, designed by architect Robert Findlay, is now a pub.
