= Joseph Marshall Stoddart =

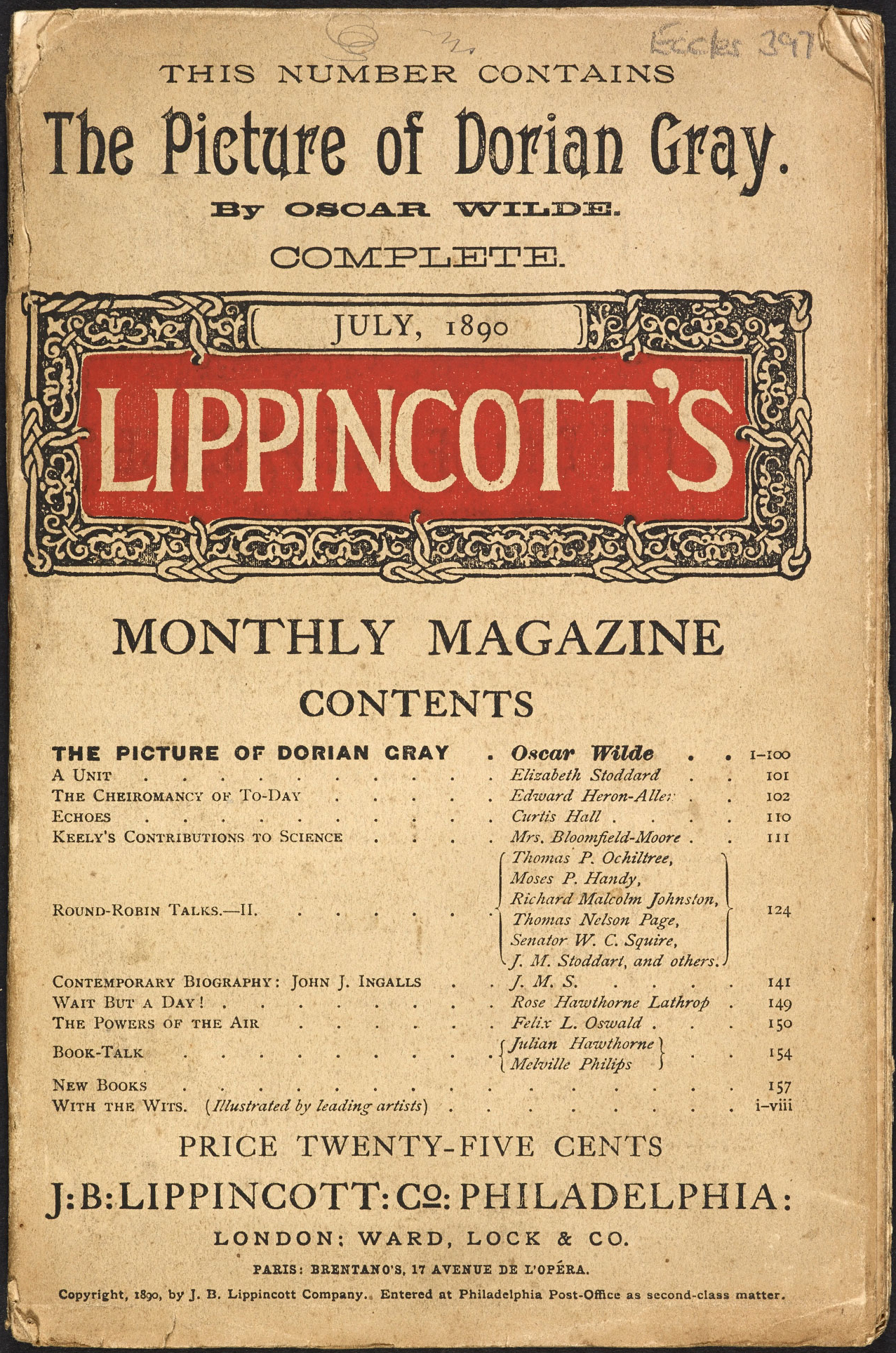
The issue of Lippincott's including The Picture of Dorian Gray

Joseph Marshall Stoddart (August 10, 1845 – February 25, 1921), was an American businessman, Editor of Lippincott's Monthly Magazine from 1886 to 1894 and later of the New Science Review.

The son of Joseph Marshall Stoddart Sr, and Elizabeth Fahnestock, Stoddart was born in 1845 in Philadelphia, Pennsylvania.

At an early stage of his career, he was a publisher, and after getting to know the Canadian weather forecaster Henry George Vennor Stoddart published Vennor's Almanac and Weather Record for 1882.

Stoddart was a friend of Walt Whitman, and after his arrival at Lippincott's William Sharp wrote for the magazine.

A memorial inscription at the Langham Hotel, London, commemorates a meeting there on August 30, 1889, between Stoddart, Oscar Wilde, and Arthur Conan Doyle, when Stoddart commissioned them to write stories for Lippincott's. Doyle wrote The Sign of Four, which Stoddart published in February 1890, while Wilde wrote The Picture of Dorian Gray, published in the magazine in July 1890.
