= High School of Montreal =

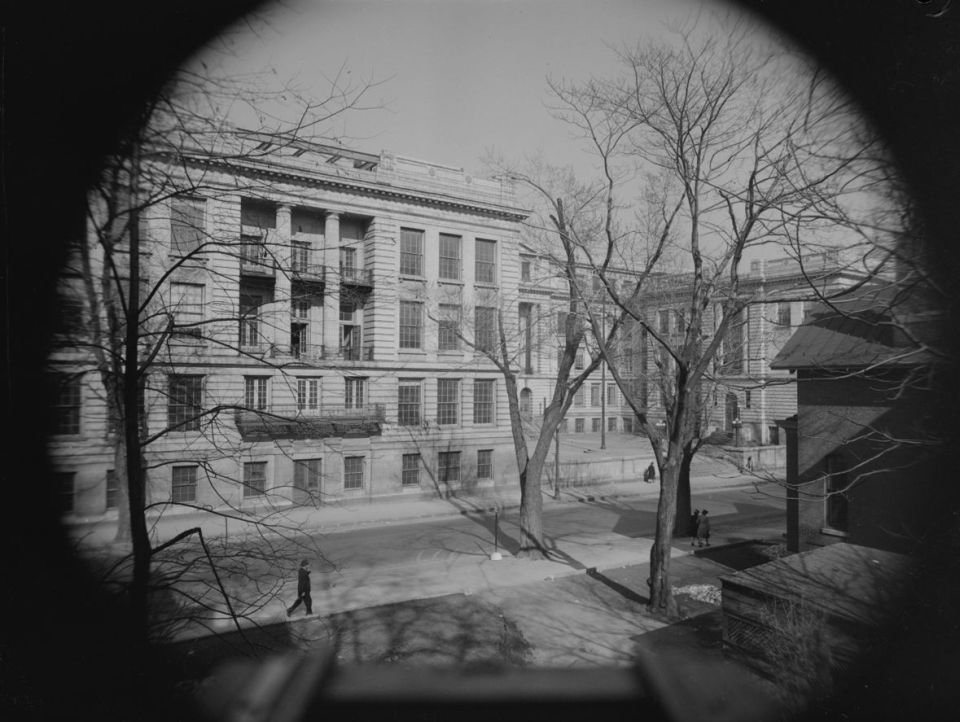

Location
- 3449 University Street; Montreal, Quebec; Canada; 45.50615°N 73.57484°W

Information
- Type: High school
- Motto: Latin: Corpori, Menti, Moribus (Body, mind, and behavior)
- Established: November 1843
- Closed: June 1979
- Gender: Boys and girls
- Age: 5 to 18
- Publication: The High School Magazine
- Former pupils: High School of Montreal alumni

The High School of Montreal was an English-language high school founded in 1843, serving Montreal, Quebec, Canada, in the area eventually known as the Golden Square Mile. It was less formally known as Montreal High School and from 1853 to 1870 was called the High School of McGill College, or the High School Division.

Founded as a school for boys only, girls were first admitted in 1875, although to a separate division called the High School for Girls, and a new building shared by both was opened in 1878. In its last century, the school took children from the first to the twelfth grades. In 1915, after occupying several different sites, the school moved into a new neoclassical building on University Street, near the campus of McGill University. Girls and boys were taught in separate wings of the building and were also apart for school sports, but came together for some activities. The two divisions were united into a single school in 1965.

The school closed in June 1979, largely as the result of a decline in the English-speaking population. Soon after, the mostly French-speaking F.A.C.E. School moved into its empty premises.

== Origins ==
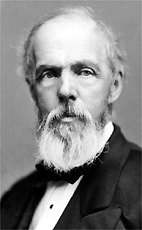
The leader of the school's founders, James Ferrier

The school was founded in 1843 by a group of Montreal professionals and merchants who saw the need for a Protestant secondary school which respected 19th-century ideas of education. It was modelled on the Royal High School, Edinburgh. Several of the founders, led by James Ferrier, with William Lunn, William Collis Meredith, David Torrance, and the Rev. Henry Esson, were of Presbyterian Scottish origins, and one of their purposes in establishing the school was to provide a solution to the growing influence of Anglicanism in education at the time. In short, they saw a need for a means of access to McGill College not controlled by supporters of the Church of England.

In August 1843, The Gentleman's Magazine reported, under 'Civil Preferments', "Rev. G. F. Simpson to be Rector of the Public College of Canada, about to be established at Montreal", suggesting that the name of the school still remained to be decided.

The school was first organized as a private institution, under a board of directors.

== History ==
The school's first Principal, the Rev. George Foster Simpson, M.A., was a young Englishman, a graduate and former scholar of Corpus Christi College, Cambridge, born in 1811. He opened the school in November 1843 at Bingham House, which had been leased by the directors of the school, and within a few months 167 boys had been enrolled. The end-of-year ceremony in the summer of 1844, presided over by Peter McGill, with Lord Metcalfe to present the prizes, was held in the large hall that had been the ballroom of Bingham House. The boys at the school in its early days included Thomas White, George Holt Henshaw, George Washington Stephens, Andrew Gault, later called the Cotton King of Canada, and Charles Hamilton, first Archbishop of Ottawa.

In 1846 the school moved into a new purpose-built building on La Gauchetière Street. The same year, on the death of the elderly Alexander Skakel, Master of the Royal Grammar School of Montreal, for many years the city's leading secondary school (founded in 1801 by the Royal Institution for the Advancement of Learning), the high school's board petitioned successfully for Skakel's salary to be transferred to it, and thus absorbed the Royal Grammar School; this was how the Principal of the new school came to be titled "Rector and Master of the Royal Grammar School" for over a century. Newton Bosworth, describing the school in a guide to Montreal of 1846, reported that it had accommodation for between three and four hundred pupils, that the Rector had several able assistants, and that the fees were £10 a year "in the higher branches" and £6 a year in "the preparatory branches". On 28 July 1847 a Provincial Statute was enacted which allocated the revenues from the Estates of the Late Order of Jesuits to educational institutions around Quebec, and the first item listed in the schedule was "For the Salary and Allowance for House Rent, heretofore paid to the Master of the Grammar School at Montreal, to be allowed to the Directors of the High School at Montreal, in consideration of their educating twenty free scholars of the poorer classes ... £282-4s-6d". Shortly afterwards the directors received £98-3s-6d as the balance of the grant for the year 1846, and also £141-2s-3d for the six months ended 30 June 1847.

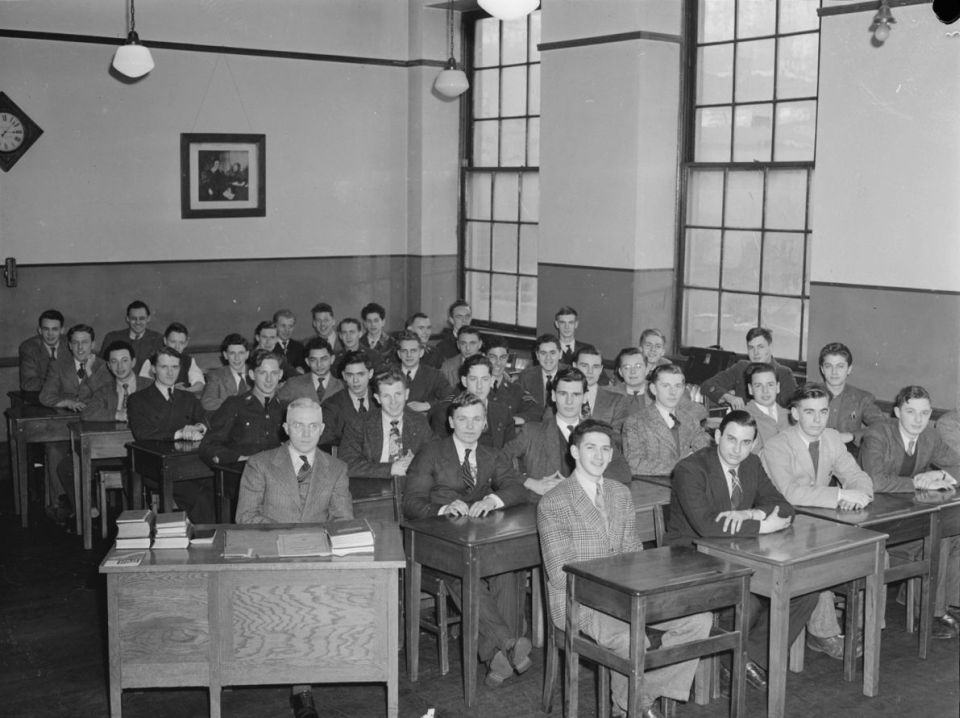
Grade 12 boys in class, 1945

In 1850, Foster resigned as Rector and returned to England, where he became headmaster of Lincoln Grammar School, but died suddenly in 1857. In 1853 control of the school was given to McGill College, and it was renamed as the High School of McGill College (governed by the Royal Institution for the Advancement of Learning). A McGill prospectus for 1863 states that "The High School Department offers a thorough English education, with the French and German languages, and the Classical and Mathematical training necessary for entering the College course."

In 1864, during the American Civil War, on hearing of the St Albans Raid from Montreal into the US by Confederate soldiers, the school organized a company called the Montreal High School Cadet Rifles. This continued to operate for some twenty years and was disappointed not to be mobilized at the time of the Fenian raids between 1866 and 1871.

In September 1870, control of the school was transferred again, this time to the Protestant Board of School Commissioners. Soon after that, J. W. Dawson, principal of McGill, began to press the Protestant Board to create a high school for girls, and in 1875 this came into being as a separate division, with its own "lady principal" and four other teachers, all trained at the McGill Normal School. This was made possible by a local school tax and was the spur for the planning of a new building, opened in 1878. To begin with, the girls' classes had been taught in private houses. The separate girls' school continued to exist in shared buildings until 1965, when for the first time the divisions for boys and girls were united under one principal. The boys' High School provided elementary as well as secondary education, with a junior division called the Preparatory High School. The girls' school did not at first include elementary classes, which came a few years later in the new building, and in 1878 the school population was 241 boys and 226 girls.

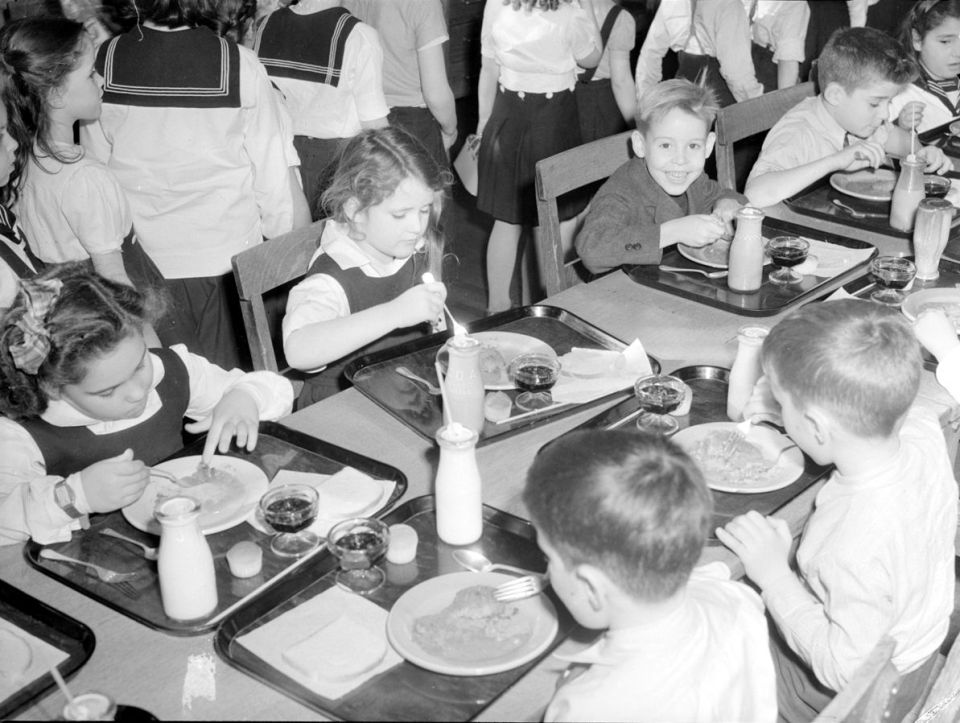
Juniors at lunch in 1943, pictured by Conrad Poirier

There was a bitter dispute in the 1880s when the Protestant School Board decided to stop the teaching of Latin in the first two forms and to limit Greek, Algebra, and Geometry to the final two forms. This was opposed by the elderly Rector, Dr Henry Aspinwall Howe, but supported by some parents and staff. On 28 November 1890 the dispute between those who believed in a classical education, including Latin and Greek, and those supporting a greater focus on sciences, culminated in the burning down of the school's building on Peel Street. No cause was ever identified for the fire. Dr Howe, a fierce opponent of a move away from classical languages, quickly tendered his resignation, to take effect from the end of the school year. The successful applicant to replace him, Elson I. Rexford, was English Secretary of the Department of Public Instruction. A new school building was built on the site of the lost one and opened in the fall of 1892.

The school has been described as "the secondary school for the city's Protestant elite", but as reported by Margaret W. Westley, "By 1906, the Protestant Board of School Commissioners was operating fifteen publicly financed elementary schools and three secondary schools, some of which were located conveniently close to residents of the Square Mile. Most renowned was the High School of Montreal. One of the comments made most frequently by graduates about the High School of Montreal is that there one met and knew people from all walks of life and all backgrounds, something not true of the private schools."

However, in 1906, the Rector and Master, Wellington Dixon, who had succeeded Rexford in 1903, reported "The High School is not free. It is supported by fees paid by the pupils, a Government grant of $2,000, and by grants from the rate. In return for the Government grant of $2,000, thirty free tuitions are ordered by the Lieutenant-Governor, not on the results of examinations, but on certain conditions of good conduct, etc... The High School (Protestant) does not confine itself to advanced pupils. As before said, the Elementary Schools are free, but the High School takes young children in the Kindergarten and Elementary Departments if the parents are willing to pay the fees. The High School, except in the case of the scholarships already mentioned, is a school for the children of parents who are willing to pay fees. Out of the 1,200 pupils in attendance, 550 are in the High School proper, and 650 in the Kindergarten and Elementary Departments, all of the latter paying fees.

In 1906, the school had three separate courses of instruction for pupils, the first two being Classical and Scientific, which ran in parallel, and the other Commercial. The aim of the Classical and Scientific course was to prepare children for higher education and the professions. Believing in the principle of mens sana in corpore sano, the school aimed to develop both body and mind, and at its site in University Street had its own swimming pool, two gymnasiums, a shooting gallery, and games rooms, as well as a library, auditorium, and planetarium.

During the First World War, 1,150 former pupils and staff of the High School went to fight in Europe, and 141 of them were killed. Their names are still recorded on a board in the foyer of the school building at 3449 University Street. One former schoolboy, Dr F. A. C. Scrimger, was awarded the Victoria Cross in 1915 for outstanding bravery under enemy fire.

Having shared buildings since the 1870s, the High School for Girls and the High School of Montreal at last became a single school in 1965. Nevertheless, in an autobiography Victor Malarek reports that in the mid-sixties the school remained segregated by sex.

In the late 1970s, with the school under the control of the Protestant School Board of Greater Montreal, the decision was taken to close it with effect from June 1979, largely the result of a decline in the English-speaking population in the area. Subsequently, the mostly French-speaking F.A.C.E. School (Fine Arts Core Education) moved into its empty premises. Like the former High School, FACE is both a primary and secondary school.

== Buildings ==
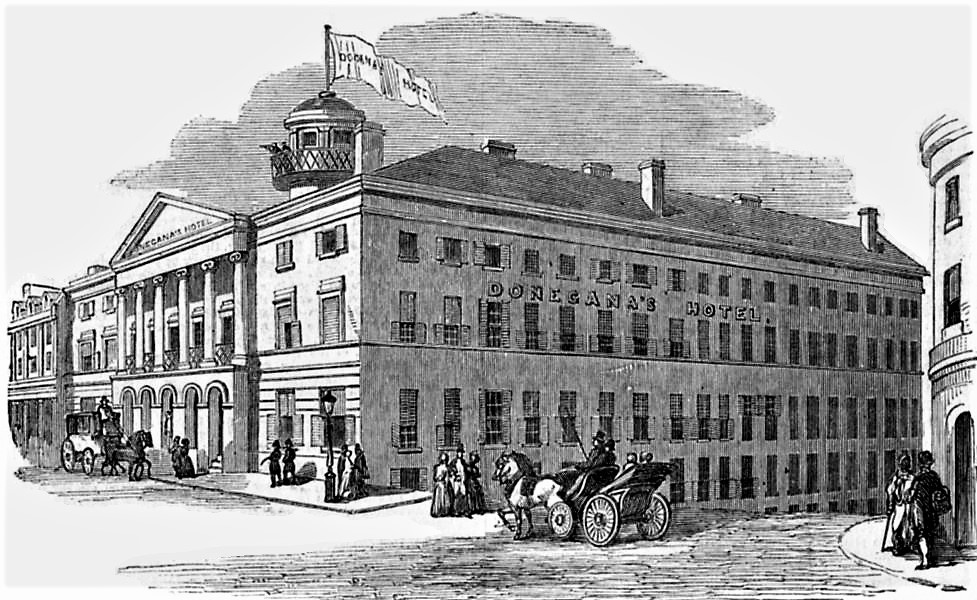
Bingham House, while being used as Donegana's Hotel after the high school's time there

The school's first home was Bingham House, a former vice-regal residence at the corner of Notre Dame and St Denis Streets. In 1845 a new school building was begun in La Gauchetière Street, with an entrance on Belmont Street, later to become the McGill Normal School, with its cornerstone being laid by Lord Metcalfe, the Governor General, and in 1846 the High School moved into it. The new school building, designed by John Ostell, was described as "in the Domestic approaching to Tudor style of architecture" and was sixty yards by nineteen, not counting a portico which projected thirteen feet, with a Lecture and Examination Hall nineteen yards square. Shortly afterwards, the Royal Grammar School joined the High School of Montreal there, following the death of its Master.

In 1854, the school moved again, to a new building called Burnside Hall (later known as the Fraser Library and Institute), which had been built to serve also as the arts building of McGill College. When the school was transferred to the Protestant School Commissioners in 1870, the building came with it. In 1878, to bring the boys' and girls' schools together under the same roof, a new building on Metcalfe Street was constructed, but Burnside Hall was not sold until 1883. The new Metcalfe Street building also fronted onto Peel Street.

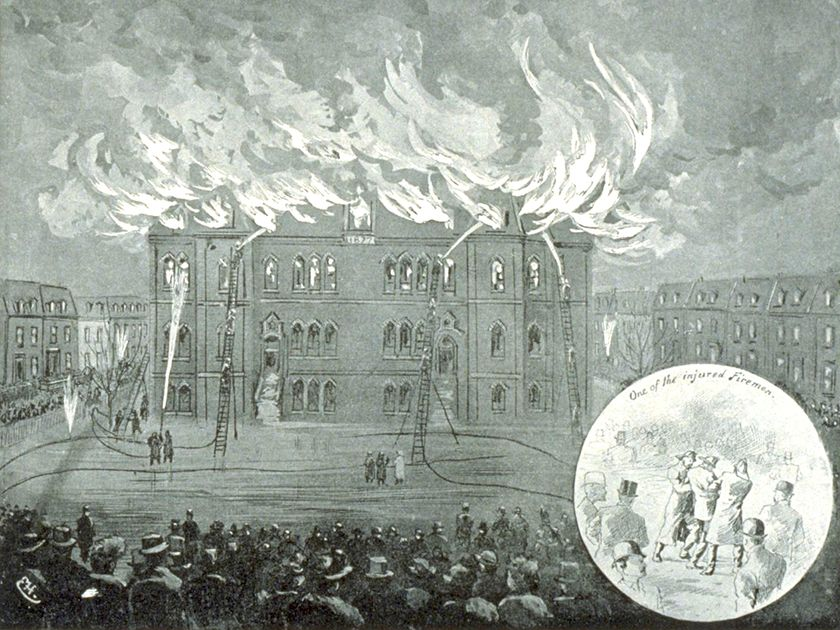
The school building in Peel Street on fire, 1890

In 1890, the school's building on Peel and Metcalfe Streets burned down, probably a case of arson, but the cause was never determined. A new school on the same site was opened in 1892. In the meantime, classes were divided between schools in Metcalfe Street and Berthelet Street and the Fraser Institute. The new building on Peel Street had thirty-two classrooms, those in the south wing for girls and in the north wing for boys. The corridors both led to an administrative heart at the centre, with gates topped by iron spikes to separate girls and boys. The site at 1455 Peel Street was later occupied by the Mount Royal Hotel, which in the 1980s was converted into the present-day Les Cours Mont-Royal.

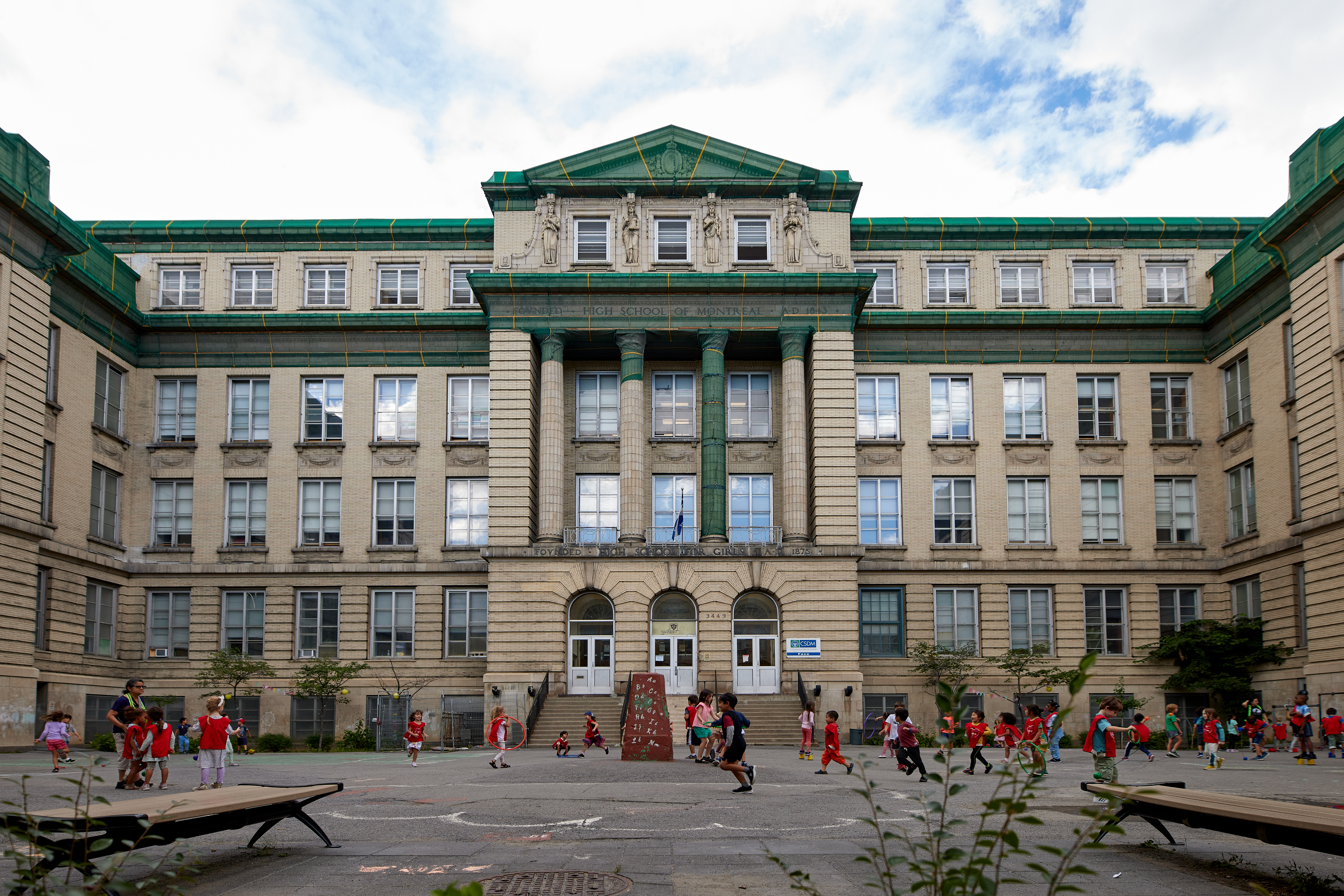
The University Street building, begun 1914

In 1911, with the school continuing to expand, a site for a new building was acquired, and in 1914 construction began of the school's final home, at 3449 University Street. The school was able to move in during September 1915. Built in a neoclassical Beaux-Arts architectural style, used for many public buildings at the time, but unusual for schools in Montreal, the new school was designed by William Sutherland Maxwell and his brother Edward Maxwell, leading Canadian architects who were also responsible for the nearby Montreal Museum of Fine Arts. Both were former pupils of the school. Finally completed in 1924, the building is shaped like the letter H and was originally planned to provide wings for boys and girls joined by a smaller central block, where shared activities were to take place. The many flourishes include four caryatids high above the main entrance and other decorative features, while the design of the staircases is believed to be unique, with separate double flights, one for up and one for down, which do not intersect. The auditorium was wood-panelled. The new building provided over sixty classrooms, on five floors, taking children all the way from first to twelfth grade.

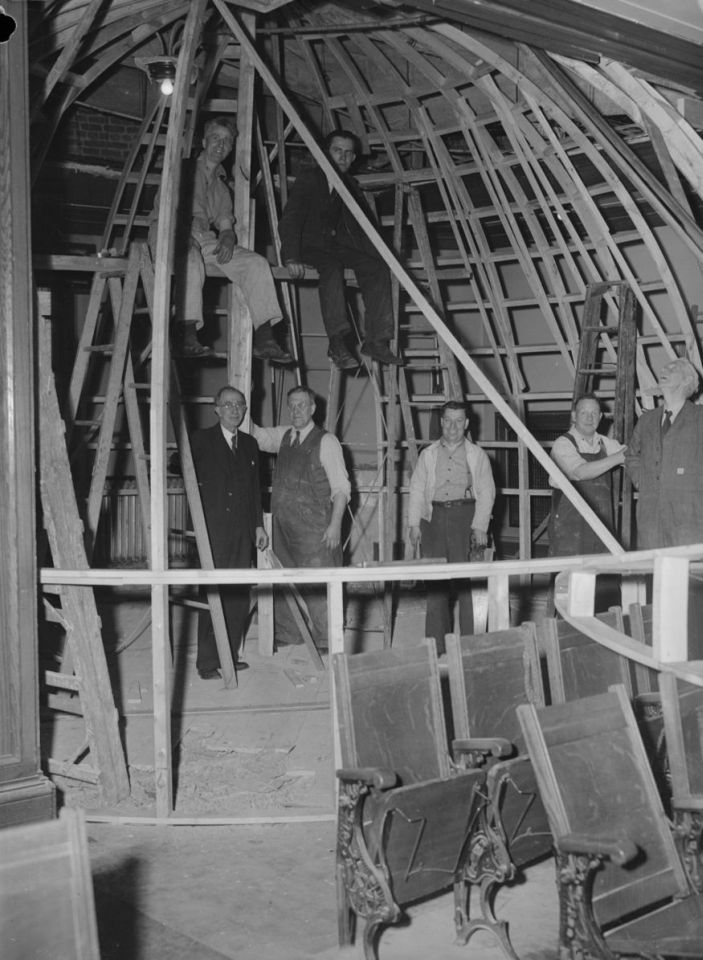
Construction of the planetarium in 1945

The school was the first in Montreal to have its own swimming pool, completed in 1924 in the basement of the new University Street building. There was also a shooting gallery, where sixteen people could shoot at targets 25 yards away, but at first it was used only by the boys, as was a room for sloyd. The library was common ground, but the physics and chemistry laboratories were in the boys' wing. Art was taught in separate rooms, and although the swimming pool was shared, girls and boys used it at different times. At first there was only one gymnasium, for boys, but soon the school's auditorium was converted into a girls' gym and a new auditorium was added behind the H-block. There were two sports rooms in the basement and two large recreational areas on the school's flat roof, each with views of the city and nearer views of each other.

== Rectors ==
The full title of the school's principal from 1846 until the mid-20th century was "Rector and Master of the Royal Grammar School". In practice, the title of "Rector" was usually used. By the 1960s, the word "Principal" was in use.

- 1843 to 1848: Rev. George Foster Simpson, MA (Cantab.)
- 1848 to 1890: Dr Henry Aspinwall Howe MA LLD
- 1890 to 1903: Rev. Dr Elson I. Rexford DCL LLD
- 1903 to 1922: Wellington Dixon BA
- 1922 to 1929: Dr Isaac Gammell LLD
- 1929 to 1935: Rev. Canon James E. Fee MA
- 1935 to 1945: Thomas Sommerville MA
- 1945: Leonard Unsworth BSc
- 1956 to 1974: Henry E. Wright

== Principals of the High School for Girls ==
- 1875–1880: Louisa Scott (Mrs. John Scott)
- 1880–1894: Mrs. H. C. Fuller
- 1894–1896: Miss Maria E. Findlay
- 1896–1903: Rev. Elson I. Rexford
- 1903–1911: Miss Georgina Hunter, B.A.
- 1911–1930: Miss Lillian Hendrie
- 1939: Miss Catherine I. Mackenzie
- 1946: Miss J. Grace Gardner B.A.
- 1952: Miss E. C. Rorke B.A.
- 1962: Miss Carrie L. Brodie (becoming Vice-Principal of the united school in 1965)

== Notable staff ==
- William Raphael (1833–1914) taught art at the school
- Guillaume Couture (1851–1915) taught music at the High School for Girls from 1885 to 1914

== Notable pupils ==
In chronological order.

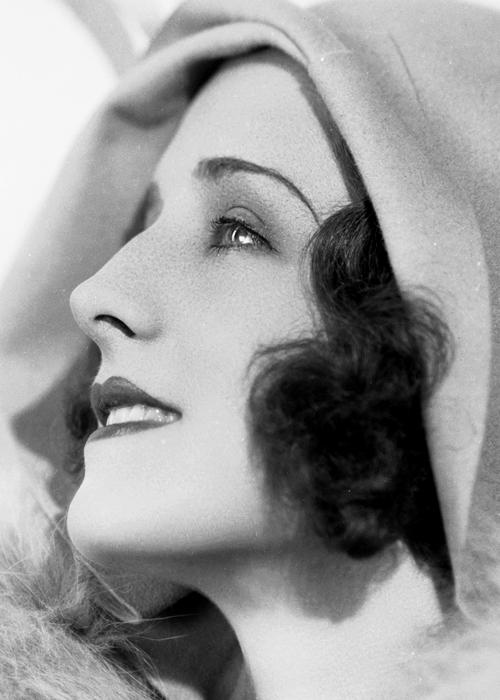
Norma Shearer

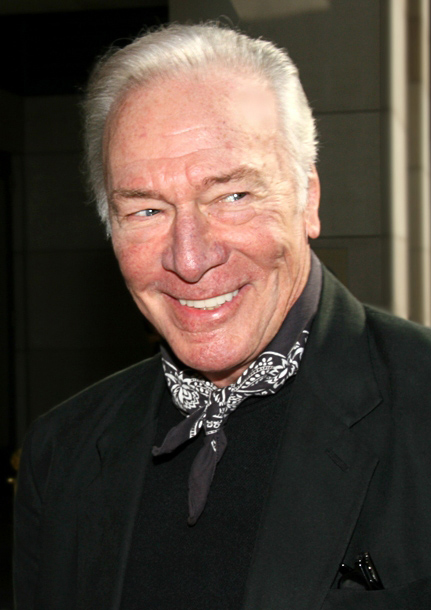
Christopher Plummer

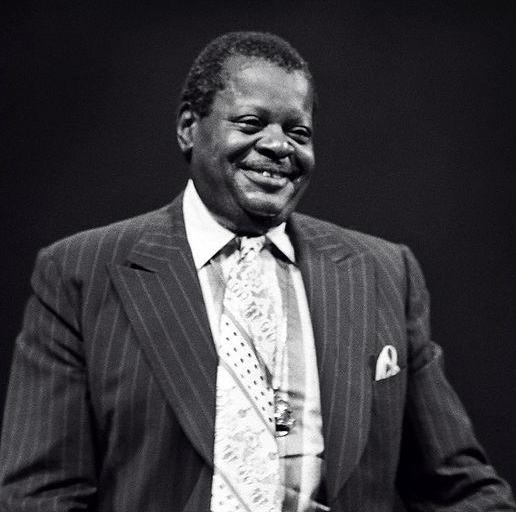
Oscar Peterson

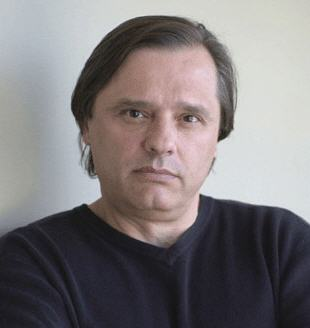
Victor Malarek

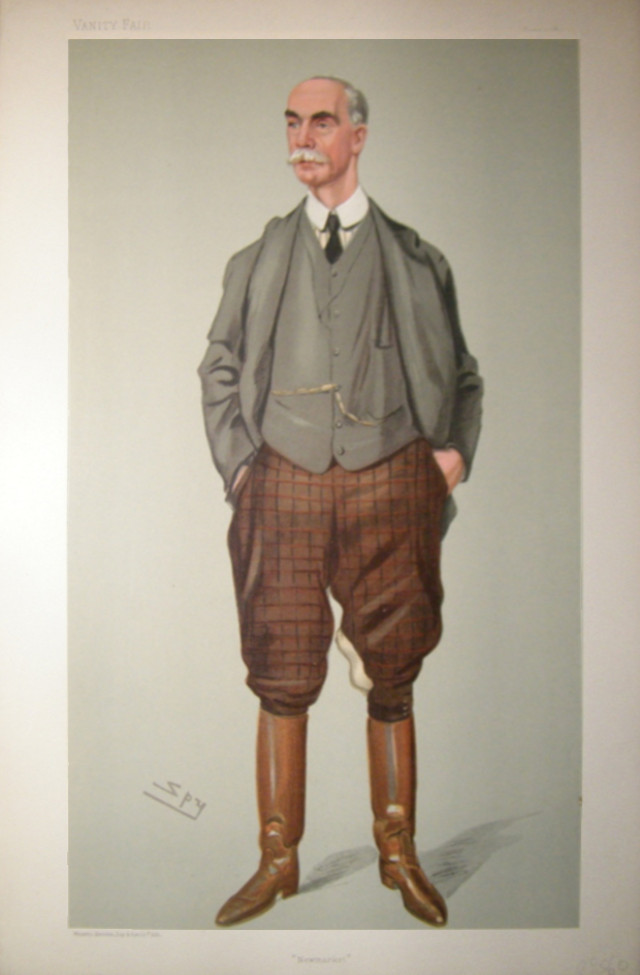
Sir Charles Rose by "Spy" for Vanity Fair

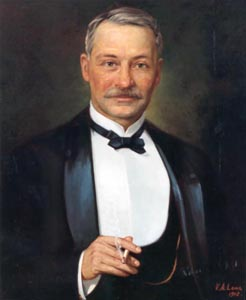
Sir Frederick Haultain

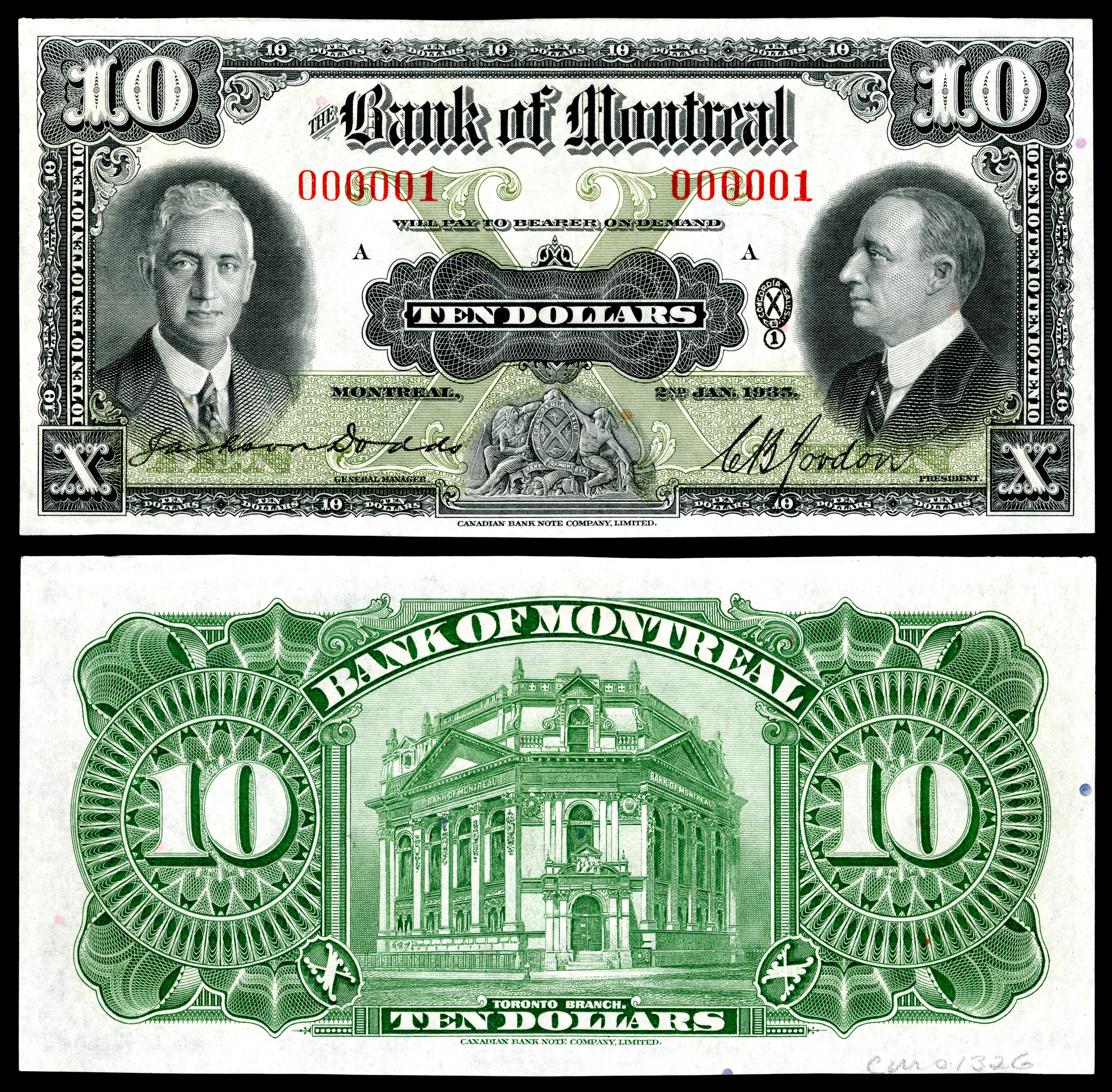
Charles Blair Gordon (right) on a Bank of Montreal banknote

- Thomas White (1830–1888), journalist and politician
- George Holt Henshaw (1831–1891), engineer
- George Washington Stephens, Sr. (1832–1904), business man and politician
- Andrew Frederick Gault (1833–1903), industrialist and philanthropist
- Charles Hamilton (1834–1919), Archbishop of Ottawa and Metropolitan of Canada
- Isidore Gordon Ascher (1835–1914), British-Canadian novelist and poet
- William Watson Ogilvie (1835–1900), miller and soldier
- John Lorn McDougall (1838–1909), Ontario business man
- Henry Birks (1840–1928), business man
- William Dawson LeSueur (1840–1917), civil servant and author
- Henry George Vennor (1840–1884), geologist and ornithologist
- Henry Aylmer (1843–1918), soldier and politician
- Charles Blackwell (1843–1906), civil engineer
- Frederick Montizambert (1843–1929), physician and civil servant
- George Campbell MacDougall (1843–1892), stockbroker
- Christopher Benfield Carter (1844–1906), politician
- David Ross McCord (1844–1930), lawyer and founder of the McCord Museum
- Sir Charles Rose, 1st Baronet (1847–1913), race horse breeder, yachtsman, and politician
- John Thomas Finnie (1847–1925), physician and politician
- George Mercer Dawson (1849–1901), geologist and surveyor
- Sir Edward Seaborne Clouston, 1st Baronet (1849–1912), banker and financier
- Edward Black Greenshields (1850–1917), business man and art collector
- Jeffry Hall Brock (1850–1915), business man
- Sydney Arthur Fisher (1850–1921), politician
- John Stewart McLennan (1853–1939), publisher and politician
- William Henry Drummond (1854–1907), humorist and poet
- Charles Henry Gould (1855–1919), librarian and musician
- Alexander Webb Morris (1856 –1935), business man and politician
- Sir Frederick W. A. G. Haultain (1857–1942), politician and judge
- William Douw Lighthall (1857–1954), lawyer, historian, novelist, poet and philosopher
- James Fielding Sweeny (1857–1940), Anglican Bishop of Toronto and Metropolitan of Ontario
- William Alexander Weir (1858–1929), lawyer, politician, and judge
- Frank Dawson Adams (1859–1942), geologist
- Charles Ernest Gault (1861–1946), politician
- Frederick George Scott (1861–1944), poet, chaplain, author (The Great War As I Saw It)
- Ernest J. Chambers (1862–1925), Gentleman Usher of the Black Rod
- Peter Samuel George Mackenzie (1862–1914), lawyer and politician
- Sir Mortimer Barnett Davis (1866–1928), business man and philanthropist
- James Edward Le Rossignol (1866–1959), professor of economics
- George Washington Stephens Jr. (1866–1942), politician
- Edward Maxwell (1867–1923), architect
- Sir Charles Blair Gordon (1867–1939), banker, manufacturer, and diplomat
- Octavia Ritchie (1868–1948), High School for Girls, physician and suffragist
- Charles Allan Smart (1868–1937), politician
- David Robertson Brown (1869–1946), architect
- Charles Monsarrat (1871–1940), bridge engineer
- Wilfred Lucas (1871–1940), actor, director, and screenwriter
- William Sutherland Maxwell (1874–1952), architect
- Graham Drinkwater (1875–1946), ice hockey player, business man and philanthropist
- Andrew Ross McMaster (1876–1937), politician
- Walter George Mitchell (1877–1935), lawyer and politician
- George Allen Ross (1879–1946), architect, partner in Ross and Macdonald
- Francis Alexander Caron Scrimger VC (1880–1937), doctor honoured with the Victoria Cross
- George Washington Kendall (1881–1921) sports promoter
- Talbot Mercer Papineau (1883–1917), lawyer and soldier
- George Gordon Hyde (1884–1946), lawyer and politician
- John Goodwin Lyman (1886–1967), American-born modernist painter
- Orville Sievwright Tyndale (1887–1952), judge and Chancellor of McGill University
- Irene Pavloska (1889–1962), mezzo-soprano and composer
- Joseph Cohen (1891–1973), lawyer, academic, and politician
- Anne Savage (1896–1971), artist
- George Buchanan Foster (1897–1974), First World War flying ace and lawyer
- Norma Shearer (1902–1983), actress
- John Bland (1911—2002), architect
- Albert Chartier (1912–2004), cartoonist and illustrator
- Davidson Dunton (1912–1987), journalist, administrator, and Chairman of the CBC
- Louis Dudek (1918–2001), poet, academic, and publisher
- Edward Nower (1921–2006), footballer
- Ghitta Caiserman-Roth (1923–2005), artist
- Oscar Peterson (1925–2007), jazz pianist and composer
- Maynard Ferguson (1928–2006), jazz trumpeter and bandleader
- Christopher Plummer (1929–2021), actor
- Tom Manastersky (1929–2012), Canadian Football League halfback
- Mort Ransen (1933–2021), film and television director and screenwriter
- Robert Silverman (1933–2022), cycling activist
- Alvin Cramer Segal (born 1933), business man and philanthropist
- Christina Perks (born 1935), architect
- Victor Malarek (born 1948), journalist and author
