= Donegana's Hotel =

Former building in Quebec, Canada

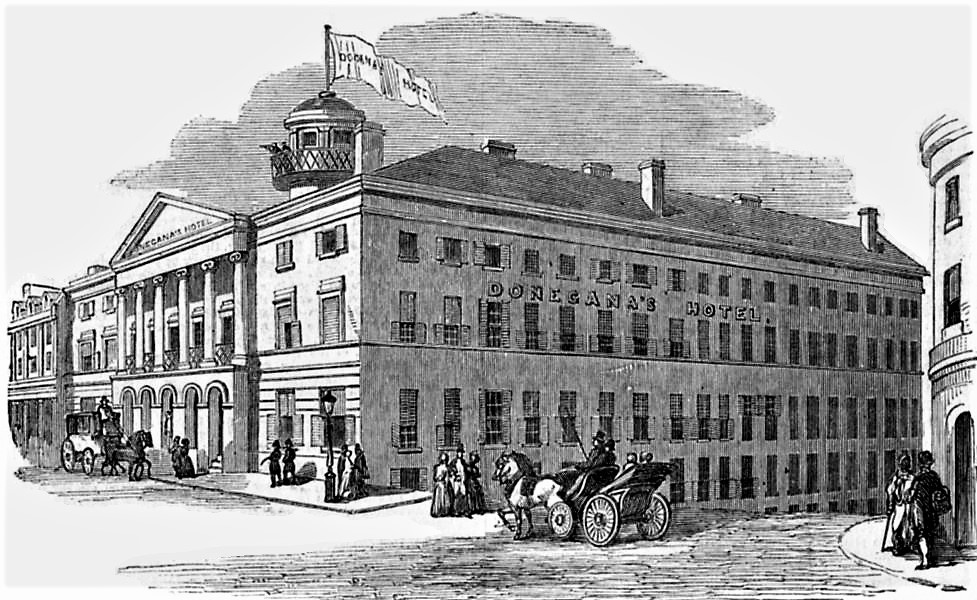
- Donegana's in The Illustrated London News
- Interactive map of the Donegana's Hotel area

General information
- Type: Private House; Vice-Regal Residence; School; Hotel
- Location: Old Montreal, Notre-Dame Street
- Coordinates: 45.5103°N 73.5525°W
- Construction started: 1821
- Renovated: 1850
- Destroyed: 1880

Donegana's Hotel, previously known as Bingham House, stood on the north-west corner of Notre-Dame Street and Bonsecours Street, a block away from Bonsecours Market in the Old Montreal district of Montreal, Quebec. Originally built as a private residence in 1821, the house served as the vice-regal residence of the Governors General of Canada from 1837 until 1843. From 1843 to 1846 it briefly housed the High School of Montreal, before the school built its own premises. The building was then bought by Jean-Marie Donegana, who enlarged it to become the largest hotel in the British Colonies. It became famous across Europe and North America, where its reputation was only equal to, if not exceeding, that of New York's Astor House. Donegana's was burnt down on 16 August 1849, in the aftermath of the Montreal Riots of 1849.

The site was sold in 1850 and the hotel rebuilt one block to the east by American management as a new Donegana Hotel, which prospered until the 1870s under hotelier Daniel Gale. Gale promoted it in New York papers as a Montreal hotel that was equal to the finest American hostelries. Confederate agent and wine merchant P. C. Martin lived there around 1863, and after the American Civil War the family of ex-President Jefferson Davis stayed at the Donegana during their time in Montreal. In 1880 the second hotel was replaced by the Hôpital Notre-Dame.

== Early years ==
Originally built as a private home, the main structure was started in 1821 for the American millionaire William Bingham (1800-1852), only son of Senator Bingham, in preparation for his marriage the following year to Marie-Charlotte Chartier de Lotbinière (1805-1866), daughter and co-heiress of the 2nd Marquis de Lotbinière. Senator Bingham was one of the wealthiest man in the United States, and the building was inspired from Lansdowne House in London, property of his friend the U. K. Prime Minister Lord Shelburne, of the Fitzmaurices, Marquess of Lansdowne. The Bingham house became a centre for fashionable society living in, and visiting, Montreal.

In 1834, the Binghams left Montreal for Paris, and for a time they leased their old home to Lord Seaton. In 1837, Lord Durham, the newly appointed Governor General of Canada, took lease of the house having chosen the imposing mansion over the run-down Château de Ramezay for his official residence. Durham required that the house was furnished in "superior style" and no expense was spared to meet his exacting standards. Governors General Lord Sydenham and afterwards Sir Charles Bagot maintained the house as their official residence until 1843, when it was sold by the Binghams who by then had made their permanent home in England at Broome Park, Kent.

In September 1843, the house became the first home of the newly enrolled students of the High School of Montreal, of whom there were 167 by the end of the session. At the end of the school's first academic year, the closing ceremony, presided over by the Hon. Peter McGill, with Lord Metcalfe presenting the prizes, was held in the large hall that had previously been the Binghams' ballroom. In 1845, the school moved to its purpose built home on Belmont Street.

== Donegana's ==
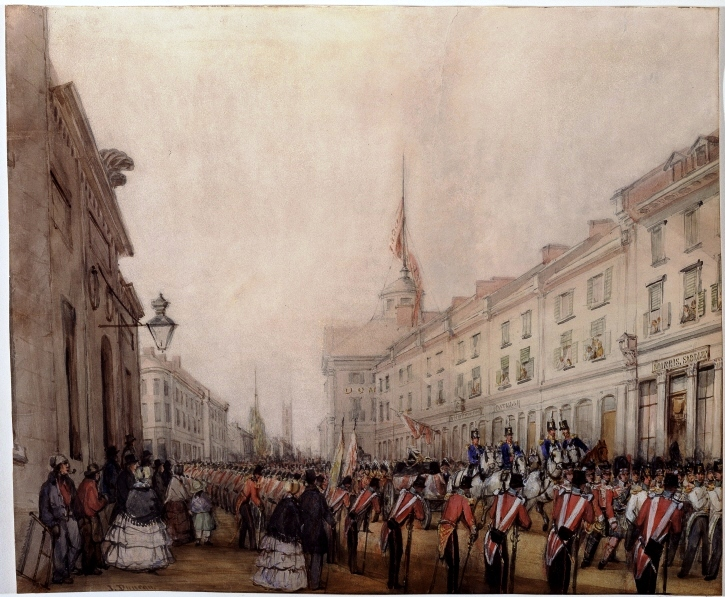
Donegana's seen flying its flag at half-mast for General Sir Benjamin d'Urban's funeral on Rue Notre-Dame, 1849

In 1845, the house was purchased by hotelier Jean-Marie Donegana, the already well-known general manager of Rasco's Hotel in Montreal. The facade of the building was kept as it had been when it was the Bingham's home, but extensive additions were made to the rear of the building. Donegana's stretched across to the Champ de Mars and in its time was the largest hotel in the British colonies. Every luxury was made available, including hot and cold baths at any hour of the day, and the gas lighting that lit the hotel was said to have given "a marvellous effect to the rich marble decorations" in the lobbies. Each of the 150 apartments had its own bathroom. The dining room measured 100 by 218 feet and the gallery surrounding the cupola that rose over the building offered a commanding 360 degree view of the city.

Though Montreal was still a comparatively small town of some 40,000 people in 1845, John Bigsby had noted 25 years previously that its inns were "as remarkable for their palatial exterior" as for their "excellent accommodation within"; remarking that Montreal was "a stirring and opulent town.. advanced in all the luxuries and comforts of high civilisation." Donegana's did not disappoint, it was said to be on a par to Astor House in New York and as good a hotel as many in London. A British Army officer who was visiting Montreal described it as "a magnificent establishment," finding the furnishings equal to its "splendid" architecture: "Everything was conducted in this hotel in the first style: the furniture was superb, and the attendance. All French waiters, most admirable, while the cuisine was of the most recherché character".

In 1847, Donegana's hosted the first Charity Ball in aid of the Montreal Maternity Hospital under the patronage of the Governor General, Lord Elgin. Not long after this event, Elgin's aide-de-camp, Lord Mark Kerr, decided to stir up some excitement in the hotel when he had heard there was an abundance of American tourists staying. He rode his horse through the three immense doors into the dining room and stepped around the table. At first the tourists were stunned and then greatly amused, and Kerr afterwards found himself showered with invitations to New York. It was also at Donegana's that members of the Montreal Hunt met to halt a Royal Artillery officer from selling their hounds. Guests included Maurice Sand and Jérôme Napoleon Bonaparte. Residents when Parliament was in session included Sir Allan Napier MacNab of Dundurn Castle and Chief Justice Joseph-Rémi Vallières de Saint-Réal.

== First home of Notre-Dame hospital ==
In 1880, the former hotel became the first home of Notre-Dame hospital, where it could host about 50 patients. By 1900, the hotel was too small for the needs of the growing institution. The hospital would move north in 1924, on Sherbrooke street where it still stands today.

== See also ==
- Ritz-Carlton Montreal
- Windsor Hotel, Montreal
