= Havanaise (Saint-Saëns) =

Composition for violin and orchestra by Camille Saint-Saëns

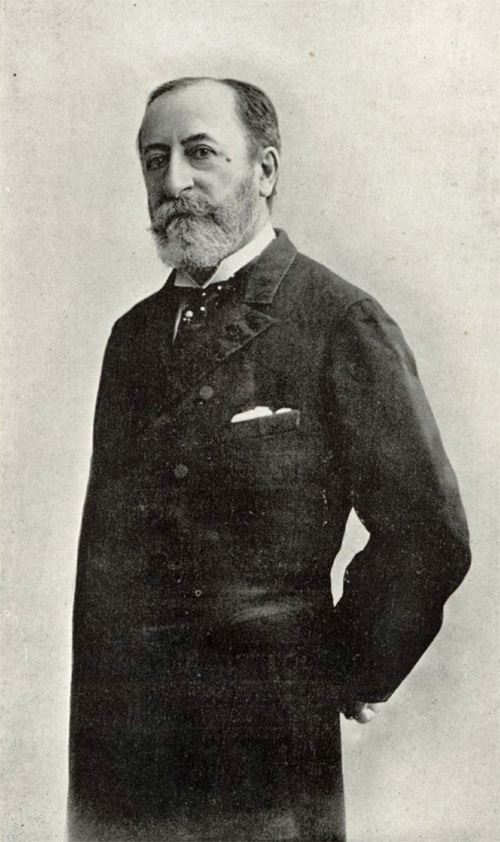
Camille Saint-Saëns c. 1880

The Havanaise in E major (French: Havanaise en mi majeur), Op. 83, is a composition for violin and orchestra based on the habanera rhythm, written in 1887 by French composer, Camille Saint-Saëns for Cuban violinist Rafael Díaz Albertini. At the January 7, 1894 orchestral premiere in Paris, the violin was played instead by Martin Pierre Marsick. It is one of the standards of the classical concertante repertoire.

== Structure ==
The composition consists of a single multi-tempo movement marked Allegretto lusinghiero – Allegro – Tempo primo – Allegretto – Allegro non troppo – Più Allegro – Allegretto – Lento and lasts around ten minutes in performance.

== In popular culture ==
A minor variation on "Havanaise", as well as the original piece, make up the main theme of the film The Ninth Gate. A brief segment is played many times on the soundtrack of Rainer Fassbinder's film Effi Briest. The initial phrase also supplies the melody to the popular song Sugartime by Charles Phillips and Odis Echols.
