= Montreal School of Theology =

Coordinates: 45°30′24″N 73°34′36″W

- Established: 1914
- Affiliations: McGill University
- Religious affiliation: Protestantism
- Director: Rev. Dr. Jesse Zink
- Location: Montreal, Quebec, Canada

The Montreal School of Theology is an ecumenical collegiate seminary located in Montreal, Quebec. Its two colleges – The Presbyterian College and the Montreal Diocesan Theological College (Dio) – are autonomous, and each is representative of a particular denomination. A third school, the United Theological College, merged with Dio in 2022 as a United Church Studies program.

The Montreal School of Theology, and each of its member colleges, is affiliated with McGill University. The School was founded in 1914.

== History ==
Established in 1914, the Montreal School of Theology began as an ecumenical initiative in theological education: the first of its kind in North America, and the 'oldest ecumenical centre for theological education in the English-speaking world'. The colleges share both pedagogical objectives, and a commitment to the preservation and propagation of their individual identities: Anglican, Presbyterian, and Congregational. To this end, each college retains its own faculty, governing body, and premises; though, historically, the expertise of faculty from the respective colleges has been shared throughout the school.

== Academics ==
The colleges in the Montreal School of theology offer three programs

- Master of Divinity (M.Div.)
- Certificate in Theology
- Diploma in Ministry

=== Accreditation and degree granting authority ===
The Montreal School of Theology was accredited by the Association of Theological Schools in the United States and Canada (ATS) in 1989, and has since retained its accreditation.

The individual member colleges of MST are endowed with authority to award the Master of Divinity of Degree independently. Due to the agreement of all member colleges to cooperate on the matter of degree conferral, no college has ever exercised their individual right to award degrees without the concurrence of the other member colleges.

=== McGill University affiliation ===
The Montreal School of Theology is affiliated with McGill University. Each of its member colleges is affiliated with the School of Religious Studies. Furthermore, MST's administrative structure, particularly in its delivery of the M.Div program, works in partnership with the School.

Additionally, several members of MST's faculty sit on committees and boards at the School of Religious Studies: both the Senate of McGill and its B.Th committee are attended by the principals of the respective member colleges. Additionally, several members of McGill's faculty sit on committees and boards at MST. The Director of the School of Religious Studies attends the Academic Committee at MST, and also holds a seat on the Board.

=== Extracurricular and outreach ===
The Montreal School of Theology, and its member colleges, has hosted a variety of workshops, conferences, events, and competitions, for participation by both students and laity.

The School's courses have included workshops on Christian Mission, Christian Theories of Justice, Congregational Leadership, Preaching, and Church Conflict. Students have also been given the opportunity of taking part in study tours to locations such as Cuba. In addition to its workshops and study tours, MST also offers awards to its students in recognition of their achievements. The Frederick Buechner Prize for Excellence in Preaching, named in honor of the Presbyterian theologian and author Frederick Buechner, is conferred upon the student judged to have excelled in the area of preaching.
