= William Lunn (educator) =

Canadian educator, businessman, and politician

- Born: July 18, 1796; Devonport, England
- Died: June 19, 1886 (aged 89); Montreal, Canada
- Occupations: Educator, businessman, politician
- Spouse: Margaret Fisher

William Lunn (July 18, 1796 – June 19, 1886) was a Canadian educator, businessman, and politician. Born in Devonport, England, Lunn moved to Canada on assignment with the Royal Navy in 1824 and remained there for the rest of his life. Lunn served in many civic and business capacities in Montreal, and worked to promote the educational interests of Protestants in Quebec at a time when education in that province was dominated by schools run by the Catholic Church.

== Early life ==
Lunn was born on July 18, 1796, to Elizabeth (née Heard) and William Lunn in Devonport, England. In 1819, he moved to Kingston, Upper Canada to manage supplies for the Admiralty. He married Margaret Fisher in 1821. Lunn stayed in Canada after the British decided to end their naval presence at Kingston in 1834. His wedding was noted for being the cause of a charivari that went on for three nights and resulted in the door of a police watch house being destroyed and several people arrested.

Lunn was a Wesleyan who wrote to Britain in 1824 requesting missionaries because the Canadian government at the time was not happy with the presence of missionaries from the United States.

== Career ==
Lunn was one of the founders of Montreal General Hospital, and a member of the board of managers at several points between 1824 and 1886. He served on the Bank of Montreal's board of governors from 1829 to 1849. In 1829 he was a member of the Montreal Library and Montreal Committee of Trade boards of directors.

In municipal politics Lunn served as a Justice of the Peace in Montreal from 1826 to 1830.

Lunn's most significant impact on Montreal was related to education. Education in Quebec in the early 19th century was dominated by the Catholic Church. In 1822 Lunn organized the British and Canadian School Society, and served as its treasurer. In 1844 he became one of the founding board members of the High School of Montreal, and in 1864 he served as chair of the Protestant Educational Association. This group existed to promote the interests of Protestants in Canadian education.

Lunn died on June 19, 1886, in Montreal. A school was named in his honour in Montreal, located on Ann Street, between William Street and Ottawa Street. The school closed down in the late 1940s.
