= Alvin Segal =

American-Canadian businessman (1933–2022)

Alvin Cramer Segal OC OQ
- Born: September 19, 1933; Albany, New York, U.S.
- Died: November 4, 2022 (aged 89)

Alvin Cramer Segal OC OQ (September 19, 1933 – November 4, 2022), previously Alvin Cramer, was an American-born Canadian businessman and philanthropist. He was chairman and chief executive officer of Peerless Clothing, a men's suit manufacturer.

== Early life ==
Alvin Cramer was born in Albany, New York, as the son of George Cramer and Betty Pearson. He attended the Arnold Avenue School in Amsterdam, New York then School No. 16 in Albany, and next the Irving Prep School for Boys. His father had died when he was seven, and when he was fourteen his mother married Moe Segal and moved to Montreal. He passed grades nine and ten at Stanstead College, then entered grade eleven at the High School of Montreal, where he was joined by his sisters Connie and Harriet. At that time, his sisters changed their name from Cramer to Segal, his stepfather's name, but he continued to be known as Cramer until some years later. He did not graduate from high school, as he failed in French, which was a compulsory subject in Montreal.

== Career ==
At age 18 he started a job on the shop floor of the Peerless Clothing company. He eventually rose to become company president and owner, and transformed the company into a major maker of men's suits for both Canadian and American markets.

== Personal life and death ==
Segal died on November 4, 2022, at the age of 89.

== Honours ==
In 2002, Segal was made a Member of the Order of Canada in recognition for being "a visionary entrepreneur" and an "outstanding spokesperson and leader for the apparel industry in Canada". In 2010, he was promoted to Officer of the Order of Canada for having "set an example of corporate philanthropy". In 2011, he was made an Officer of the National Order of Quebec. He also received a Doctor Honoris Causa of Hebrew University (2015).
