= Poznański =

Poznański (Polish pronunciation: [pɔzˈnaj̃skʲi]; feminine: Poznańska, plural: Poznańscy), also adapted into other languages as Poznansky, Posnanski or Posnansky, is a surname of Polish origin, derived from the adjectival form for the city of Poznań.

== People ==
- Alexander Poznansky (born 1950), Russian-American scholar of the life and works of Pyotr Ilyich Tchaikovsky
- Alicja Poznańska (1930–1990), Polish-Canadian writer
- Alfred 'Savoir' Poznański (1883–1934), French comedy playwright of Polish Jewish origin
- Arthur Posnansky (1873–1946), engineer, explorer, archaeologist
- Christina Poznanska Perks (born 1935), Polish-Canadian architect
- Daphna Poznanski-Benhamou (1950), French politician
- Gitel (Gertrude) Poznanski Steed (1914–1977), American cultural anthropologist
- Grzegorz Marek Poznański (born 1971), Polish diplomat and ambassador
- Gustavus Poznanski (1804–1879), cantor and religious leader, a pioneer of Reform Judaism
- Hanna Poznańska Segal (1918–2011), British psychoanalyst
- Izrael Poznański (1833–1900), Polish-Jewish businessman, textile magnate and philanthropist in Łódź
- Joe Posnanski (born 1967), American sports journalist
- Joshua Poznanski (born 1995), German Frankfurt Galaxy (ELF) player
- Lilly Ogatina Poznanski (1942–1989), politician and educator from the Solomon Islands
- Louis Poznański (born 1967), German football player
- Marek Poznański (born 1984), Polish archeologists and member of Sejm
- Mark J. Poznansky (born 1946), Canadian research scientist and science blogger
- Neil Poznansky (born 1972), Canadian thoroughbred racing jockey
- Odon Poznański (1149–1194), Duke of Greater Poland
- Renée Poznanski (born 1949), French-born Israeli historian
- Samuel Abraham Poznański (1864–1921), Polish-Jewish scholar
- Ursula Poznanski (born 1968), Austrian writer
- Zofia Poznańska (1906–1942), Polish-Jewish resistance worker
- Zofia Daszyńska-Golińska née Poznańska (1866–1934), Polish socialist politician, suffragist

== Places and objects ==
- Izrael Poznański Palace, eclecticism 19th-century palace in Łódź, Poland
- Posnansky/Fronius PF-1 White Knight, glider

Poznański being related to Poznań, Poland:

- Poznań County, powiat poznański
- Poznań Department, Departament Poznański
- Poznań protests of 1956, Poznański Czerwiec
- Adam Mickiewicz University in Poznań, Uniwersytet Poznański
- Poznań University of Technology, Politechnika Poznańska

== See also ==
- Posener
