= Tom Manastersky =

Canadian ice hockey player

Profile
- Position: Halfback

Personal information
- Born: March 7, 1929; Montreal, Quebec, Canada
- Died: March 11, 2012 (aged 83); Toronto, Ontario, Canada

Career information
- College: none - High School of Montreal

Career history
- 1946–1950: Montreal Alouettes
- 1950–1951: Montreal Canadiens - NHL
- 1952–1953: Montreal Alouettes
- 1954: Saskatchewan Roughriders

Awards and highlights
- Grey Cup champion (1949)

Thomas Timothy Manastersky (March 7, 1929 – March 11, 2012) was a Canadian athlete. He played Canadian football and ice hockey. He played in the Canadian Football League as a halfback with the Montreal Alouettes and Saskatchewan Roughriders, the youngest player in CFL history. He won the 1949 Grey Cup with the Alouettes. He also played 6 games in the National Hockey League with the Montreal Canadiens during the 1950–51 season.

== Playing career ==
Turning professional right out of high school, Manastersky played 6 seasons and 68 regular season games for his hometown Montreal Alouettes. The high point of his football career was being part of the Alouettes' first Grey Cup in 1949. He finished his career playing for the Saskatchewan Roughriders in 1954.

He was a two-sport professional athlete. He had played hockey for the Montreal Royals, Cincinnati Mohawks, and Victoria Cougars in the minor leagues, but in the 1950–51 NHL season he got called up. A big defenceman, he played six games for the Montreal Canadiens, recording 11 penalty minutes.

He died on March 11, 2012, following a lengthy illness.

== Career statistics ==
=== Regular season and playoffs ===
			Regular season					Playoffs
Season	Team	League	GP	G	A	Pts	PIM	GP	G	A	Pts	PIM
1944–45	High School of Montreal	HS-CA	—	—	—	—	—	—	—	—	—	—
1945–46	Montreal Junior Royals	QJAHA	19	0	4	4	23	—	—	—	—	—
1945–46	Montreal Royals	QSHL	1	0	0	0	2	—	—	—	—	—
1946–47	Montreal Junior Royals	QJAHA	25	1	3	4	68	7	0	1	1	29
1946–47	Montreal Royals	QSHL	3	0	0	0	2	—	—	—	—	—
1947–48	Montreal Junior Royals	QJAHA	8	1	1	2	16	13	0	1	1	38
1948–49	Montreal Junior Royals	QJAHA	30	2	5	7	63	10	2	4	6	16
1948–49	Montreal Royals	QSHL	2	0	0	0	0	—	—	—	—	—
1948–49	Montreal Junior Royals	M-Cup	—	—	—	—	—	15	1	6	7	67
1949–50	Montreal Royals	QSHL	27	2	7	9	87	3	0	0	0	25
1950–51	Montreal Canadiens	NHL	6	0	0	0	11	—	—	—	—	—
1950–51	Montreal Royals	QSHL	1	0	0	0	0	—	—	—	—	—
1950–51	Vancouver Canucks	PCHL	18	1	1	2	45	—	—	—	—	—
1950–51	Cincinnati Mohawks	AHL	5	0	0	0	18	—	—	—	—	—
NHL totals			6	0	0	0	11	—	—	—	—	—
