= The Presbyterian College, Montreal =

Coordinates: 45°30′15″N 73°34′29″W

The Presbyterian College, Montreal affiliated with McGill University
- Type: Presbyterian College affiliated with Public university
- Established: 1865; 161 years ago
- Affiliations: ATS, CUSID,
- Principal: Roland De Vries
- Faculty: 7
- Administrative staff: 5
- Location: Montreal, Quebec, Canada
- Campus: Urban Downtown: 32 ha (80 acres) Macdonald Campus: 6.5 km^{2} (1,600 acres) at McGill University
- Colours: blue & Red
- Website: www.presbyteriancollege.ca/

The Presbyterian College/Le Collège Presbytérien is a Theological College of the Presbyterian Church in Canada, and is affiliated with McGill University through its School of Religious Studies. The Presbyterian College's student base comes from across Canada and around the world. It is located at 3495 University Street, Montreal, in Quebec.

== Mission ==
The Presbyterian College is a theological College of The Presbyterian Church in Canada. It is one of two members of the Montreal School of Theology, along with the Anglican Montreal Diocesan Theological College (whose United Church Studies program is the successor to the former United Theological College).

== Programs of The Presbyterian College ==
- Master of Divinity (M.Div.)
- Diploma in Ministry
- Maitrise en Étude Théologique Pratique
- McGill Bachelor of Theology (B.Th.)
- McGill Master of Sacred Theology degree (S.T.M.)

== History ==
The official history of the college began in the early 1860s, but the date of 1865 is the benchmark as the Canada Presbyterian Church approved the request of the Presbytery, to complement that denomination's only Theological College, Knox College, located in Toronto.

Lay leadership in this cause came from prominent Montrealers John Redpath and McGill Principal John William Dawson.

Classes began in the autumn of 1867 in the basement of Erskine Presbyterian Church in downtown Montreal, with Professor (later Principal) Donald Harvey MacVicar.

The college remained within the Presbyterian Church in Canada after church union, although most of the faculty departed. The 1925-1926 academic year was held from the Anglican Diocesan College, until the provincial Quebec Courts awarded the College back to the "continuing" Presbyterian Church in Canada.

During World War II, Presbyterian College was used for soldier training, and temporarily moved to Toronto, Ontario, and joined with Knox College, from 1943 to 1946. Some graduates of the College, in the spirit of good natured competition, still refer to that period as "the Babylonian captivity"!

== Buildings and features ==
The first building was completed in 1873, and located on McTavish Street. In 1882, the David Morrice Hall containing a large library, dining hall, convocation hall, offices, and residences was completed. These building served the College until the 1950s. By the 1950s, the older buildings were in need of repair; rather than embarking on lengthy renovations, Presbyterian College and McGill University transferred lands. The university took the McTavish Street site, and Presbyterian College constructed a new building on the corner of University Avenue and Milton Street, just north of Sherbrooke Street, and adjacent to the aforementioned Diocesan College. The building was dedicated on April 28, 1963. The chapel, was renovated in the 1980s, then rebuilt following a fire in November 1990. In recent years, the college has rented out two floors of its residences as dormitories for McGill University students.

== Alumni ==
In 1890, one of the Presbyterian College's most famous alumni graduated, in the person of James Naismith. He did not go to a congregation; instead, he went to serve with the YMCA in the United States. His invention of the sport of basketball, brought him back to Montreal, just before his 1939 death, to receive the Honorary Doctor of Divinity.

Another notable alum was James R. Reid (1885), who became president of both the College of Montana (1889-1893) as well as the second president of Montana State University (1894-1904).

Keith Markell's 1986 (posthumous) history of Presbyterian College cited some famous alumni; Most were in Canadian Church circles, including the first Moderator of the United Church of Canada, George C. Pidgeon. Another alumnus, who like James Naismith (see above), gained a reputation away from the pastorate and/or academia, was John Weir Foote (1934 Graduate), a heroic World War II Chaplain, and later Ontario Cabinet Minister.

W. G. Brown (1902) was a minister who fought for the continuation of the PCC from Red Deer, Alberta, where he served from 1907 to 1925, then moved to Saskatoon, Saskatchewan where he re-organized the Presbyterian Minority groups into St. Andrew's Church in Saskatoon; and died after he was elected to the Canadian Parliament in 1940.

== Partnership ==
In 1969, Presbyterian College entered into an agreement with McGill University Faculty of Religious Studies and the other Theological Colleges (United College and Diocesan College), that renewed an agreement made in 1912, that was dissolved following 1925. In 1981, the Institute de Théologie de Montréal was established, to provide teaching in French, although French courses had been provided from 1869 to 1925, and the College became known as The Presbyterian College/Le Collège Presbytérien. Other significant partnerships are with the Montreal School of Theology (MST), Institut de Théologie pour la Francophonie and Université Laval.

== Principals ==
- Donald Harvey MacVicar* (1873–1902)
- John Scrimger* (1904–1915)
- D. H. Fraser (1916–1929)
- Francis Scott MacKenzie (1929–1945)
- Robert Lennox (1948–1969)
- William Klempa (1978–1998)
- John A. Vissers (1999–2013)
- Dale Woods (2014–2020)
- Roland De Vries (2021–)

During the periods between settled Principals (especially 1969-1978), there were a number of "Acting Principals".

== Histories of the university ==
- Robert Campbell, A History of the St. Gabriel Street Church, Montreal, 1887.
- John H. MacVicar, The Life of Principal MacVicar, by His Son, 1904.
- John. S. Moir, Enduring Witness, (Third Edition), 2004. (The Official History of the Presbyterian Church in Canada)
- Dr. Stanley Frost.'The History of McGill in Relation to the Social, Economic and Cultural Aspects of Montreal and Quebec' (Montreal: McGill-Queen's University Press, 1979).
- Dr. Stanley Frost. 'McGill University: For the Advancement of Learning.' Vols I.(Montreal: McGill-Queen’s University Press © 1980)
- Dr. Stanley Frost. 'McGill University: For the Advancement of Learning.' Vol II.(Montreal: McGill-Queen’s University Press © 1984)
- H. Keith Markell 'The Faculty of Religious Studies, McGill University, 1948-1978' (Montreal: Faculty of Religious Studies, 1979)
- Prof. Peter F. McNally McGill University: For the Advancement of Learning (1970–2002) Vol III(Montreal: McGill-Queen’s University Press © 2002)
- Brian J. Young 'The Making and Unmaking of a University Museum: The McCord, 1921-1996' (Montreal: McGill-Queen's University Press, June 1, 2000)
