= Henry George Vennor =

English geologist and meteorologist

Henry George Vennor (30 December 1840 – 8 June 1884) was a Canadian geologist and ornithologist who became well known as a weather forecaster.

Vennor was the son of Henry Vennor, a hardware merchant, by his marriage to Marion Paterson, and was educated at Philips School and the High School of Montreal. As a boy, he built up a collection of dead reptiles. After high school he attended McGill College, where he studied natural sciences and civil engineering under the geologists John William Dawson and Thomas Sterry Hunt, graduating with honours in 1860.

While a student, Vennor collected Montreal Island fossils and wrote on ornithology for the Canadian Naturalist and Geologist and the British American Magazine of Toronto. After McGill, he joined the trading company of John Frothingham and William Workman in Montreal, then in 1865 accepted an apprenticeship under Sir William Edmond Logan, director of the Geological Survey of Canada, becoming a full member a year later. For fifteen years he worked on the geology of Ontario and Pontiac County, Quebec, paying close attention to the Survey's aim of assisting economic development by mining.

In 1866 Vennor's work was connected with the finding of gold in Precambrian rocks at a mine in Madoc Township, Hastings County, correctly predicting that the resulting gold rush would not last long. In 1871, he discovered apatite in the township of Loughborough, Ontario. In 1872, he reported phosphate deposits in Ottawa County, Quebec, where several mines were later developed. Most of his geological work was published in the reports of the Geological Survey of Canada, but in 1867 he wrote a paper on the Precambrian Shield stratigraphy of Hastings County for the Quarterly Journal of the Geological Society of London and was elected as a member in 1870. On the ornithological front, his book Our Birds of Prey was published in 1876, with illustrations by William Notman.

Vennor resigned from the Geological Survey of Canada in 1881, giving the reason that he had interests in land for phosphate mining which parliament was legislating to make a conflict of interest. He had also had various disagreements with Alfred Selwyn, and five years of his survey work were never published.

In 1875, as a student of weather patterns, Vennor correctly predicted in the Montreal newspapers a green Christmas and a muddy New Year's Day, thus beginning to establish a reputation for weather forecasting. In 1877 he published the first Vennor's Almanac, which began to appear annually and sold well, as its forecasting was generally correct. In 1881 there came a United States edition. At the end of that year, Vennor was visited in Montreal by Mark Twain, who said of him in an after-dinner speech at the Windsor Hotel "Canada has a reputation for magnificent Winter weather, and has a prophet who is bound to deliver it."

From 1882 to 1883 Vennor issued a monthly publication, Vennor's Weather Bulletin, and was still working on his almanac when he died in 1884. His death was reported on the front pages of the New York Times and the Montreal Gazette. His almanac was taken over by Walter H. Smith and continued to be published.

About 1870, Vennor married Mary Smith Wilkins (born 1845). In the 1885 edition of the almanac, W. H. Smith reported that Vennor had left behind him a wife and three children. Mary Smith Vennor died in November 1920 and was buried at Mount Royal Cemetery, Montreal.

== Selected publications ==
- Henry George Vennor, Report on Parts of the Counties of Leeds, Frontenac and Lanark: with Notes on the Gold of Marmora (1869, reprinted in paperback 2017)
- Henry George Vennor, Our Birds of Prey: or, The Eagles, Hawks and Owls of Canada (1876)
- Vennor's Almanac and Weather Record for 1877-78
- Vennor's Almanac and Weather Record for 1882 (J. M. Stoddart & Co., Philadelphia., 1881)
