= Andrew Frederick Gault =

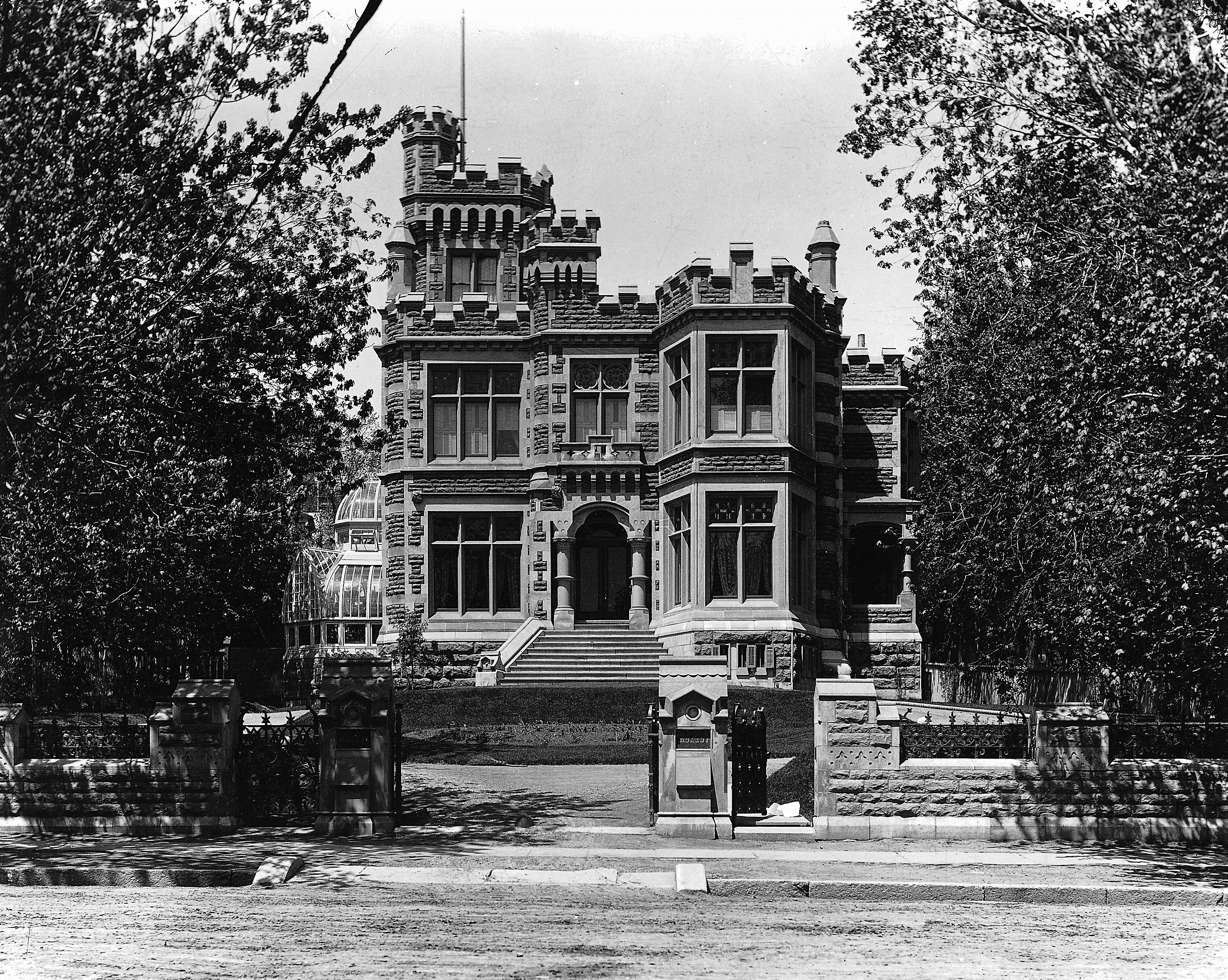
"Rokeby", Gault's house on Sherbrooke Street, Montreal, about 1885

Andrew Frederick Gault (14 April 1833 – 7 July 1903) was an Ulster-born Canadian merchant, industrialist, and philanthropist known as the Cotton King of Canada.

Born in Strabane, Ireland, Gault was the youngest son of Leslie Gault, an Anglo-Irish merchant and shipowner in County Tyrone and his wife Mary Hamilton. His mother was from an old family in County Donegal. His father was a general trader in Strabane who branched out into shipping, sending emigrant ships to New Brunswick and the United States, to return with timber and grain. In 1841 Leslie Gault lost three ships at sea and also lost money on grain and timber, due to falling markets. In 1842 he himself emigrated with his family to Lower Canada to make a fresh start in Montreal, the mercantile centre of British North America, but nine months later he died of cholera. His widow returned to Ireland. Their son, Mathew Hamilton Gault, aged twenty, took control of the business in Montreal, while Andrew Gault attended the new High School of Montreal.

On leaving school, Gault joined the dry goods firm of Walter McFarlane, and from 1853 to 1858 he was in partnership with James B. Stevenson as Gault, Stevenson and Co., then formed a company with his brother Robert Leslie Gault, as Gault Brothers and Company, later joined by a brother-in-law, Samuel Finley. Andrew Gault was the leading partner. In June 1863 its value was estimated at $31,000, with sales between $75,000 and $100,000 a year. By 1873 sales of Gault Brothers and Co. reached some $2,000,000, and they continued to grow, with branches in Manchester, Winnipeg, and Victoria. In 1896 it was incorporated as Gault Brothers' Company Limited, with a capital of $1 million. In the 1870s Gault and his brother Matthew Hamilton Gault made investments in cotton textiles. In 1872 Andrew invested more than $100,000 to build a cotton mill at Cornwall, Ontario, the Stormont Manufacturing Works. The mill was destroyed by fire in 1874, with the insurance paying only $38,000, against replacement costs of $250,000, and it was only in 1879 that a new mill was built, the Stormont Cotton Manufacturing Company Limited.

Gault had investments in many businesses, including the Dominion Commercial Travellers' Association (1875), Farnham Beet Root Sugar Co. (1879), Corriveau Silk Manufacturing Co. (1883), Citizens Gas Company of Montreal (1883), Globe Woollen Mills Co. Ltd (1887), Canadian Woolen Mills Litd (1887), Campbellford Woolen Mills Co. (1887), Crescent Manufacturing Co. (1896), Havana Electric Tramway Co. (1898), Boas Manufacturing Co. (1898), the Shawinigan Water & Power Company, and Trinidad Electric Light and Tramway Co. (1901).

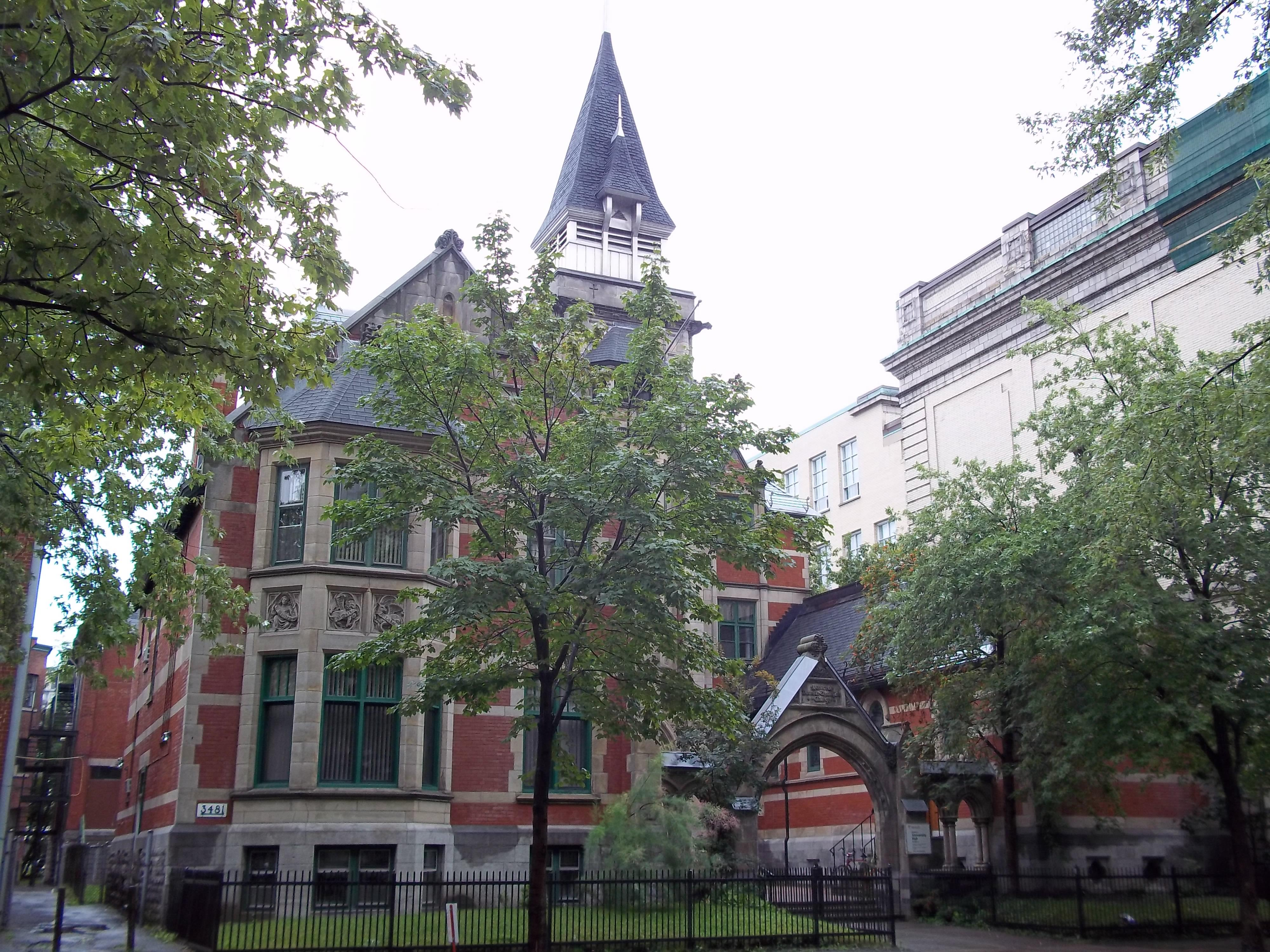
Building of the Montreal Diocesan Theological College

On 12 July 1864 Gault married Louisa Sarah Harman, and they had several stillbirths, two Don's who died in infancy, and a daughter and a son who survived, Lillian Mary Louisa, born 1877, and Andrew Hamilton, born in 1882.

According to the family, Gault's hope for a healthy son caused him to promise Bishop William Bennett Bond that if God would grant this wish he would give a building for the Montreal Diocesan Theological College, which in due course he did. He also acted as a philanthropist towards other educational causes, giving away more money than he left when he died, and was the founder of the Gault Institute at Salaberry-de-Valleyfield.
