= Christina Perks =

Canadian architect

Christina Poznanska Perks
- Born: Krystyna Poznanska; 1935 (age 90–91)
- Education: McGill University, Montreal, Quebec
- Occupation: Architect
- Practice: George F. Eber Architects, Public Works Canada, Global Affairs Canada, Perks+Penny
- Projects: Canadian Embassies in Washington, London, Beijing, Tokyo, and other cities, Lester B. Pearson Building, Sermons From Science Pavilion, Alcan Aquarium Pavilion

Christina Poznanska Perks, OAA, FRAIC (born 1935) is a Canadian architect known for her contributions to the public sector by managing the design and construction of Canadian Embassies. Throughout her career she has been an advocate for women's rights in the architecture industry. In celebration of the first woman president (Ellis Galea Kirkland) of the OAA Perks responded with "...Ms. Kirkland has moved from the usual reported role of woman as victim to an active shaper of the future environment. Hurrah!" She currently resides in Toronto, Ontario.

== Early life and education ==
Born Krystyna Poznanska near Warsaw, Poland, Perks left her home and moved to Montreal, Quebec in 1939. After graduating from Montreal High School in 1951, she began completing her bachelor's degree in architecture (B.Arch) at McGill University, finishing in 1957. While completing her degree, Perks spent her summer holidays working at architecture firms doing work such as drafting.

== Career ==
By 1958, Perks, at age 23, had become a licensed architect. She then moved with her husband and two-year-old son to his home in Bermuda where she subsequently started her own practice since the only firm on the island did not hire 'girls'. Contrary to beliefs that construction was more suited for men, her architecture practice "flourished" and she completed a variety of projects. "I was grateful for not having been hired for some menial tasks as, clearly, my career in Bermuda was so much more satisfying than it would have been as an employee," she wrote later.

After moving back to Montreal, Perks worked with the office of George F. Eber as Project Architect on two buildings, the Sermons From Science Pavilion and the Alcan Aquarium for the Expo 67. She then moved to Ottawa and served on several senior-level government positions at Public Works Canada. Positions consisted of Director of Facilities Development for External Affairs, Senior Policy Adviser and Senior Project Manager. During her time there (1966–1970), she established the official Planning Section of the department of which she was principal. Starting a private practice in Calgary in 1972, Perks developed and planned large commercial projects before returning to Ottawa in 1975 to work for the Foreign Affairs Department once more.

As Director of Facilities Development and later as Embassy Project Deputy Director, Perks was crucial in overseeing the design of Canadian embassies across the world. Some of her notable projects include the embassies in Tokyo, London, Beijing, Paris, Mexico City, Lagos, Riyadh, Washington, Moscow, and Belgrade. Her work has been described as the management of physical planning, design, and construction of buildings to support Canada's overseas operations. This includes the process of procuring embassy projects as well as the selection of Canadian architecture firms to provide a design proposal.

After retiring from her work in the public sector, Perks continued to remain active in the design industry and founded a small architectural practice in Toronto with partner Sheila Penny named Perks+Penny (1992–1994). They received several commissions from Canada Post and private families. Around the same time, Perks also started acting as Registrar for the Royal Architectural Institute of Canada (RAIC) and continued to do so until 1997.

== Notable projects ==
- Lestor B. Pearson Building in Ottawa, with WZHM Architects (1973).
- Embassy of Canada, Washington, D.C., with Arthur Erickson (1989)
- Embassy of Canada, Beijing, with Macy DuBois (1989)
- Embassy of Canada, Tokyo, with Raymond Moriyama (1991)
- Embassy of Canada, Mexico City, with Étienne Gaboury (1982)
- Embassy of Canada, Paris, with Jean-Paul Viguier (1970)

== Memberships ==
- Alberta Association of Architects (AAA), 1971–1975
- Ontario Association of Architects (OAA), 1969, Life Member
- Royal Architectural Institute of Canada (RAIC), Fellow 1978
- Royal Institute of British Architects (RIBA), Associate
- Ordre des architectes du Québec (OAQ), 1958–1970
