= Nower Lodge School =

- Coldharbour Lane; Dorking; Surrey; RH4 3BT; England, United Kingdom

Information
- Type: Private, co-educational
- Established: 1871
- Head of school: Anthony Young
- Color: Blue
- Affiliation: Church of England
- Closure: Merged with Stanway School, Dorking in 2002

Nower Lodge School was a co-educational private preparatory school based in Coldharbour Lane, Dorking, Surrey, England for students aged 2 to 13.

Nower Lodge School was founded in 1871 and merged with Stanway School, Dorking in 2002 to form New Lodge School on the Stanway site. The merged school closed in Summer 2007 due to an ongoing decline in pre-preparatory student numbers.
