= Robert Silverman (cycling activist) =

Canadian cycling activist (1933–2022)

- Born: 30 November 1933; Montreal, Quebec, Canada
- Died: 20 February 2022 (aged 88); Sainte-Agathe-des-Monts, Quebec, Canada
- Education: High School of Montreal; Sir George Williams University
- Occupation: Cycling activist

Robert "Bicycle Bob" Silverman (30 November 1933 – 20 February 2022) was a Canadian cycling activist in Montreal.

== Biography ==
Silverman grew up in the Snowdon neighborhood of Montreal and attended the High School of Montreal and Sir George Williams University. At the age of 25, with financial help from his father, he opened a bookstore on Stanley Street. A Trotskyist, he had no incentive for profit and often gave books away to customers, driving him into bankruptcy.

While studying in France in 1969, Silverman discovered great enjoyment from cycling. Encouraged by his wife, Edith, he rode his bicycle to his French lessons. Upon his return to Montreal in 1970, he purchased a second-hand bicycle during an era in which cycling in the city was rare. In 1975, he co-founded the group Le Monde à bicyclette to fight for better bicycle safety in Montreal. In 1977, he attempted to organize an international cycling foundation, saying "Cyclists of all countries, unite. You have nothing to lose but your chains! Let's build International Cycling". He proposed the creation of a multilingual library and an international liaison bulletin.

He campaigned for reforms including bike lanes, allowing cyclists to take bicycles onto the Montreal Metro (subway), and providing a way for cyclists to cross the bridges over the St. Lawrence River.

Silverman died in Sainte-Agathe-des-Monts on 20 February 2022, at the age of 88.
