= Nower Wood =

Nature reserve in Surrey, England

Coordinates: 51.278°N 0.290°W

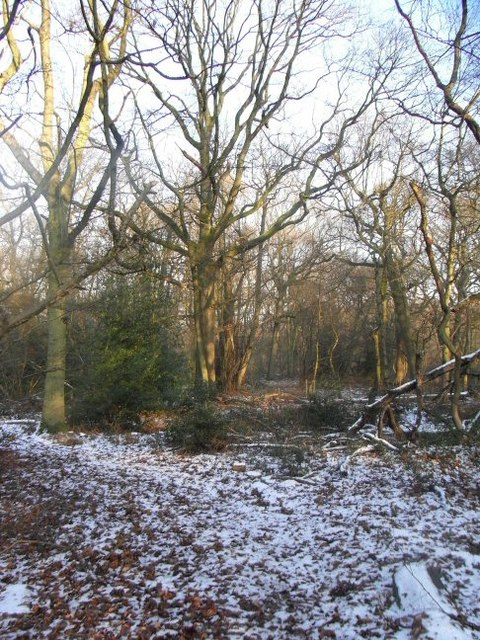
- Interactive map of Nower Wood
- Type: Nature reserve
- Location: Leatherhead, Surrey
- OS grid: TQ193546
- Area: 33 hectares (81 acres)
- Manager: Surrey Wildlife Trust

Nower Wood is a 33-hectare (81-acre) nature reserve south-west of Leatherhead in Surrey. It is owned and managed by Surrey Wildlife Trust.

Nower Wood is an educational reserve, which hosts school visits and other events for members of the public. It is mainly ancient oak woodland with areas of hazel coppice, chalk grassland, and heath. The ponds are used for pond dipping.

== Description ==
Nower Wood is a 33 ha (81-acre) nature reserve in Surrey, England. It is a Site of Nature Conservation Interest and forms part of the Surrey Hills Area of Outstanding Natural Beauty. The woodland is owned by the Surrey Wildlife Trust and operates as an outdoor classroom. There are no public rights of way through the site. The area provides a habitat for vertebrates including adders, roe deer, badgers, foxes, dormice and great crested newts. Tree species include oak, beech, elm, sweet chestnut and coppiced hazel. Birds include the woodcock and wood warbler.

The reserve is at the head of the Little Switzerland valley and adjoins Headley Warren, an area of chalk downland. The high ground of Nower Wood, which reaches 191 m (627 ft) above ordnance datum, is formed of the Reading Beds, which overlie the chalk beneath. The five ponds on the site were dug by hand to harvest and store water for Headley Court.

== History ==
Although Nower Wood is not explicitly mentioned in Domesday Book of 1086, the land is thought to have been part of the woodland belonging to the manor of Headley. The oldest surviving written record is from 1313, in which it appears as La Ore. In 1332, it was noted as the residence of Thomas ate Nore. The name is thought to mean "slope" or "hillside".

In 1879, as part of the break up of the Ashtead Park estate, Nower Wood was sold together with Headley Court Farm. It was part of the Cunliffe estate until 1971, when it was offered for sale at auction with permission to fell the trees already secured.

Under the leadership of Humphrey Mackworth-Praed, Surrey Naturalists' Trust (now Surrey Wildlife Trust) developed a plan to buy part of the wood. The trust was the only bidder and secured 27 ha (67 acres) at the top of the hill, considered the most important part in ecological terms. The price was £23,000, paid by a bank loan. The trust immediately launched an appeal for funds and cleared the debt in 1975. A further 5.7 ha (14 acres) of woodland were subsequently purchased for an additional £4,000.

A car park was approved at Nower Wood in 1973. A volunteer team was created in 1976 to teach visiting schoolchildren and the first teaching-warden was appointed in 1977. A temporary classroom, acquired second hand from Surrey County Council, was erected at the site in 1978.

In March 1986, the Dorking Advertiser reported that Nower Wood was attracting 4,000 visitors per year. Around 100 trees were lost in the great storm of 1987, the majority of those felled were oak, sweet chestnut and beech. A toilet block was installed in 1991.

In 2001, Surrey Wildlife Trust was awarded a £440,000 grant by the Heritage Lottery Fund to support a range of projects at sites across the county. At Nower Wood, this money was used to enhance the visitor experience for disabled people and projects included the installation of wheelchair-accessible platforms at Top Pond for pond dipping.

A campaign to raise funds for a new teaching centre was launched in 2015, with the support of Surrey Wildlife Trust patron, Judi Dench. Construction of the new facility, designed by the Wates Group and part-funded by a Heritage Lottery Foundation grant, began in 2016. The new centre was opened by Sophie, Countess of Wessex in April 2017.
