= Edward Nower =

Canadian football player (1921–2006)

Red Nower
Profile
- Position: Fullback

Personal information
- Born: June 21, 1921; Montreal, Quebec, Canada
- Died: September 19, 2006 (aged 85)

Career information
- College: none - High School of Montreal

Career history
- 1941: Montreal Bulldogs
- 1942: Rockland (QRFU Intermediate)
- 1944: St. Hyacinthe-Donnacona Navy
- 1945: Montreal Hornets
- 1948–49: Montreal Alouettes

Awards and highlights
- 2× Grey Cup champion (1944, 1949)

Edward "Red" Nower (June 21, 1921 - September 19, 2006) was a Grey Cup champion Canadian Football League player. He played fullback.

A native Montrealer, Nower first won the Grey Cup with the champion St. Hyacinthe-Donnacona Navy team. After a season with the Montreal Hornets, he joined the Montreal Alouettes in 1948 and was part of the Larks first Grey Cup championship. He worked with an electrical utility while playing with the Als.
