= Montreal Diocesan Theological College =

Canadian Christian seminary

Coordinates: 45.50629°N 73.57576°W

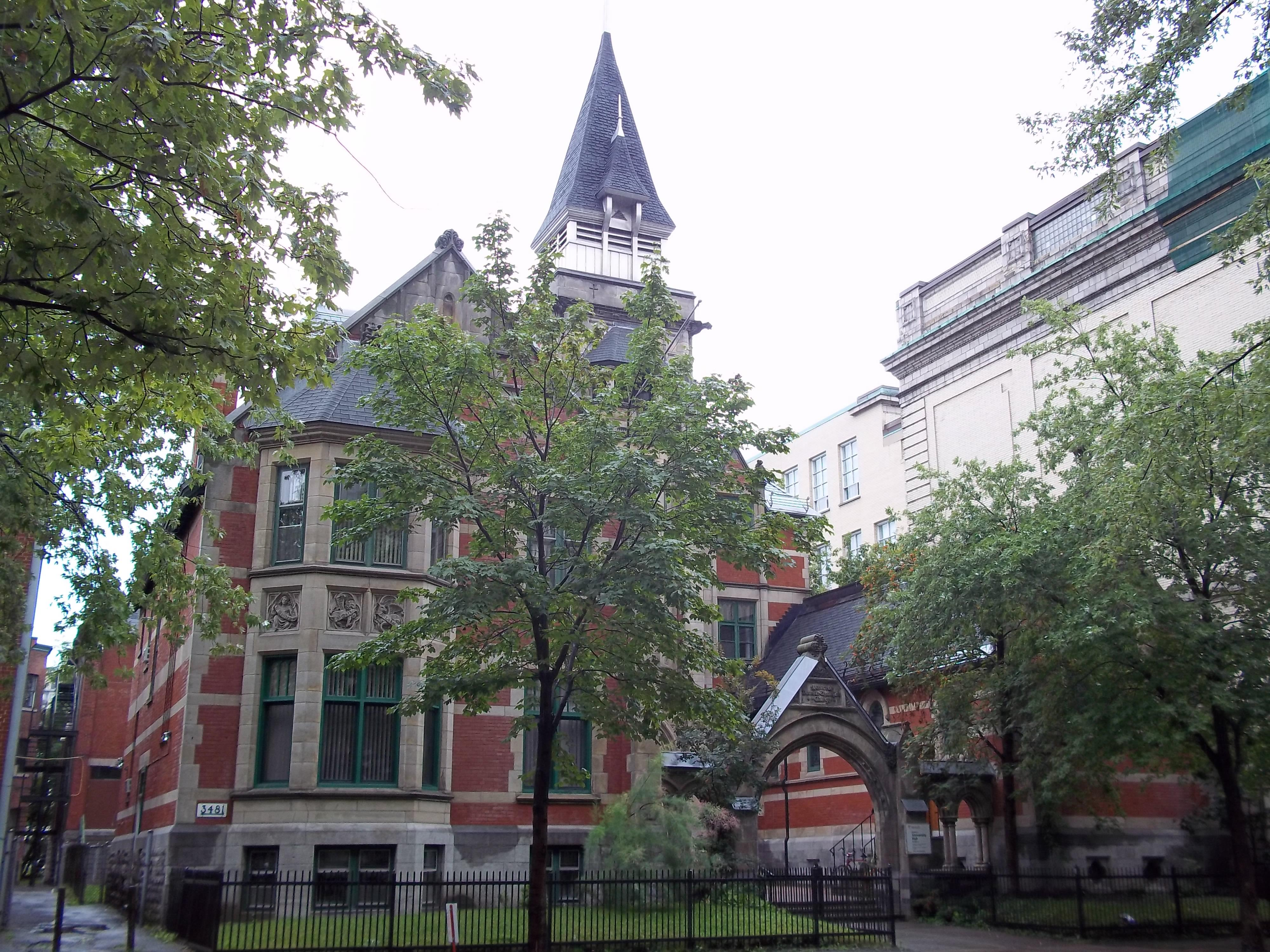
Former Montreal Diocesan Theological College building

Montreal Diocesan Theological College (known as Montreal Dio) is a theological seminary of the Anglican Church of Canada. It offers the Master of Divinity, Diploma in Ministry, to candidates for ordination and other students, from Anglican, United Church, and other traditions. It also offers a distance education program, the Reading and Tutorial Course in Theology, leading to the Licentiate in Theology.

== Architecture ==
Montreal Diocesan Theological College

Andrew Taylor designed the former Montreal Diocesan Theological College building at University Street near Milton Street, 1895–96, mostly funded by the philanthropist Andrew Frederick Gault.

A World War I memorial window (1935) by Charles William Kelsey depicting Saint Stephen the Martyr was dedicated to Albert Withey of the 24th Canadian Battalion.

== History and affiliation ==
The college is a founding member of the ecumenical Montreal School of Theology, is affiliated with the McGill University School of Religious Studies, and is accredited by the Association of Theological Schools.

Beginning in 2021, the neighbouring United Theological College began to integrate its operations into Dio. In 2022, UTC's academic offering transitioned into a United Church studies program at Dio, with UTC beginning to wind down its legal existence.
