= William Gawtress Raymond =

Canadian politician

Member of Parliament for Brantford
- In office December 1921 – October 1925
- Preceded by: William Foster Cockshutt
- Succeeded by: riding dissolved

Personal details
- Born: William Gawtress Raymond; 24 March 1855 London, England
- Died: 23 April 1942 (aged 87)
- Party: Liberal
- Profession: merchant, postmaster

William Gawtress Raymond (24 March 1855 – 23 April 1942) was a Liberal party member of the House of Commons of Canada. He was born in London, England and became a merchant and postmaster. Raymond was a former student of the Ontario Institute for the Blind in Brantford (now The W. Ross Macdonald School), after losing most of his sight on a voyage to the Cape of Good Hope in 1873. He began his attendance at the school immediately after emigrating to Canada in 1873.

In 1890, Raymond became an alderman in Brantford, Ontario and served in that capacity until 1895. In 1898 and 1899 he was mayor of that city.

He was elected to Parliament at the Brantford riding in the 1921 general election. After serving his only federal term, the 14th Canadian Parliament, riding boundaries were changed and Raymond was defeated by Robert Edwy Ryerson of the Conservatives at the new Brantford City riding in the 1925 federal election.
