= Cockshutt =

Cockshutt may refer to:

- Cockshutt, Shropshire, a village and civil parish in England
- The Cockshutt, a local nature reserve in Wrockwardine Wood and Trench, Shropshire, England
- Cockshutt, an area of Highley village, Shropshire, United Kingdom
- Ignatius Cockshutt, Canadian businessman
- Cockshutt Plow Company, a Canadian company
- Henry Cockshutt, Lieutenant-Governor of Ontario and another son of Ignatius
- William Foster Cockshutt, Canadian politician and another son of Ignatius

== See also ==
- Cockshoot or cockshut, a broad opening in a forest
