= Yuile =

Yuile is a surname. Notable people with the surname include:

- Bryan Yuile (born 1941), New Zealand cricketer
- David Yuile (1846–1909), Canadian businessman

== See also ==
- Yule (surname)
