= Cockshott =

Cockshott is a surname. Notable people with the surname include:

- Paul Cockshott (born 1952), British computer scientist and economist
- George Cockshott (1875–1953), British naval architect
- Gerald Cockshott (1915–1979), English composer, librettist, writer, and teacher

== See also ==
- Cockshutt (disambiguation)
