= James Elisha Brown =

Canadian politician

- Official 1968 portrait

Member of Parliament for Brantford
- In office August 1953 – April 1957
- Preceded by: Ross Macdonald
- Succeeded by: Jack Wratten
- In office September 1962 – June 1968
- Preceded by: Jack Wratten
- Succeeded by: Riding dissolved

Member of Parliament for Brant
- In office June 1968 – April 1971
- Preceded by: Riding established
- Succeeded by: Derek Blackburn

Personal details
- Born: 12 May 1913 St. Marys, Ontario, Canada
- Died: 26 January 1974 (aged 60) Brantford, Ontario, Canada
- Party: Liberal
- Spouse: Helen Elizabeth Eedy
- Profession: lawyer

James Elisha Brown (12 May 1913 – 26 January 1974) was a Liberal member of the House of Commons of Canada. Brown was born in St. Marys, Ontario and became a lawyer after graduating from Osgoode Hall Law School in 1941.

He was first elected at the Brantford riding in the 1953 general election and served a term in the 22nd Canadian Parliament.

Brown did not participate in the 1957 election, but returned to Parliament for the Brantford riding in the 1962 election. He was re-elected there for successive terms in the 1963 and 1965 federal elections, then was re-elected at the newly configured Brant riding in the 1968 election. Brown left Parliament before the end of his term in the 28th Canadian Parliament.

In 1963, Brown chaired a Canadian delegation to the United Nations. He also served as Chairman of the World Federalist Movement-Canada in Ottawa. In his community, Brown served as Alderman of the City of Brantford and Chairman of the Brantford and Suburban Planning Board.

In 1955, he placed a motion on the Order Paper in 1955, urging that government consider extending the right to vote to all First Nations Canadians over the age of 21, who were ordinarily resident on a reservation.

In 1967, Brown introduced a private member's bill in the House of Commons, launching a successful campaign to lower the voting age to 18, from 21.

Another private member's bill he sponsored in 1969 advocated changing the name of “Dominion Day” (July 1) to Canada Day.

His widow, Helen Elizabeth (née Eedy), was the sister of writer Alice Boissonneau, and remarried to Northrop Frye after Brown's death.

== Electoral record ==
1968 Canadian federal election: Brant
Party	Candidate	Votes	%
Liberal	James Elisha Brown	16,029	39.8
New Democratic	Derek Blackburn	12,333	30.6
Progressive Conservative	Geoff Styles	11,901	29.6
Total valid votes		40,263	100.0
