= Penmans =

Canadian clothing manufacturer

- Industry: Clothing; Apparel
- Founded: 1868
- Headquarters: Paris, Ontario
- Products: Wool; Cotton

Penmans is a Toronto, Canada-based clothing manufacturer. It was founded as a woolen knitting mill in Paris, Ontario, in 1868. It became one of Canada's largest suppliers of cotton and woolen knit goods, including hosiery and underwear, by the 1890s. In 1906 the company passed under the control of the Dominion Textile group and was renamed Penmans Limited; after the death of its president, David Morrice, in 1914 it was headed by Dominion Textile's president, Charles Blair Gordon.

Once known for underwear, socks, stockings and long johns (which have been discontinued), Penmans now produces sports shirts, sweatpants, sweatshirts, and shorts.

Penmans Apparel Inc. was amalgamated into T.A.G. Apparel Group Inc. on 1988-01-01.

In 1989, Penman Textile Mill in Paris, Ontario was designated as a national historic site by Parks Canada.

Penmans-branded clothing is also sold by Walmart since 2010.
