= Atomic recoil =

Transfer of momentum from an elementary particle to an atom

In nuclear physics, atomic recoil is the result of the interaction of an atom with an energetic elementary particle, when the momentum of the interacting particle is transferred to the atom as a whole without altering non-translational degrees of freedom of the atom. It is a purely quantum phenomenon. Atomic recoil was discovered by Harriet Brooks, Canada's first female nuclear physicist, in 1904, but interpreted wrongly. Otto Hahn and Lise Meitner reworked, explained and demonstrated it in 1908/09. The physicist Walther Gerlach described radioactive recoil as "a profoundly significant discovery in physics with far-reaching consequences".

If the transferred momentum of atomic recoil is enough to disrupt the crystal lattice of the material, a vacancy defect is formed; therefore a phonon is generated.

Closely related to atomic recoil are electron recoil (see photoexcitation and photoionization) and nuclear recoil, in which momentum transfers to the atomic nucleus as whole. Nuclear recoil can cause the nucleus to be displaced from its normal position in the crystal lattice, which can result in the daughter atom being more susceptible to dissolution. This leads for example to an increase in the ratio of ^{234}U to ^{238}U in certain cases, which can be exploited in dating (see Uranium–thorium dating).

In some cases, quantum effects can forbid momentum transfer to an individual nucleus, and momentum is transferred to the crystal lattice as a whole (see Mössbauer effect).

== Mathematical treatment ==
Let us consider an atom or nucleus that emits a particle (a proton, neutron, alpha particle, neutrino, or gamma ray). In the simplest situation, the nucleus recoils with the same momentum, p as the particle has. The total energy of the "daughter" nucleus afterwards is

$$\sqrt{M_d^2c^4+p^2c^2}$$

whereas that of the emitted particle is

$$\sqrt{M_p^2c^4+p^2c^2}$$

where $M_d$ and $M_p$ are the rest masses of the daughter nucleus and the particle respectively. The sum of these must equal the rest energy of the original nucleus:

$$\sqrt{M_p^2c^4+p^2c^2}+\sqrt{M_d^2c^4+p^2c^2}=M_oc^2$$

or

$$\sqrt{M_p^2c^2+p^2}=M_oc-\sqrt{M_d^2c^2+p^2}.$$

Squaring both sides gives:

$$M_p^2c^2+p^2=M_o^2c^2+M_d^2c^2+p^2-2M_oc\sqrt{M_d^2c^2+p^2}$$

or

$$2M_oc\sqrt{M_d^2c^2+p^2}=(M_o^2+M_d^2-M_p^2)c^2.$$

Again squaring both sides gives:

$$4M_o^2c^2(M_d^2c^2+p^2)=(M_o^4+M_d^4+M_p^4+2M_o^2M_d^2-2M_o^2M_p^2-2M_d^2M_p^2)c^4$$

or

$$p^2=\frac{M_o^4+M_d^4+M_p^4-2M_o^2M_d^2-2M_o^2M_p^2-2M_d^2M_p^2}{4M_o^2}c^2$$

or

$$p^2=\frac{(M_o-M_d-M_p)(M_o+M_d-M_p)(M_o-M_d+M_p)(M_o+M_d+M_p)}{4M_o^2}c^2.$$

Note that $(M_o-M_d-M_p)c^2$ is the energy released by the decay, which we may designate $E_{decay}$.

For the total energy of the particle we have:

$$\begin{align}
\sqrt{M_p^2c^4+p^2c^2}&=\sqrt{\frac{M_o^4+M_d^4+M_p^4-2M_o^2M_d^2+2M_o^2M_p^2-2M_d^2M_p^2}{4M_o^2}c^4}\\
&=\frac{M_o^2-M_d^2+M_p^2}{2M_o}c^2\\
&=M_pc^2+\frac{M_o^2-2M_oM_p+M_p^2-M_d^2}{2M_o}c^2\\
&=M_pc^2+\frac{(M_o-M_p)^2-M_d^2}{2M_o}c^2\\
&=M_pc^2+\frac 12\left(\frac{M_o-M_p}{M_o}+\frac{M_d}{M_o}\right)(M_o-M_d-M_p)c^2
\end{align}$$

So the kinetic energy imparted to the particle is:

$$\frac 12\left(\frac{M_o-M_p}{M_o}+\frac{M_d}{M_o}\right)E_{decay}$$

Similarly, the kinetic energy imparted to the daughter nucleus is:

$$\frac 12\left(\frac{M_o-M_d}{M_o}+\frac{M_p}{M_o}\right)E_{decay}$$

When the emitted particle is a proton, neutron, or alpha particle the fraction of the decay energy going to the particle is approximately $M_d/M_o$ and the fraction going to the daughter nucleus $M_p/M_o.$ For neutrinos and gamma rays, the departing particle gets almost all the energy, the fraction going to the daughter nucleus being only $E_{decay}/(2M_oc^2).$

The speed of the emitted particle is given by $pc^2$ divided by the total energy:

$$v_p=\frac{\sqrt{(M_o-M_d-M_p)(M_o+M_d-M_p)(M_o-M_d+M_p)(M_o+M_d+M_p)}}{M_o^2-M_d^2+M_p^2}c$$

Similarly, the speed of the recoiling nucleus is:

$$v_d=\frac{\sqrt{(M_o-M_d-M_p)(M_o+M_d-M_p)(M_o-M_d+M_p)(M_o+M_d+M_p)}}{M_o^2+M_d^2-M_p^2}c$$

If we take $M_p=0$ for neutrinos and gamma rays, this simplifies to:

$$\begin{align}
v_d&=\frac{M_o^2-M_d^2}{M_o^2+M_d^2}c\\
&=\frac{M_o+M_d}{M_o^2+M_d^2}\frac{E_{decay}}c\\
&\approx\frac 2{M_o+M_d}\frac{E_{decay}}c
\end{align}$$

For similar decay energies, the recoil from emitting an alpha ray will be much greater than the recoil from emitting a neutrino (upon electron capture) or a gamma ray.

For decays that produce two particles as well as the daughter nuclide, the above formulas can be used to find the maximum energy, momentum, or speed of any of the three, by assuming that the lighter of the other two ends up with a speed of zero. For example, the maximum energy of the neutrino, if we assume its rest mass to be zero, is found by using the formula as though only the daughter and the neutrino are involved:

$$\frac 12\left(1+\frac{M_d}{M_o-M_e}\right)E_{decay}$$

Note that $M_d$ here is not the mass of the neutral daughter isotope, but that minus the electron mass: $M_d=M_o-E_{decay}/c^2-M_e.$

With beta decay, the maximum recoil energy of the daughter nuclide, as a fraction of the decay energy, is greater than either of the approximations given above, $M_e/M_o.$ and $E_{decay}/(2M_oc^2).$ The first ignores the decay energy, and the second ignores the mass of the beta particle, but with beta decay these two are often comparable and neither can be ignored (see Beta decay#Energy release).

== See also ==
- Recoilless nuclear resonance fluorescence

== Bibliography ==
- Gerlach, Walther; Hahn, Dietrich (1984). Otto Hahn – Ein Forscherleben unserer Zeit (in German). Stuttgart: Wissenschaftliche Verlagsgesellschaft (WVG). ISBN 978-3-8047-0757-3. OCLC 473315990.
- Hahn, Otto (1966). Otto Hahn: A Scientific Autobiography. Translated by Ley, Willy. New York: Charles Scribner's Sons. LCCN 66-25149. OCLC 646422716.
