= William Ross Macdonald =

Canadian politician (1891-1976)

The Honourable William Ross Macdonald PC OC CD QC
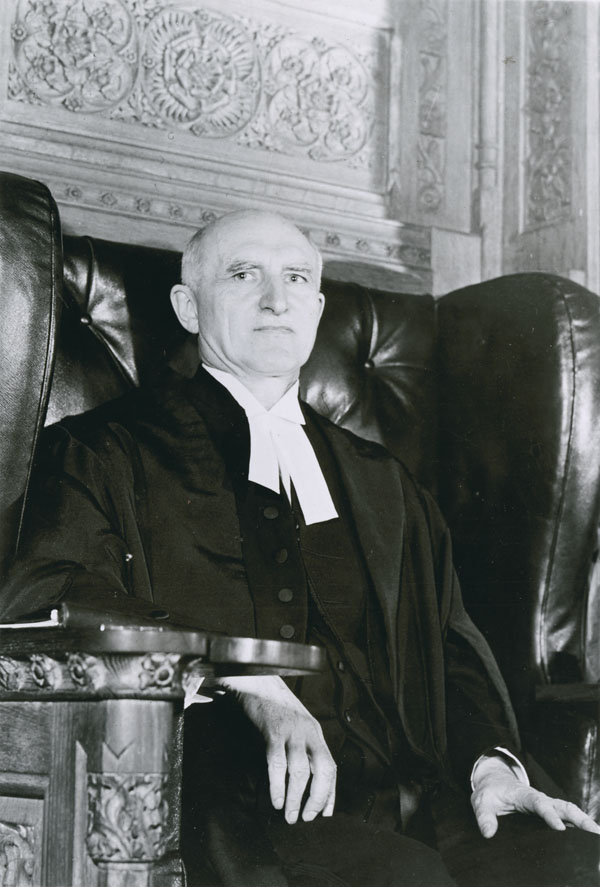
- Macdonald in the Speaker's Chair of the Canadian House of Commons

21st Lieutenant Governor of Ontario
- In office July 4, 1968 – April 10, 1974
- Monarch: Elizabeth II
- Governors General: Roland Michener; Jules Léger
- Premier: John Robarts; Bill Davis
- Preceded by: William Earl Rowe
- Succeeded by: Pauline Mills McGibbon

Leader of the Government in the Senate
- In office April 22, 1963 – February 2, 1964
- Prime Minister: Lester B. Pearson
- Preceded by: Alfred Johnson Brooks
- Succeeded by: John Joseph Connolly
- In office October 14, 1953 – June 20, 1957
- Prime Minister: Louis St. Laurent
- Preceded by: Wishart McLea Robertson
- Succeeded by: John Thomas Haig

Leader of the Opposition in the Senate
- In office June 20, 1957 – April 22, 1963
- Preceded by: John Thomas Haig
- Succeeded by: Alfred Johnson Brooks

18th Solicitor General of Canada
- In office January 12, 1954 – June 20, 1957
- Prime Minister: Louis St. Laurent
- Preceded by: Ralph Campney
- Succeeded by: Léon Balcer

Canadian Senator from Ontario
- In office June 12, 1953 – December 22, 1967
- Appointed by: Louis St. Laurent

22nd Speaker of the House of Commons of Canada
- In office September 15, 1949 – June 11, 1953
- Preceded by: Gaspard Fauteux
- Succeeded by: Louis-René Beaudoin

Member of Parliament for Brantford
- In office October 14, 1935 – June 27, 1949
- Preceded by: Robert Edwy Ryerson
- Succeeded by: Constituency abolished

Member of Parliament for Brantford City
- In office June 27, 1949 – August 10, 1953
- Preceded by: Constituency established
- Succeeded by: James Elisha Brown

Personal details
- Born: December 25, 1891 Toronto, Ontario, Canada
- Died: May 28, 1976 (aged 84) Toronto, Ontario, Canada
- Resting place: Farringdon Burial Ground, Brantford
- Party: Liberal
- Education: University of Toronto; Osgoode Hall Law School
- Profession: Lawyer

Military service
- Branch/service: Canadian Expeditionary Force
- Rank: Lieutenant
- Unit: 4th Battalion; 2nd Cycle Corps
- Battles/wars: First World War

William Ross Macdonald PC OC CD QC (December 25, 1891 – May 28, 1976), served as the 21st Lieutenant Governor of Ontario from 1968 to 1974, and as 22nd Speaker of the House of Commons of Canada from 1949 to 1953.

== Early life ==
Macdonald was born in Toronto, Ontario, to a dry goods merchant who had immigrated from Scotland. He went on to study law at the University of Toronto and the Osgoode Hall Law School. Upon completion, he practised law in Brantford, Ontario, and served with the 2nd Canadian Division Cyclist Company and 4th Battalion of the Canadian Expeditionary Force in the First World War.

In 1921, Macdonald married Muriel Whittaker.

== Political career ==
Macdonald sought Liberal Party nomination to run for election to the House of Commons of Canada for the 1926 election, but lost the nomination by a single vote. He won the nomination for the Brantford riding in the next election, but lost the election. Macdonald was elected in the 1935 election. He served as Member of Parliament (MP) until 1953.

During World War II, Macdonald was a staunch supporter of conscription. His position is made clear in this wartime quote taken from a Canadian newspaper, "There is a victory to be won and that can be accomplished only by every Canadian taking part." After the war, he served as Deputy Speaker (1945–1949) and then as Speaker of the House of Commons (1949–1953).

While serving as Speaker of the House of Commons Macdonald made a famous ruling, banning musical instruments from being played in the Chamber, on June 3, 1950. The ban came about after Daniel McIvor MP for Fort William played a flute while waiting for a vote call.

In 1953, Governor General Vincent Massey, on the advice of Prime Minister Louis St. Laurent, appointed Macdonald to the Senate of Canada, where he became Leader of the Government in the Canadian Senate and a minister without portfolio in the Canadian Cabinet. From 1954 until the Liberal government's defeat in the 1957 election, Macdonald served as Solicitor General of Canada.

With the defeat of the Liberals, he became Leader of the Opposition in the Canadian Senate, and served again as Government Leader when the Liberals returned to power in 1963. He retired from the Cabinet in 1964. From 1964 to 1972, he was the second Chancellor of Waterloo Lutheran University.

Governor General Roland Michener, on the advice of Lester Pearson, appointed Macdonald to serve as Lieutenant Governor from 1968 to 1974. In this role, he was involved with many service groups, such as the Canadian Order of Foresters and the Kiwanis Club.

In 1974, he was made an Officer of the Order of Canada. The Ontario School for the Blind in Brantford was renamed the W. Ross Macdonald School in his honour.

He died in Toronto in 1976.

== Freemasonry ==
William Macdonald was a devoted Freemason initiated on March 17, 1917 at the Doric Lodge No. 121 in Brantford, Ontario.

Political offices
Preceded by Ralph Osborne Campney	Solicitor General of Canada; 1954–1957	Succeeded by Léon Balcer
Government offices
Preceded by William Earl Rowe	Lieutenant Governor of Ontario; 1968–1974	Succeeded by Pauline Mills McGibbon
Preceded by Wishart McLea Robertson	Leader of the Government in the Senate of Canada; 1953–1957	Succeeded by John Thomas Haig
Preceded by John Thomas Haig	Leader of the Opposition in the Senate of Canada; 1957–1963	Succeeded by Alfred Johnson Brooks
Preceded by Alfred Johnson Brooks	Leader of the Government in the Senate of Canada; 1963–1964	Succeeded by John Joseph Connolly
Academic offices
Preceded by William Daum Euler	Chancellor of Waterloo Lutheran University; 1964–1972	Succeeded by Paul Joseph Martin
