= Brantford (federal electoral district) =

Former federal electoral district in Ontario, Canada

Ontario electoral district

Defunct federal electoral district
- Legislature: House of Commons
- District created: 1903, 1947
- District abolished: 1924, 1966
- First contested: 1904
- Last contested: 1965

Brantford was a federal electoral district in Ontario, Canada, that was represented in the House of Commons of Canada from 1904 to 1925 and from 1949 to 1968.

The riding was first created in 1903 from parts of Brant South riding. It consisted initially of the city of Brantford, the township of Oakland, and the part of the township of Brantford south and west of the Grand River. The electoral district was abolished in 1924 when it was merged into Brantford City riding.

It was recreated in 1947 from parts of Brant and Brantford City ridings. The second incarnation consisted initially of the city of Brantford, the townships of Burford and Oakland and the part of the township of Brantford lying south and west of the left bank of Grand River, in the county of Brant. In 1952, it was redefined to include a part of the township of Brantford lying to the east of the city Brantford.

The electoral district was abolished in 1966 when it was merged into Brant riding.

== Members of Parliament ==
This riding elected the following members of Parliament:

Parliament	Years	Member	Party
Riding created from Brant South
10th	1904–1908	William Foster Cockshutt	Conservative
11th	1908–1911	Lloyd Harris	Liberal
12th	1911–1917	William Foster Cockshutt	Conservative
13th	1917–1921	William Foster Cockshutt	Government (Unionist)
14th	1921–1925	William Gawtress Raymond	Liberal
Riding dissolved into Brantford City
Riding re-created from Brant and Brantford City
21st	1949–1953	William Ross Macdonald	Liberal
22nd	1953–1957	James Elisha Brown	Liberal
23rd	1957–1958	Jack Wratten	Progressive Conservative
24th	1958–1962	Jack Wratten	Progressive Conservative
25th	1962–1963	James Elisha Brown	Liberal
26th	1963–1965	James Elisha Brown	Liberal
27th	1965–1968	James Elisha Brown	Liberal
Riding dissolved into Brant

== Election results ==
=== 1904–1921 ===
1904 Canadian federal election
Party	Candidate	Votes
Conservative	William Foster Cockshutt	2,383
Liberal	Charles Bernard Heyd	2,368

1908 Canadian federal election
Party	Candidate	Votes
Liberal	Lloyd Harris	2,832
Conservative	William Foster Cockshutt	2,627

1911 Canadian federal election
Party	Candidate	Votes
Conservative	William Foster Cockshutt	3,159
Liberal	Thomas Hiram Preston	2,440

1917 Canadian federal election
Party	Candidate	Votes
Government (Unionist)	William Foster Cockshutt	5,925
Opposition (Laurier Liberals)	John Wedgewood Bowlby	2,233
Labour	Morrisson Mann MacBride	1,726

1921 Canadian federal election
Party	Candidate	Votes
Liberal	William Gawtress Raymond	6,879
Conservative	William Foster Cockshutt	4,892
Progressive	Arthur William Burt	1,244

=== 1949–1965 ===
1949 Canadian federal election
Party	Candidate	Votes
Liberal	William Ross Macdonald	12,565
Progressive Conservative	John Tozeland Shillington	6,747
Co-operative Commonwealth	Reginald Cooper	4,160

1953 Canadian federal election
Party	Candidate	Votes
Liberal	James Elisha Brown	9,576
Progressive Conservative	John Tozeland Shillington	7,912
Co-operative Commonwealth	John Houison Gillies	3,839
Labor–Progressive	Dorise Nielsen	216

1957 Canadian federal election
Party	Candidate	Votes
Progressive Conservative	Jack Wratten	9,902
Liberal	W. John McCormack	8,095
Co-operative Commonwealth	Margaret McLellan	5,927

1958 Canadian federal election
Party	Candidate	Votes
Progressive Conservative	Jack Wratten	14,059
Liberal	James Gray Leslie	7,694
Co-operative Commonwealth	John Maycock	3,726

1962 Canadian federal election
Party	Candidate	Votes
Liberal	James Elisha Brown	11,475
Progressive Conservative	Jack Wratten	8,549
New Democratic	Robert G. Good	4,085
Social Credit	Geoffrey E. W. Styles	1,193

1963 Canadian federal election
Party	Candidate	Votes
Liberal	James Elisha Brown	10,804
Progressive Conservative	Andy Andreasen	9,680
New Democratic	Bill Humble	3,706
Social Credit	Herb Motz	766

1965 Canadian federal election
Party	Candidate	Votes
Liberal	James Elisha Brown	9,948
Progressive Conservative	Ken Hodge	7,825
New Democratic	Mac Makarchuk	6,176
Social Credit	Paul Seddon	208

== See also ==
- List of Canadian electoral districts
- Historical federal electoral districts of Canada
