= Alice Boissonneau =

Canadian writer (1918 - 2007)

Alice Irene Boissonneau, née Eedy (1918 - 2007) was a Canadian writer and social worker. She was most noted for her 1976 novel Eileen McCullough, which was a shortlisted finalist for the Books in Canada First Novel Award in 1977.

== Background ==
Born in Walkerton, Ontario, and raised in St. Mary's, Ontario, she was the daughter of Lorne Eedy, a publisher of the St. Mary's Journal-Argus. Her older sister, Helen Elizabeth Eedy, was the wife of politician James Elisha Brown, and later remarried to Northrop Frye in 1988 after Brown's death.

She was educated at the University of Toronto's Victoria College, and began her career as a hospital social worker in Toronto, also serving on Toronto's municipal housing committee in the 1940s.

== Career ==
After marrying forestry worker Arthur Boissonneau, she took up writing, with her short stories and poetry appearing in various Canadian literary magazines, and radio dramas broadcast by CBC Radio, prior to the publication of Eileen McCullogh in 1976. The novel's titular character was a young woman in Toronto in the World War II era who found herself a single mother after a brief affair with a soldier and was forced to take low-paying working class jobs to support herself and her child.

She published There Will Be Gardens, a memoir of her time in Toronto in the 1940s, in 1992, and followed up with her second and final novel, A Sudden Brightness, in 1994.

In late life she lived in Guelph, Ontario, where she died in 2007. Following her death, her neighbour Marlene Santin established a charitable program, Pets for Alice, in her memory to help cover the costs of pet adoption and care for senior citizens.
