= Dominion Textile =

Canadian textile manufacturer (1905–1997)

- Industry: Textile industry
- Predecessor: Montmorency Cotton Mills
- Founded: 4 January 1905
- Defunct: 29 December 1997
- Fate: Acquired by Polymer Group
- Headquarters: 1950, rue Sherbrooke, Montreal, Quebec
- Brands: Truprest; Texmade
- Divisions: Wayn-Tex; Dominion Fabrics Co.
- Subsidiaries: Swift Textiles; Dominion Yarn; Dominion Specialty Yarns; Dominion Cotton Services; Poly-Bond Inc.; Dominion Industrial Fabrics

The Dominion Textile Company, Limited, known commonly as Domtex, was a Canadian textile manufacturer that was founded in 1905 and closed in 1998 when its remains were purchased by the American Polymer Group, at the time headed by Jerry Zucker.

== History ==
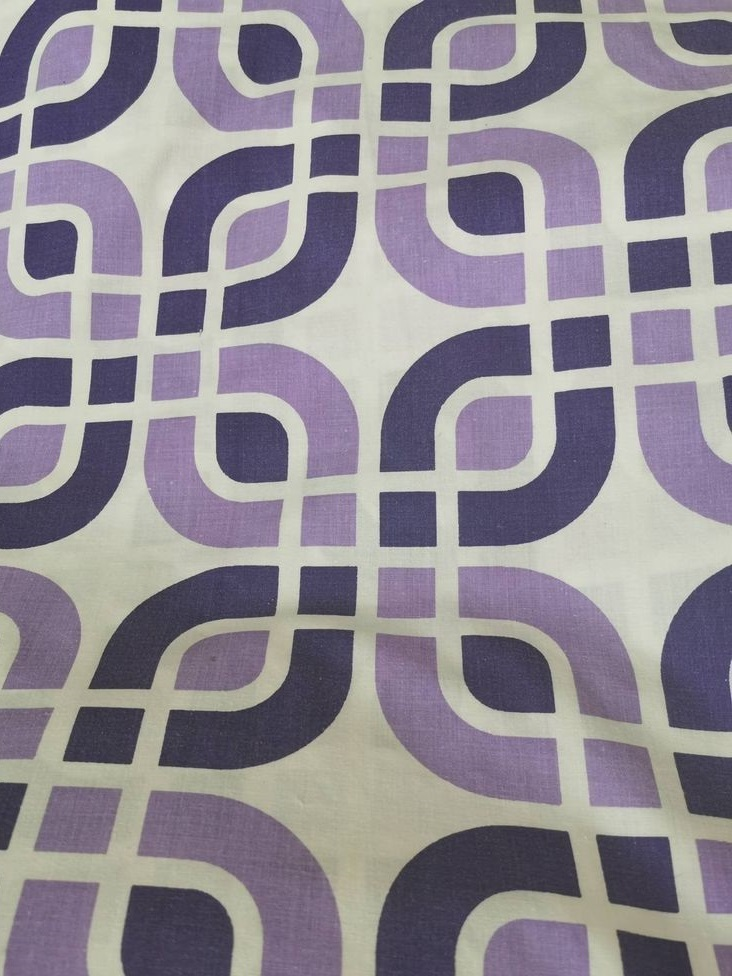
Purple variation of Dominion Textile's 1970's "Labyrinth" Texmade Truprest line

Following the instituting of the National Policy in 1879, Canadian manufacturers gained a degree of insulation from global markets, leading to a rapid increase in the number of cotton mills. Overproduction soon ensued, which created problems for the industry. Toward the turn of the century, it became increasingly consolidated and dominated by trusts and cartels. In 1905, four of the largest textile companies in Canada, which between them owned over half the looms and spindles in the country, merged to form Dominion Textile, which soon gained a near monopoly in the tariff-protected Canadian market. Based in Montreal, it was one of Canada's leading companies and had close links to the government. Most of the company's production was based in small towns in Quebec and elsewhere across Canada; in most of these towns, the mill was the primary employer. Dominion Textile and its affiliate, Montreal Cottons, used the Slater, or family method of recruitment, which involved sending agents into the rural Quebec countryside to encourage entire families to move to mill towns. This was successful because of Quebec's large population of surplus labour relative to its arable land. In general, the Quebec cotton industry had employed children since the 1880s, but legislation and a large working population resulted in a slow shift toward greater predominance of adults by the 20th century, many of whom were unmarried women. A concentration of textile mill workers were young women aged around sixteen to eighteen, who lived with their parents, often also mill workers, and who formed a significant part of the family as an economic unit. These women were concentrated heavily in lighter, semi-skilled work, with little upward mobility.

Canada's textile industry suffered considerably during the Great Depression, resulting in layoffs and shifting the balance of employees for the first time to a majority of men. This was abruptly reversed during the Second World War, with production rising and women taking on new roles within the mills. Amidst labour market instability and the postwar Canadian strike wave (which also saw a major strike at Ford in Windsor, Ontario), there was a strike in June 1946 by the United Textile Workers of America (UTWA) at the Montreal Cottons plant in Valleyfield, Quebec as well as four Dominion Textile mills in Montreal. While the latter strikes were settled by August, the former continued on bitterly until September, and became notable for its rioting.

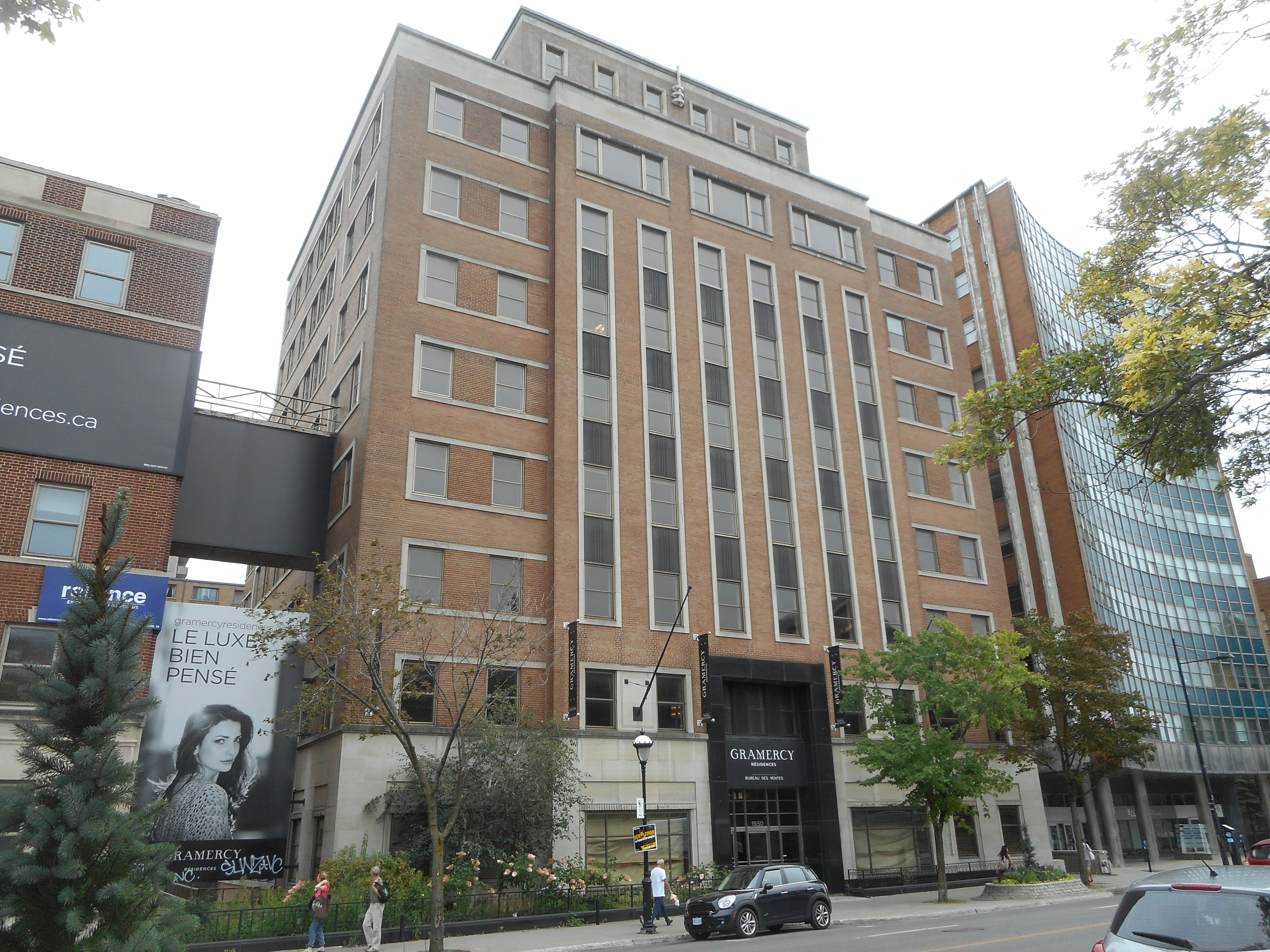
The company's 1953 head office at 1950 rue Sherbrooke, designed by H. Ross Wiggs.

In 1948 the economic situation changed dramatically as tariffs between western nations were greatly reduced, and Dominion Textile was exposed to strong competition from the United States and Britain. Dominion Textiles' market share fell dramatically from nearly 100% of the Canadian market in 1947 to only 47% a decade later. The company almost collapsed, but eventually adapted to the new conditions. It was rebranded as Domtex and moved into new areas such as the production of polyester. In the same period it became seen by Quebec nationalists as a prime example of the anglophone businesses that controlled the province. In 1967 FLQ member Jean Corbo died when a bomb detonated prematurely in an attempted attack on a Dominion Textile plant in Montreal.

In the 1970s the company began to expand abroad, seeking to compete outside Canada. It purchased smaller companies in other nations and built new factories. At its peak in the 1980s it had 14,000 employees and factories in Canada, the United States, Ireland, France, Italy and Tunisia. A leader in a number of areas, it became the world's largest producer of denim.

In the 1980s the textile industry was again changing, as General Agreement on Tariffs and Trade (GATT) provisions came into effect that opened the business to competition from low wage developing economies. Domtex tried to adapt. It entered into a long battle to try to get concessions from its unions and closed half its Canadian factories. In 1987 it made a failed bid for American giant Burlington Industries, that would have made it a global textile leader. Over the course of the 1990s the company slowly collapsed, and by 1997 it was left with only two factories. The remnants were bought for some $600 million by the Polymer Group of South Carolina in 1998.

Many of its products were once household names in Canada, such as the Texmade bedding line, Caldwell towels, and Penman's underwear.

== Leadership ==
=== President ===
1. David Yuile, 1905–1909
2. Sir Charles Blair Gordon, 1909–1928
3. Francis Galvin Daniels, 1928–1933
4. Sir Charles Blair Gordon, 1933–1939
5. George Blair Gordon, 1939–1961
6. Francis Ryland Daniels, 1961–1966
7. Edward Francis King, 1966–1969
8. Ronald Herbert Perowne, 1969–1974
9. Thomas Reid Bell, 1974–1989
10. Charles Harold Hantho, 1989–1995
11. John Allen Boland III, 1995–1997

== Archives ==
There is a Dominion Textile fonds at Library and Archives Canada. It contains around 94 m of textual records, 45,000 photographs and 500 architectural drawings. Archival reference number is R1351.
