= Ply Gem =

- Type: Public
- Industry: Building materials
- Founded: 1943
- Headquarters: Cary, North Carolina, United States
- Area served: North America
- Products: Windows, doors, siding, stone veneer, fencing, trim and mouldings, roofing products
- Parent: Cornerstone Building Brands
- Website: www.plygem.com

Ply Gem is a North American building products manufacturer. It produces a range of exterior building materials.

== History ==
Ply Gem was founded in 1943.

In 2014, Ply Gem acquired Simonton Windows from Fortune Brands.

In July 2018, Ply Gem Parent, LLC merged with NCI Building Systems, Inc., creating Cornerstone Building Brands, a large exterior building products company serving both residential and commercial markets. Following the combined company's formation, the Ply Gem brand continued as part of the Cornerstone Building Brands portfolio.

In 2021, Ply Gem, introduced The Home Design Visualizer, that allows users to virtually modify their own home or sample images, using curated color and material combinations.

== Products ==
Ply Gem's product line includes a variety of exterior building materials such as vinyl and aluminum siding and accessories, windows and patio doors, stone veneer, fencing and railing systems, and cellular PVC trim and mouldings. Its products are marketed to homeowners, builders, remodelers, architects, and trade professionals in North America.

== See also ==
- Building material
- Cornerstone Building Brands
