= Merchant M. Mahoney =

Merchant M. Mahoney, CBE (died May 4, 1946) was a Canadian diplomat who served as Canada's unofficial representative to the United States and High Commissioner to Ireland.

Born in New York State of Canadian parents, Mahoney went to the United States in 1916 with the Imperial Munitions Board, transferring to the Canadian War Mission two years later, where from November 1918 he served under its acting chairman, Sir Charles Gordon. When the War Mission was wound down in 1921, Mahoney was appointed Canada's agent to the United States of America, pending further arrangements. As agent, he was provided with an office within the British Embassy in Washington D. C., but had no official status. In 1927, when the Canadian Legation was established, Mahoney was appointed Commercial Secretary. He was appointed a CBE in 1935.

Mahoney was appointed Canada's High Commissioner to Éire (Ireland) in 1945, but died a year later in Dublin.
