= Canadian Manufacturers & Exporters =

Canadian trade association

- Formerly: Ontario Manufacturers’ Association (1871–77); Canadian Manufacturers’ Association (1877–1999)
- Founded: 1871 (founded); 15 May 1901 (incorporated)
- Headquarters: 393 University Avenue, Toronto, Ontario
- Website: cme-mec.ca

The Alliance of Manufacturers & Exporters Canada, operating as Canadian Manufacturers & Exporters, is a Canadian trade association that has existed since 1871. The organisation was founded as the Ontario Manufacturers' Association and in 1877 changed its name to the Canadian Manufacturers' Association.

In 1996, the CMA absorbed the Canadian Exporters Association, and in 1999 changed its legal name to the Alliance of Manufacturers & Exporters Canada. Since 2000, it has operated as Canadian Manufacturers & Exporters.

== History ==
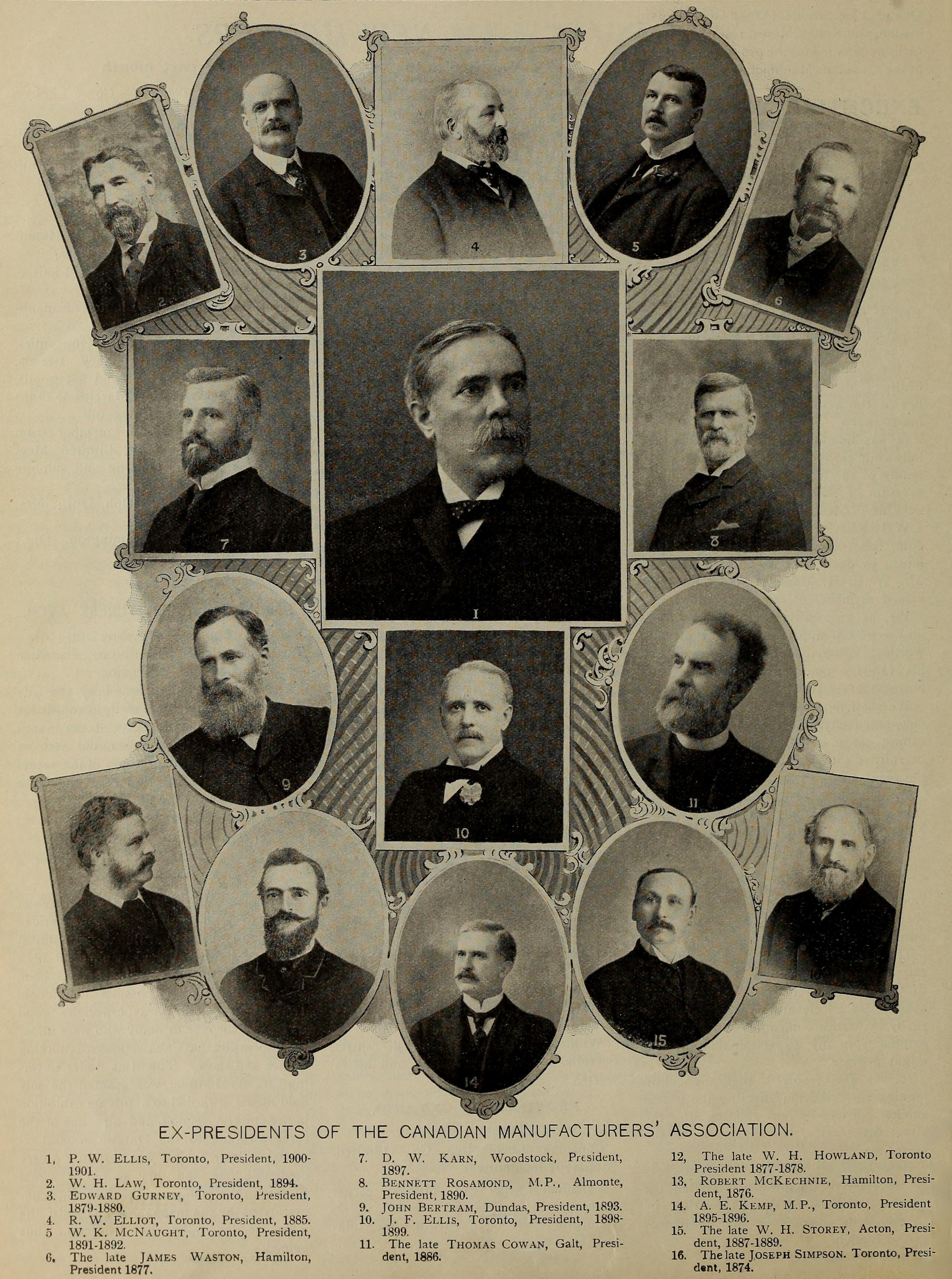
Composite of past presidents of the CMA from 1874 to 1901

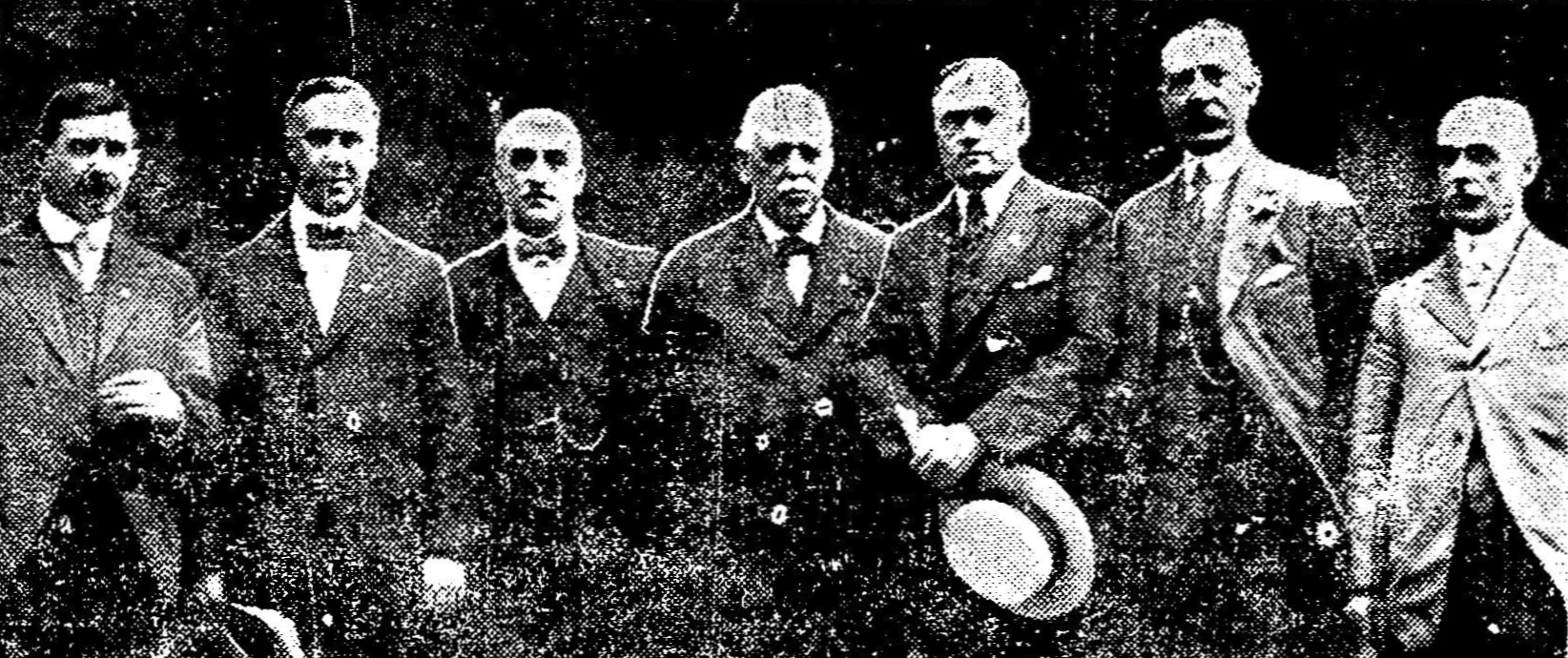
The executive elected at the June 1919 annual meeting, showing several past presidents. From left to right: W. J. Bulman (outgoing president), J. S. McKinnon (first vice-president), T. P. Howard (president), J. F. Ellis (treasurer), J. E. Walsh (manager), W. S. Fisher (second vice-president), H. Macdonald (secretary).

In December 1918, the Association created a new office of General Manager. The post, which was filled by James Edward Walsh (1861–1947), was created to broaden the scope of the association's activities and execute its mission. Walsh had worked for the CMA since 1907 in its traffic department. Concurrently, the association's general secretary, G. M. Murray, was sent to Ottawa to carry out work in the capital.

In 1939, Walsh was succeeded as general manager by John Thomas Stirrett (1883–1958). Stirrett was a 1908 graduate of the University of Toronto, and upon graduation began his career as a reporter. In 1912, he was hired by the CMA as editor of Industrial Canada, then in 1914 left fight in the war, where he reached the rank of major. Stirrett returned to the CMA in 1919 as general secretary. In November 1918 he was made assistant general manager. Upon Stirrett's accession, Walsh took the title of assistant to the president, which he held until his death in 1947.

On 29 May 1953, Stirrett announced his retirement. He was succeeded as general manager by George Kingsley Sheils (1894–1953), who was the immediate past president. Sheils had had a distinguished career in industry and during World War II had served as director of administration for the War Supply Board, and as deputy minister for the Department of Munitions and Supply. After just under six months in office, Sheils died at his home in Toronto at age 59. He was succeeded by John Coghlan Whitelaw QC (1907–1997), a lawyer from Montreal. Whitelaw had joined the CMA in 1940 as manager of the Quebec division. On 1 November 1953 he had moved to Toronto to become assistant general manager of the national organisation.

On 1 July 1972, Whitelaw was succeeded as general manager by William Dean Howells Frechette (1917–2009). Frechette was the son of writers Achille Fréchette and Annie Howells, and on his mother's side was the nephew of American author William Dean Howells. Frechette had begun his career in 1939 with the Hudson's Bay Company, and in World War II served in the Royal Canadian Ordnance Corps, attaining the rank of lieutenant colonel. He joined the CMA in 1946.

In late 1974, Frechette took the position of executive vice-president and secretary, leaving open the office of general manager. The GM position was filled temporarily by president Keith Hartley Rapsey. On 1 July 1975, Roy Alexander Phillips (1918–2012) was hired as the new general manager, which became known as executive director. Phillips was from Vancouver and graduated in engineering from the University of British Columbia in 1939. During the war he served to the rank of major in the artillery. After the war he built a successful career in electronics, and from 1967 to 1975 was a vice-president of RCA Limited, the Canadian division of RCA Corporation.

In February 1981, the CMA made an organisational restructuring. Accordingly, the office of president was changed to a chairmanship, while the executive director (general manager) was changed to a presidency.

== Leadership ==
=== President (to 1981) and Chairman (from 1981) ===
From its inception, the ranking officer of the CME was its President, elected annually. In 1981, the office was changed to that of the Chairman, while the former Executive Director became the President.

- 1874 – Joseph Simpson
- 1876 – Robert McKechnie
- 1877 – James Waston
- 1877 – William Holmes Howland
- 1879 – Edward Gurney
- 1885 – R. W. Elliott
- 1886 – Thomas Cowan
- 1887 – William Heslop Storey
- 1890 – Bennett Rosamond
- 1891 – William Kirkpatrick McNaught CMG
- 1893 – John Bertram
- 1894 – W. H. Law
- 1895 – Hon. Sir Albert Edward Kemp PC KCMG
- 1897 – Dennis Weston Karn
- 1898 – John Fitzallen Ellis
- 1900 – Philip William Ellis
- 1901 – Robert Munro
- 1902 – Cyrus Albert Birge
- 1903 – George Edward Drummond
- 1904 – William Kerr George
- 1905 – Charles Colquhoun Ballantyne PC
- 1906 – Hon. Henry Cockshutt
- 1907 – Jean-Damien Rolland
- 1908 – Robert Hobson
- 1909 – John Hendry
- 1910 – William Horsley Rowley
- 1911 – Nathaniel Curry
- 1912 – Robert Sloan Gourlay
- 1913 – Sir Charles Blair Gordon GBE
- 1914 – Ernest George Henderson
- 1915 – James Henry Sherrard
- 1916 – Hon. Col. Thomas Cantley
- 1917 – Silas Richard Parsons
- 1918 – William John Bulman
- 1919 – Thomas Palmer Howard
- 1920 – John Sylvester McKinnon
- 1921 – William Shives Fisher
- 1922 – John Ross Shaw
- 1923 – Charles Howard Futvoye Smith
- 1924 – Lt-Col Arthur Frederick Hatch
- 1925 – Joseph-Herman Fortier
- 1926 – John McPherson Taylor
- 1927 – William Smith Fallis
- 1928 – Lewis Wesley Simms
- 1929 – Robert John Hutchings
- 1930 – Elmer Davis
- 1931 – William Harlow Miner
- 1932 – William Charles Coulter
- 1933 – Lawrence Lee Anthes
- 1934 – James H. Webb
- 1935 – Wilson Saunders Morden KC
- 1936 – Bernard William Palin Coghlin
- 1937 – Capt. Frank Currie Brown
- 1938 – William Duncan Black
- 1939 – David Rowan Turnbull
- 1940, 1941 – Harold Crabtree
- 1942 – Louis Lacourse Lang
- 1943 – Frederick Penton Loftus Lane
- 1944 – John Calvin Macfarlane KC
- 1945 – George Blair Gordon
- 1946 – Lt-Col Henry Seymour Tobin DSO VD
- 1947 – Capt. Richard Coulton Berkinshaw CBE
- 1948 – Norman Arthur Hesler
- 1949 – Melville Austin East
- 1950 – William Frederick Holding
- 1951 – Hugh Arthur Crombie
- 1952 – Capt. George Kingsley Sheils CMG
- 1953 – Joseph Douglas Ferguson
- 1954 – Brig. James Allan Calder ED
- 1955 – Thomas Alexander Rice
- 1956 – John Noel Thompson Bulman
- 1957 – Harold Victor Lush
- 1958 – Ian Forbes McRae
- 1959 – William Harold Evans
- 1960 – Thomas Rodgie McLagan
- 1961 – Fred Desbrisay Mathers
- 1962 – Carl Arthur Pollock
- 1963 – Harold Roy Crabtree
- 1964 – Alison Archibal Cumming
- 1965 – Humphrey Bloomfield Style
- 1966 – Henri William Joli
- 1967 – Raymond A. Engholm
- 1968 – John Roche O'Dea
- 1969 – Leonard Francis Wills
- 1970 – Alfred George Sinclair
- 1971 – Gérard Filion
- 1972 – John Daniel Sprague
- 1973 – Keith Hartley Rapsey
- 1974 – Walter Reynolds Lawson
- 1975 – Harold Cauldwell Corrigan
- 1976 – Rodrigue Bilodeau
- 1977 – John Hugh Stevens
- 1978 – James Taylor Kennedy
- 1979 – William John Antliff Bulman
- 1980 – John Edward Malcolm Newall

Title changes to Chairman in February 1981

- 1981 – Jean-Jacques Gagnon
- 1982 – William Brenton Boggs IV OBE
- 1983 – Vernal Cameron German
- 1984 – James Thompson Black
- 1985 – Guy Saint-Pierre
- 1986 – Paul Joseph Phoenix
- 1987 – Charles Harold Hantho
- 1988 – Raymond R. Pinard
- 1989 – David Vice
- 1990 – Paul Summers
- 1991 – Jack L. MacMillan
- 1992 – Peter Green
- 1993 – Ronald Morrison
- 1994 – Gary Graham
- 1995 – Lorne D. Janes
- 1996 – George Jones
- 1997, 1998 – William J. McClean
- 1999, 2000 – Alan R. Curleigh
- 2001 – Benjamin Lorne Hume
- 2002 –
- 2003 –
- 2004 – Stephen Stultz
- 2005 –
- 2006 –
- 2007 – Larry Barrett
- 2008 – David T. Fung
- 2009 –
- 2010 –
- 2011 –
- 2012 –
- 2013, 2014, 2015 – Robert Hattin
- 2016, 2017, 2018 – Rhonda Barnet
- 2019, 2020 – Dave McHattie
- 2021, 2022 – Elise Maheu
- 2023, 2024 – Patrick Oland
- 2025, 2026 – Peter MacDonald

=== General Manager (to 1981) and President (from 1981) ===
The office of General Manager was created in December 1918 for James Edward Walsh, and was intended to support the expanding operations of the Association. In February 1981, the office was change to that of President, while the former president became the Chairman.

1. James Edward Walsh, 20 December 1918 – October 1939
2. Maj. John Thomas Stirrett, October 1939 – 29 May 1953
3. Capt. George Kingsley Sheils CMG, 29 May 1953 – 22 November 1953 †
4. John Coghlan Whitelaw QC, 2 December 1953 – 1 July 1972
5. Lt-Col William Dean Howells Frechette, 1 July 1972 – December 1974
6. Maj. Roy Alexander Phillips, 1 July 1975 – 31 December 1984
  Title changes to President in February 1981
7. J. Laurent Thibault, 1 January 1985 – 11 February 1991
8. Stephen Harris James Van Houten, 8 July 1991 – December 1998
9. Hon. Henry Perrin Beatty PC, 15 August 1999 – 12 August 2007
10. Jayson Myers, 4 September 2007 – 2016
11. Dennis Darby, 30 January 2017 – present

== Bibliography ==
- Canadian Manufacturers' Association. The First 100 Years. The Canadian Manufacturers' Association, 1971.
- Canadian Manufacturers' Association. Official Souvenir: Visit of the Canadian Manufacturers' Association to Great Britain. R. G. McLean, 1905.
- Clark, Samuel Delbert. "The Canadian Manufacturers’ Association." The Canadian Journal of Economics and Political Science vol. 4, no. 4 (1938): 505–23.
- Clark, Samuel Delbert. "The Canadian Manufacturers’ Association and the Tariff." The Canadian Journal of Economics and Political Science vol. 5, no. 1 (1939): 19–39.
- Clark, Samuel Delbert. The Canadian Manufacturers' Association: A Political and Social Study. PhD Dissertation, University of Toronto, 1937.
- Clark, Samuel Delbert. The Canadian Manufacturers' Association: A Study in Collective Bargaining and Political Pressure. University of Toronto Press, 1939.
- Griffin, Watson. "The Canadian Manufacturers’ Tariff Campaign." The North American Review vol. 183, no. 597 (1906): 195–206.
