= Cockshoot =

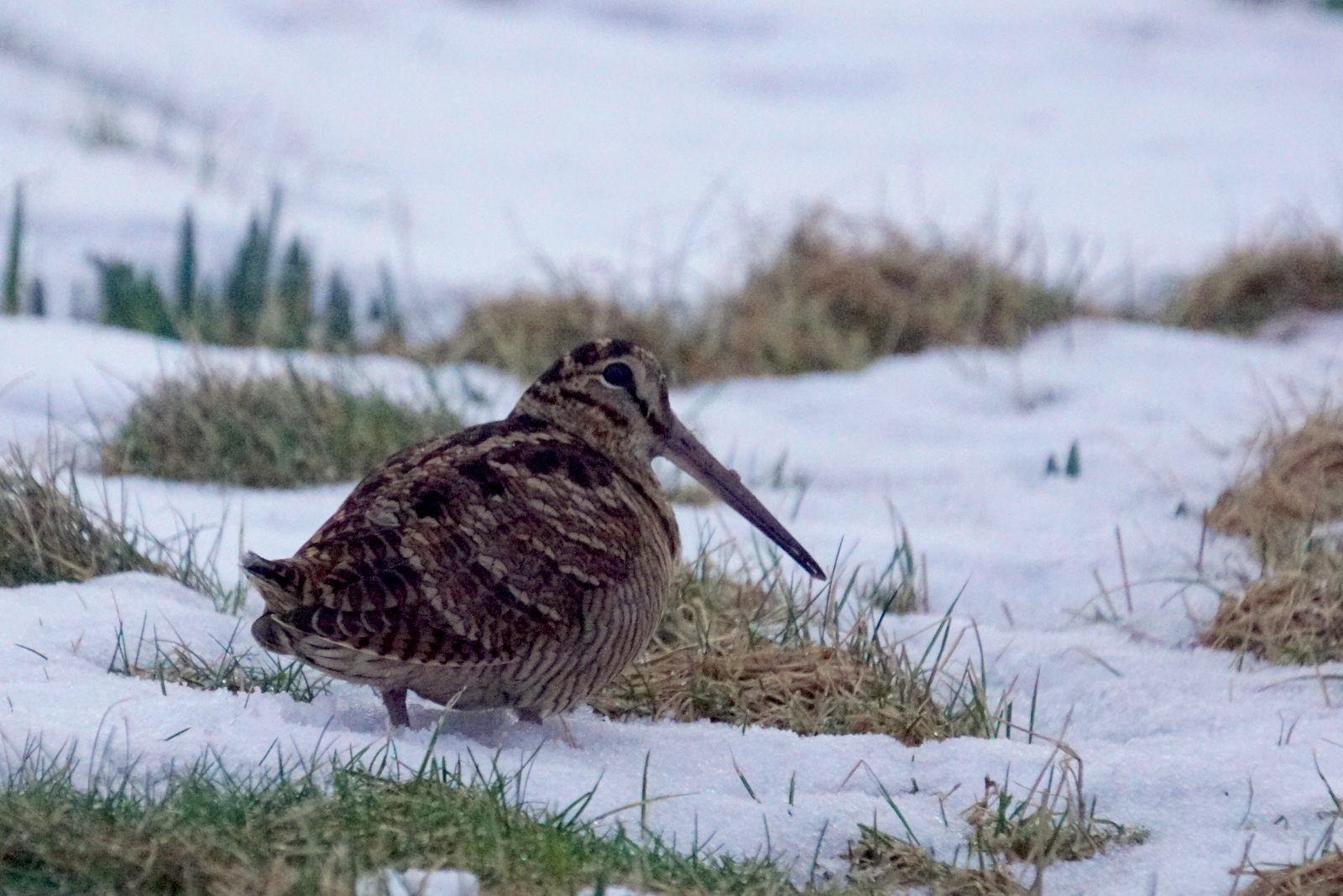
Eurasian woodcock (Scolopax rusticola), often the target of cockshoot traps

In fowl hunting, a cockshoot, also called cockshut or cock-road, was a broad glade, an opening in a forest, through which woodcock might shoot. During the day, woodcocks remain out of sight, unless disturbed; but at night, they take flight in search of water. Flying generally low, they will follow along any openings in the woods. Hunters would place nets across the glade to catch any such birds.

If such broad glades did not exist, hunters would cut roads through woods, thickets, groves, etc. They usually made these roads about 40 ft (12 m) wide, perfectly straight and clear; and to two opposite trees, they tied a net, which had a stone fastened to each corner. Then, having a place to lie hidden, at a proper distance, a stake was placed nearby, to which was fastened the lines of the net. When they perceived the game flying up the road, they unwound the lines from the stake; the stones would then pull down the netting, catching the birds.

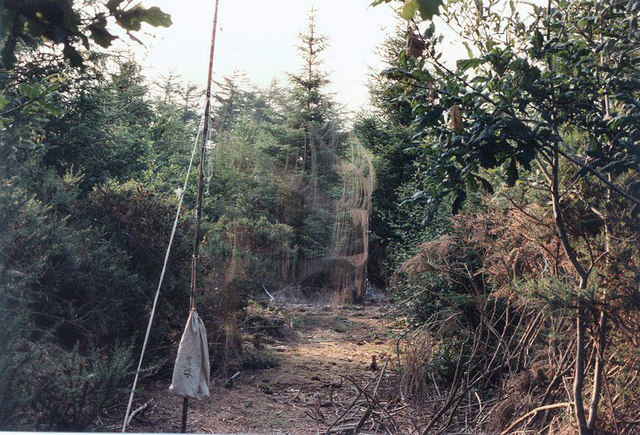
A mist net corridor used in bird ringing, which bears a similar construction to a cockshoot

Various dictionaries erroneously applied the term cockshoot to the net itself, and claimed that the proper spelling was cockshut, believing that the word referred to something which shut in the birds. From this came the phrases cockshut time or light, referring to evening twilight, or nightfall, when woodcocks are likely to fly in the open. This alternate spelling is now more prevalent than the original, though usually occurring as in the previously mentioned phrase, or as a surname, than as a reference to the original, obsolete hunting practice.

== Quotations ==
Richard: Saw'st the melancholly Lord Northumberland?
Ratcliff: Thomas the Earle of Surrey, and himselfe,
Much about Cockshut time, from Troope to Troope
Went through the Army, chearing vp the Souldiers.

— Richard III, by Shakespeare

This drooping flower of youth thou lettest fall
I, faring in the cockshut-light, astray,
Find on my 'lated way,
And stoop, and gather for memorial,
And lay it on my bosom, and make it mine.

— Before Her Portrait in Youth, by Francis Thompson

== See also ==
- Cockshutt (disambiguation)
