= Lloyd Harris (Canadian politician) =

Canadian politician

Lloyd Harris (March 14, 1867 – September 27, 1925) was a businessman and politician in Ontario, Canada. He represented Brantford in the House of Commons of Canada from 1908 to 1911 as a Liberal.

Harris was born in Beamsville, Ontario, the son of John Harris and Alice Jane Tufford, and was educated in Brantford and Woodstock. He joined A. Harris, Son & Co. Ltd., a firm established by his grandfather, Alanson Harris, which manufactured farm equipment and later became part of Massey-Harris. He was president of a number of companies, including the Canada Glue Company, the Brantford Screw Company, and the Harris Trust Company.

During the First World War Harris headed the Canadian War Mission in Washington, the Canadian government's wartime representation in the United States, until November 1918, when Sir Charles Gordon succeeded him as acting chairman; he then led the Canadian Trade Mission in London, working with Gordon's Canadian Trade Commission to find European markets for Canadian goods.

Harris served on the town council for Brantford from 1905 to 1906.

He married three times:

- to Mary Catherine Perkins in 1887;
- to Evelyn Frances Blackmore in 1896 (this marriage ended in divorce in March 1924); and
- to Jane Hendrick Robertson, the widow of John Sinclair Robertson, in April 1924.

Harris was nominated as a candidate for the 1925 federal election but died in Brantford before the election was held.

== See also ==
- Bell Telephone Memorial
