= Alanson Harris =

Canadian businessman

- Born: April 1, 1816; Ingersoll, Upper Canada
- Died: October 3, 1894 (aged 78); Brantford, Ontario
- Resting place: Greenwood Cemetery, Brantford, Ontario
- Occupations: sawmill operator, businessman

Alanson Harris (April 1, 1816 – October 3, 1894) was a Canadian businessman. He was a sawmill operator and later owner of a farm implement manufacturer in Brantford, Ontario.

Alanson Harris was born in Ingersoll, Upper Canada in 1816 to John Harris (a native of Mohawk Valley in New York State) and Catherine Jane Dygert.

Alanson Harris began his career as a manufacturer. After moving to Brantford, Ontario, in the 1870s he formed A. Harris, Son and Company Limited to manufacture farm implements. Harris plant was located on Market Street South and later moved to Colborne Street.

His son John Harris was instrumental in growing the nascent company and the firm merged with rival Hart Massey's company Massey Manufacturing in 1891 to form Massey-Harris, which later became the farm machinery giant Massey Ferguson.

Alanson Harris died in 1894 and is buried at Greenwood Cemetery. Another son Elmore Harris was a well noted pastor in Toronto, his grandson Lawren Harris and great-grandson Lawren P. Harris were noted artists.

== Harris facilities ==
- Beamsville, Ontario 1857–1881
- Brantford, Ontario
  - George Street and Colborne Street East 1881
  - South Market Street south of Icomm Drive (Brantford District Civic Centre) 1882-1964
  - Henry Street and Wayne Gretzky Parkway (Park Road North) 1964-1988
    - 225 Henry Street now used by Channel Control Merchants, Ply Gem Building Products; Lowe's Home Improvement Warehouse Princess Auto and Michael's
