= Harriet Brooks =

Canadian nuclear physicist (1876–1933)

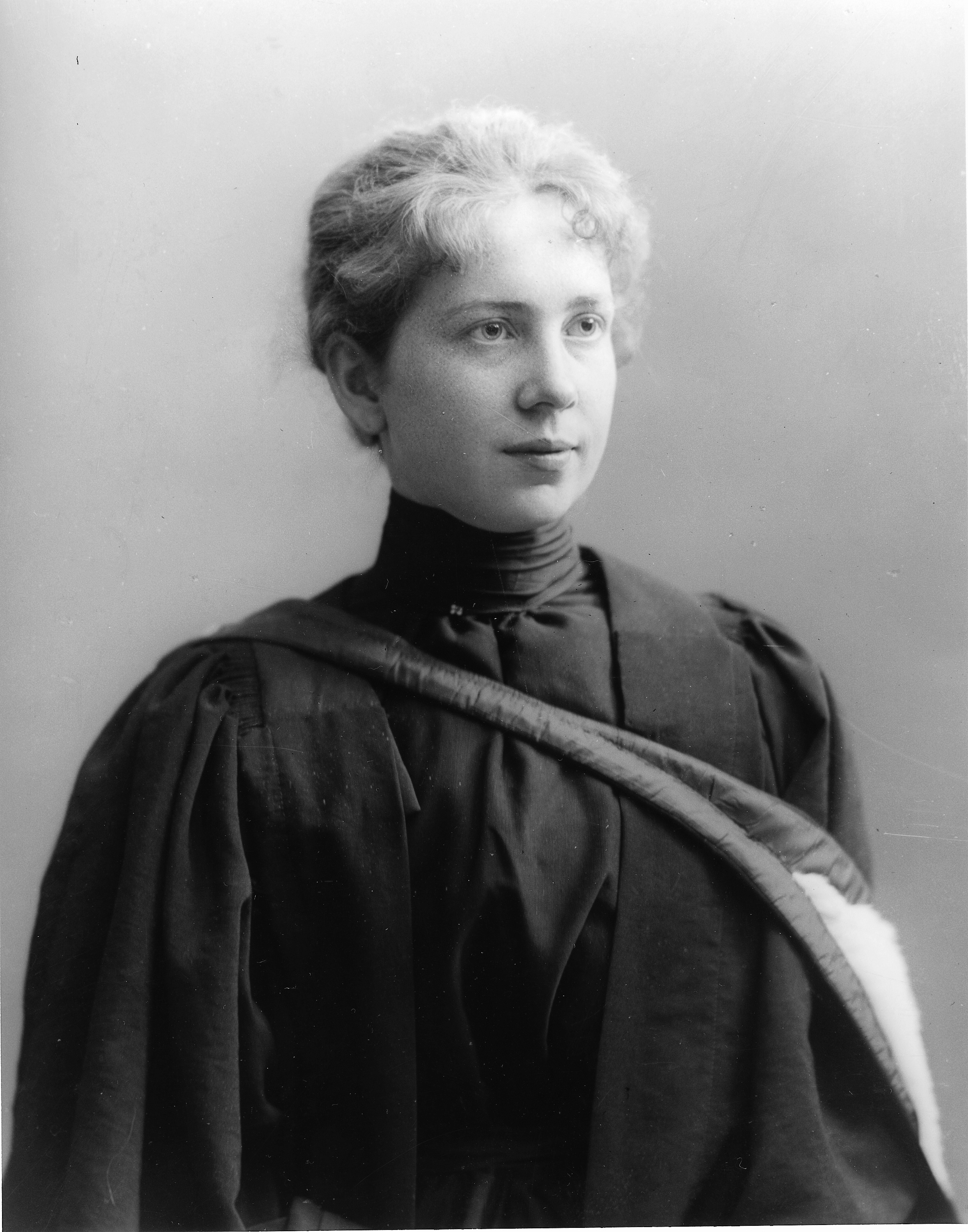
- Harriet Brooks in 1898
- Born: July 2, 1876; Exeter, Ontario
- Died: April 17, 1933 (aged 56)
- Education: McGill University
- Known for: Discoverer of atomic recoil
- Scientific career
- Fields: Nuclear physics
- Workplaces: Barnard College; McGill University; Curie Institute
- Academic advisors: Ernest Rutherford

Harriet Brooks (July 2, 1876 – April 17, 1933) was a Canadian nuclear physicist. She is most famous for her research in radioactivity. She discovered atomic recoil, and transmutation of elements in radioactive decay. Ernest Rutherford, who guided her graduate work, regarded her as comparable to Marie Curie in the calibre of her aptitude. She was among the first to discover radon and to try to determine its atomic mass.

== Biography ==
=== Early years ===
Harriet Brooks was born in Exeter, Ontario, on July 2, 1876, to George and Elizabeth Warden Brooks. She was the third of nine children. Her father, George Brooks, worked at his own flour mill until it burned down and was not covered by insurance. He then supported the family by working as a commercial traveler for a flour firm. Brooks moved around Quebec and Ontario with her family during her childhood. At some point, she attended the Seaforth Collegiate Institute in Ontario. Her family finally settled in Montreal.

=== Undergraduate education ===
Harriet Brooks entered McGill University in 1894, the only one beside her sister Elizabeth who would attend university and six years after McGill graduated its first female student. While Brooks won a scholarship for the final two years of her Bachelor's degree, gender discrimination disqualified her from receiving a scholarship for her first two years. Brooks graduated with a first-class honours B.A. in mathematics and natural philosophy in 1898, and was awarded the Anne Molson Memorial prize for outstanding performance in mathematics.

=== Graduate research ===
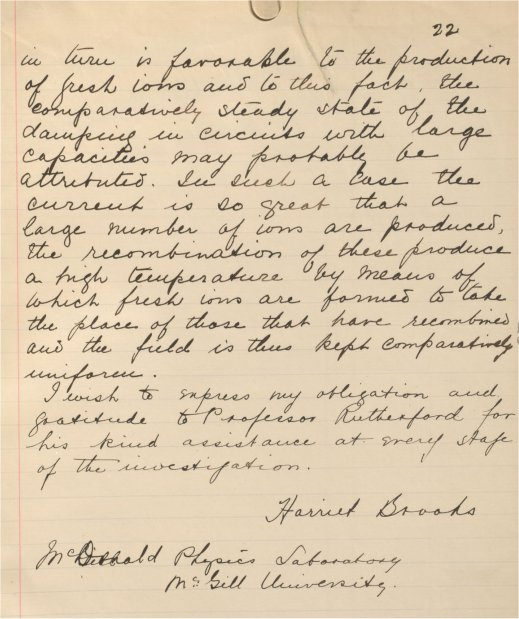
Last page thesis Harriet Brooks 1901, thanking Rutherford

Brooks was the first graduate student in Canada of Sir Ernest Rutherford, under whom she worked immediately after graduating. With Rutherford, she studied electricity and magnetism for her master's degree. In 1899, even before her thesis was completed, her work on damping of electrical oscillations was published in the Transactions of the Canadian Section of the Royal Society. The same year, Brooks received an appointment as nonresident tutor at the newly formed Royal Victoria College, the women's college of McGill University. In 1901, she became the first woman at McGill University to receive a master's degree.

After her master's degree in 1901, she did a series of experiments to determine the nature of the radioactive emissions from thorium. These experiments served as one of the foundations for the development of nuclear science. Papers by Rutherford and Brooks in 1901 and 1902 were published in Royal Society Transactions and in the Philosophical Magazine.

In 1901, Brooks obtained a fellowship to study for her doctorate of physics at Bryn Mawr College in Pennsylvania. During her year there, Brooks won the prestigious Bryn Mawr European Fellowship. Rutherford arranged for Brooks to take this fellowship at his former lab at the University of Cambridge, where she became the first woman to study at the Cavendish Laboratory. While her research at Cambridge on the radioactive decay of radium and thorium was successful, her supervisor J.J. Thomson was preoccupied with his own research and ignored her progress. She saw the irrelevance of advanced degrees in the British context.

In 1903, Brooks returned to her position at Royal Victoria College and rejoined Rutherford's group, carrying out research that was published in 1904.

== Career ==
=== Barnard College and marriage controversy (1905–1906) ===
In 1905, Brooks was appointed to the faculty of Barnard College in New York City and for two years she did not research but teach. When in 1906, she became engaged to a Columbia University physics professor, Dean Laura Gil of Barnard responded by saying "that whenever your marriage does take place it ought to end your official relationship with the college". This began a heated exchange of letters, in which Brooks conveyed that she felt she had a duty to both her profession and her sex to continue her work even after marriage. Brooks was backed by the head of Barnard's physics department, Margaret Maltby. However, Dean Gil cited the college's trustees, who argued that one could not be both a married woman and a successful academic. Brooks broke off her engagement and agreed to stay at Barnard.

=== European period and research connections (1906–1907) ===
In the summer of 1906, Brooks moved to a retreat in the Adirondack Mountains run by John and Prestonia Martin, two prominent Fabian Socialists. Through the Martins, she became acquainted with Russian author Maxim Gorky. In October 1906, Brooks travelled with Gorky and a group of other Russians to the Italian island of Capri. During this time, Brooks met Marie Curie, and shortly after started working as one of Curie's staff at the Institut du Radium in Paris, France. Although none of Brooks' research was published under her name during this period, her contributions were considered valuable and she was cited in three contemporary articles published under the aegis of the Curie Institute.

During this time, Brooks secured a position at the University of Manchester. In the letter of recommendation Rutherford wrote for Brooks' application, he noted that "next to Mme Curie she is the most prominent woman physicist in the department of radioactivity. Miss Brooks is an original and careful worker with good experimental powers and I am confident that if appointed she would do most excellent research work in Physics".

=== Departure from physics ===
Brooks decided to terminate her physics career for unknown reasons, giving room for speculation. In 1992, it has been suggested that "provinciality and social convention" turned her away from physics, while others have pointed out, that she had met women academics and could have continued research, "but she preferred conventional pleasures".

== Personal life and death ==
In 1907, at the age of 31, Brooks married Frank Pitcher, a wealthy engineer of the Montreal Power and Water Company and a former McGill physics instructor, and settled in Montreal. She had three children, two of whom tragically died in their teens. Her life revolved around domestic life, organizing the activities of household servants. She remained active in organizations of university women, but no longer did any work in the field of physics.

Her sister Elizabeth married physicist Arthur Stewart Eve. Her sister Edith married the Montreal manufacturer Charles Blair Gordon, later president of the Bank of Montreal, and the Gordons' house on Queen Mary Road adjoined the Pitchers' property.

Brooks died April 17, 1933, in Montreal at the age of 56 "of a 'blood disorder'", presumably leukaemia caused by radiation exposure.

The obituary in The New York Times on April 18, 1933 credited her as the "Discoverer of the Recoil of a Radioactive Atom."

Rutherford wrote her obituary in the journal Nature.

== Legacy ==
=== Firsts ===
Brooks achieved a series of significant firsts during the early development of nuclear science:

First Canadian woman nuclear physicist. Brooks is widely recognized as the first woman in Canada to conduct research in nuclear physics. Her experiments on radioactivity at McGill University placed her among the earliest contributors to the study of radioactive materials.

First woman to earn a master's degree from McGill University (1901). Brooks became the first woman to receive a McGill M.A. after completing research on electrical oscillations and thorium emissions under Ernest Rutherford. This milestone helped establish the presence of women in advanced scientific study in Canada.

First graduate student in Canada supervised by Ernest Rutherford. Brooks joined Rutherford's laboratory immediately after her undergraduate degree, becoming his first Canadian graduate student. Her work with him contributed to early understandings of radioactive behavior.

First woman permitted to carry out research at the Cavendish Laboratory. With the support of the Bryn Mawr European Fellowship, Brooks became the first woman to conduct research at the Cavendish Laboratory at the University of Cambridge. Her admission to this leading physics laboratory marked an important step toward including women in advanced research environments.

Among the first scientists to show that radioactive decay transforms one element into another. Brooks's thorium experiments provided early evidence for elemental transformation, helping establish the idea that radioactive decay occurs through a sequence of changes.

Among the earliest researchers to identify and measure radon. In 1901 and 1902, Brooks isolated the gas now called radon and produced one of the first recorded measurements of its half-life. Her estimate for the half-life of thoron (radon 220) was close to the modern accepted value.

Among the first researchers to observe radioactive recoil. Brooks described the behavior of the active material that recoiled from surfaces after alpha emission. This early observation helped clarify how particles move during radioactive decay.

One of the first to demonstrate induced radioactivity. Brooks showed that non-radioactive materials became radioactive when stored in a radioactive container. This discovery helped scientists understand how decay products transfer between substances.

One of the earliest women appointed to a physics faculty in the United States. In 1904, Brooks joined the physics faculty at Barnard College. Her attempt to continue academic work after becoming engaged raised public debate about whether women could combine marriage with a scientific career, illustrating the social pressures she faced.

One of the first women outside the Curie laboratory to be credited in published radium research. While working at the Curie Institute in Paris, Brooks was acknowledged in scientific publications that reflected her contributions to studies of radioactive materials.

One of the first Canadian women scientists whose contributions were recovered through archival research. After being largely forgotten for decades, Brooks's scientific work was reconstructed by historians in the late twentieth century, revealing the extent of her influence on early nuclear science.

== Awards and honours ==
=== Academic and scientific recognition ===
- Received the President's European Fellowship, an academic scholarship that supported research at the Cavendish Laboratory.
- Elected as a member of the McGill University Physics Society in recognition of her research at McGill University.
- Credited as a contributor to scientific work at the Curie Institute in Paris.

=== Institutional and national honours ===
- Inducted into the Canadian Science and Engineering Hall of Fame in 2002 as national recognition of her contributions to early nuclear science.
- Honoured with the naming of the Harriet Brooks Building at Chalk River Laboratories, an environmentally certified research facility opened in 2016.
- Commemorated by the Government of Canada with a national scientific computing system named "Harriet Brooks" in 2017.

=== Public and cultural recognition ===
- Featured on the cover of the Canadian Journal of Physics in January 2015.
- Highlighted in modern educational and historical materials produced by institutions such as McGill University.

=== Historical and archival recognition ===
- Described in her 1933 New York Times obituary as the "Discoverer of the Recoil of a Radioactive Atom".
- Honoured in a 1933 obituary written by Ernest Rutherford in Nature.
- Recognized through late twentieth century archival research that restored her place in early nuclear history.
