= John Harris (manufacturer) =

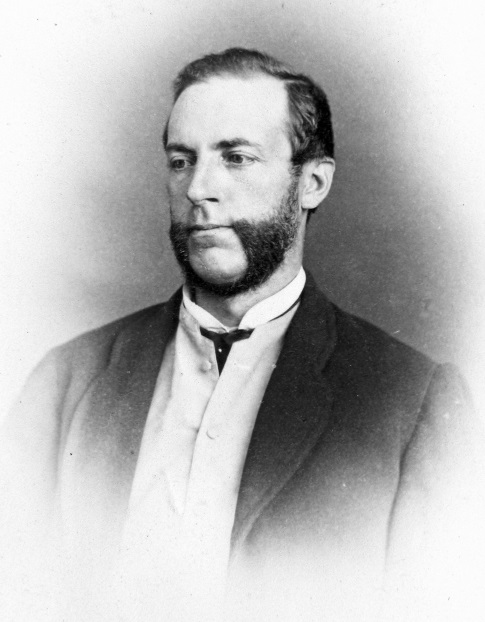
John Harris

John Harris (21 July 1841 – 25 August 1887) was a Canadian businessman. He was the eldest son of Alanson Harris, the founder of A. Harris, Son and Company, a farm implement company that was a predecessor to Massey-Harris and subsequently Massey Ferguson.

Harris married Alice Jane Tufford of Beamsville in 1863 and had nine children, including the businessman and politician Lloyd Harris.

Born in Townsend Township, in Norfolk County, Canada West, Harris died in Brantford, Ontario, in 1887.
