= William Foster Cockshutt =

Canadian politician

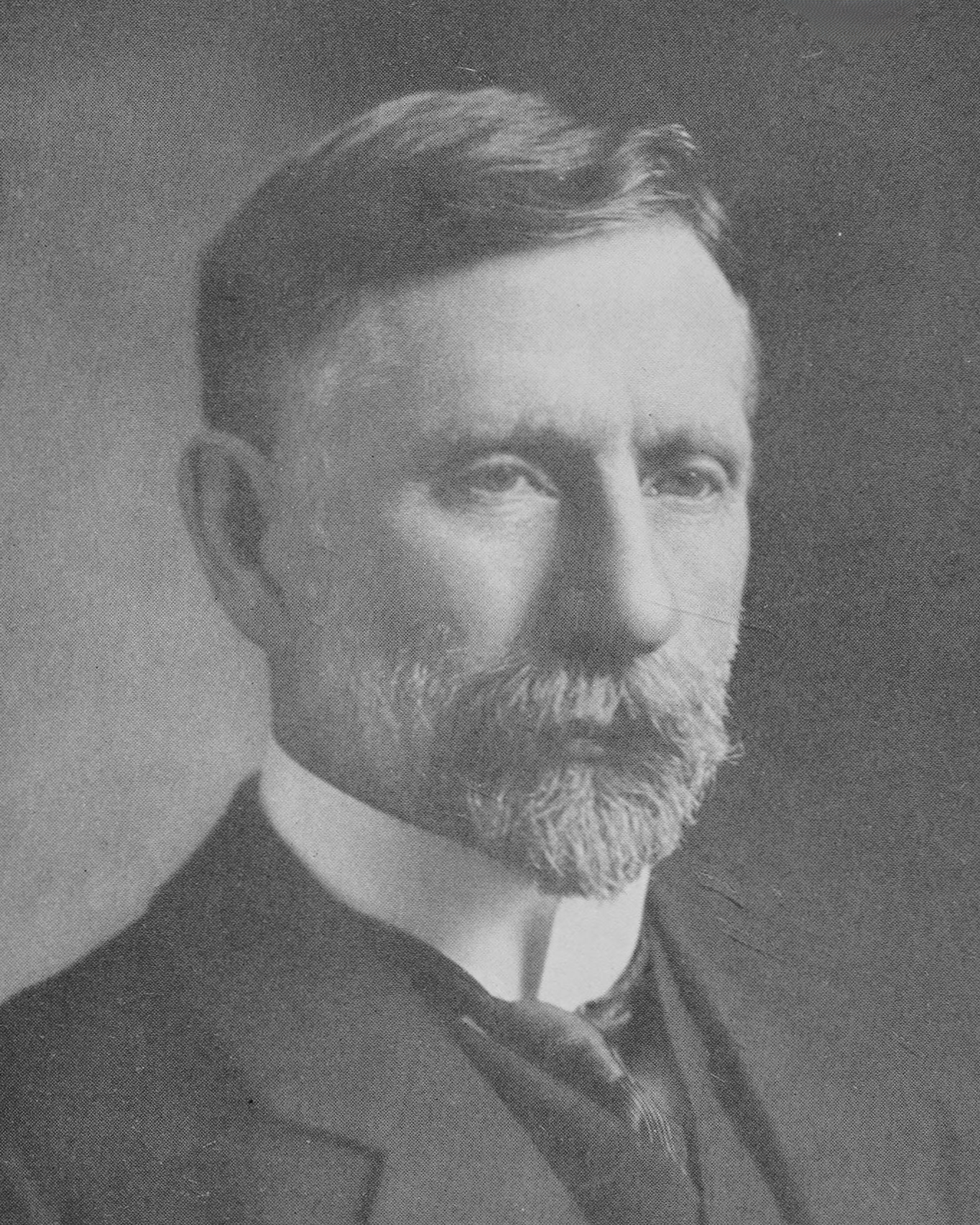

Member of the Canadian Parliament for Brantford
- In office 1904–1908
- Preceded by: District was created in 1903
- Succeeded by: Lloyd Harris
- In office 1911–1921
- Preceded by: Lloyd Harris
- Succeeded by: William Gawtress Raymond

Personal details
- Born: October 17, 1855 Brantford, Canada West
- Died: November 22, 1939 (aged 84)
- Party: Conservative

William Foster Cockshutt (October 17, 1855 – November 22, 1939) was a Canadian politician.

Born in Brantford, Canada West, the son of Ignatius Cockshutt, Cockshutt was educated in Brantford and at the Galt College Institute. He worked for a produce firm and in a tea warehouse in England before returning to Ontario and entering the family business in partnership with his brother James. A merchant and manufacturer, he was a member of the Hydro-Electric Power Commission. He was president of the Cockshutt Plow Company from 1885 until 1888, stepping in after his brother's death from tuberculosis at 34 years of age. In 1888, he was named president of the local Board of Trade.

Cockshutt was an unsuccessful candidate in the federal riding of Brant South in 1887. He was first elected to the House of Commons of Canada for the electoral district of Brantford in the 1904 general elections. A Conservative, he was defeated in 1908. He was re-elected in 1911 and 1917. He was defeated again in 1921. He was an honorary colonel of the 125th Battalion, Canadian Expeditionary Force.

In 1891, he married Minnie Turner Ashton.

== Electoral record ==
1887 Canadian federal election: Brant South
Party	Candidate	Votes
Liberal	William Paterson	2,230
Conservative	William Foster Cockshutt	1,656

== See also ==
- Bell Telephone Memorial

== Arms ==
Coat of arms of William Foster Cockshutt

Crest
A demi-griffin Sable.
Escutcheon
Gules guttee Argent on a chief Or a griffin passant Sable.
