= Charles Blair Gordon =

Canadian industrialist and banker (1867–1939)

Sir Charles Blair Gordon GBE
- Gordon in March 1939, wearing the insignia of a Knight Grand Cross of the Order of the British Empire
- Born: 22 November 1867; Montreal, Province of Canada
- Died: 30 July 1939 (aged 71); Royal Victoria Hospital, Montreal, Quebec, Canada
- Resting place: Mount Royal Cemetery, Montreal
- Occupations: Manufacturer, banker
- Known for: President of Dominion Textile and the Bank of Montreal; vice-chairman of the Imperial Munitions Board
- Title: President of the Bank of Montreal (1927–1939)
- Spouse: Edith Annie Brooks (m. 1897)
- Children: 3
- Relatives: Harriet Brooks (sister-in-law); Arthur Stewart Eve (brother-in-law)

Sir Charles Blair Gordon (22 November 1867 – 30 July 1939) was a Canadian industrialist and banker. Starting as a dry-goods clerk in Montreal, he built the Standard Shirt Company into a large clothing manufacturer supplying much of the Canadian market, helped found Dominion Textile in 1905 and served as its president for most of the period from 1909 until his death, by which time it was Canada's dominant cotton-textile producer. He also organized the Dominion Glass Company in 1913 and headed Penmans and Montreal Cottons, and was president of the Canadian Manufacturers' Association in 1913–14.

During the First World War Gordon served as vice-chairman of the Imperial Munitions Board under Joseph Flavelle from December 1915 and, from mid-1917, as the Ministry of Munitions' representative in the United States and director-general of war supplies with the British War Mission in Washington, D.C. He was appointed a Knight Commander of the Order of the British Empire (KBE) in 1917 and promoted to Knight Grand Cross of the Order of the British Empire (GBE) in 1918. After the war he chaired the Canadian Trade Commission and represented Canada, with Édouard Montpetit, at the Genoa Conference of 1922.

A director of the Bank of Montreal from 1912 and a vice-president from 1916, Gordon succeeded Sir Vincent Meredith as its president in 1927 and held the office until his death, leading the bank through the Great Depression and publicly opposing the creation of a central bank; his portrait appeared on the bank's own notes from 1931. He resumed the presidency of Dominion Textile in 1933, and the company's abrupt closure of its Sherbrooke rayon mill in January 1936, in protest against reduced tariffs on Japanese textiles, prompted a royal commission on the textile industry under W. F. A. Turgeon, whose report of 1938 condemned the company's conduct and the returns enjoyed by its founding syndicate. Rated among the wealthiest men in Canada, Gordon died suddenly in Montreal in July 1939.

== Early life ==
Gordon was born in Montreal on 22 November 1867, the son of John Gordon, who ran a wholesale dry goods business in the city, and Jane (Jeanie) Roy. His father, born in Aberdeen in 1833, had emigrated in 1853 to work for the dry-goods importers William Stephen and Company; he became a partner in the wholesale house of James Roy and Son and from the mid-1880s headed his own firm of manufacturers' agents, John Gordon and Son, which Gordon's brother James Roy Gordon carried on after his death in October 1895. Gordon was the eldest of four children; his brothers were James Roy and William George Ross Gordon and his sister Elizabeth. After public school he attended the High School of Montreal. His first job, at nineteen, was clerking in the dry-goods store of McIntyre, Son and Company; two years later he moved to the wholesaler J. P. Black and Company as a shipping clerk.

== Standard Shirt Company ==
The Standard Shirt Company's factory on De Lorimier Avenue, Montreal, in a bird's-eye engraving published in The Book of Montreal in 1903

About 1891 Gordon went into business for himself with the Standard Shirt Company, which first appears in Lovell's Montreal directory for 1891–92 in a rear building at 36 Dowd Street, while Gordon was still living at his parents' house on Palace Street. By the summer of 1893 the firm was putting up a factory on De Lorimier Avenue in the east end of the city, next door to a rolling mill. It obtained federal letters patent in April 1895, with a capital stock of $200,000, half of which was taken up by Gordon and his partners. The applicants for the charter, the Dry Goods Review reported in February 1895, were W. Yuile, James Roy Gordon, Gordon himself, Samuel Bell and A. McIntyre. Bell served as the company's president and Gordon as its managing director; the firm made shirts, collars and cuffs, overalls and, later, blouses and skirts, and sold them through the family agency, John Gordon and Son, in Montreal and through agents in Toronto and London. At the annual meeting of May 1901, when the usual dividend of 8 per cent was paid, the shareholders decided to increase the capital to $1 million; the company by then employed 1,000 hands and was shipping regularly to South Africa and Australia. By 1903 it occupied five buildings, numbered 189 to 213 De Lorimier Avenue, with about five acres of floor space, its own power plant, electrically driven machinery and cutting knives and a laundry; it had a workforce of about 1,200, met much of the demand of the Canadian market and exported to South Africa and Australia. (Note: The Dictionary of Canadian Biography describes a "five-acre site". The Book of Montreal (1903), from which the figures derive, says that the five buildings "contain floor space of about five acres".) In October 1904 Gordon, the financier David Yuile, Gordon's brother James Roy Gordon and others obtained letters patent for a new Standard Shirt Manufacturing Company, capitalized at $1 million, to take over the business, and by 1905 Gordon was its president as well as its managing director. In 1906 the shirt company was merged with three other Montreal makers of shirts and whitewear—J. P. Black and Company, the G. H. Harrower Company and A. H. Sims and Company—into the Canadian Converters' Company, capitalized at $3 million, of which J. P. Black became president; Gordon sat on its board, and by 1913 his brothers James Roy and William were respectively its president and a director. The shirt company's success made Gordon's name in Montreal business circles.

== Dominion Textile ==
Gordon in May 1905, on his appointment as managing director of the new Dominion Textile Company, from the Dry Goods Review

In 1904 Gordon, then aged 37, joined a syndicate led by Yuile that brought together four struggling Canadian cotton companies—Dominion Cotton Mills, the Merchants' Cotton Company, the Montmorency Cotton Mills Company and the Colonial Bleaching and Printing Company—to form the Dominion Textile Company, which was chartered on 4 January 1905. The historian of the company, Barbara J. Austin, has called the merger "a desperate move" intended to curb competition and steady the trade. Contemporary financial journalists believed that the merger had been prompted by the Bank of Montreal, which had millions tied up in the cotton companies, and that Gordon and J. P. Black had been brought in for their knowledge of the trade. Gordon borrowed to buy 496 shares at $100 each and was named second vice-president and managing director, with the job of getting the new company started and managing it. Yuile was president and Louis-Joseph Forget first vice-president, and the executive included Herbert Samuel Holt, Henry Vincent Meredith, Senator Robert Mackay, J. P. Black and David Williamson. Because of his role in getting the company started, Gordon shares with Yuile the title of founder. The syndicate's terms were generous to its members: the company's secretary told a royal commission in 1908 that its $5 million of common stock had cost the original owners "ten cents on the dollar", so that a dividend of 5 per cent returned 50 per cent on their outlay, and the Turgeon commission calculated in 1938 that the $500,000 the syndicate had put into common stock had yielded an average annual return of more than 98 per cent.

Dominion Textile's mill at Montmorency Falls, near Quebec City, one of the plants brought into the company in 1905, in an aerial photograph of about 1927

Dominion Textile was from the outset the largest company in the Canadian cotton trade, producing about 45 per cent of the country's cotton textiles from eleven mills. In the spring of 1908, in a trade recession, it joined the other Canadian cotton companies in cutting wages by 10 per cent, and strikes followed at its Magog, Montmorency, Hochelaga and Saint-Henri mills; Gordon told the Dry Goods Review that the company wanted "to give our employes work" and believed that they would "prefer a reduction in wages to a closing down of the mills", and the dispute was investigated by a royal commission conducted by the deputy minister of labour, William Lyon Mackenzie King. In February 1909 the Quebec Superior Court annulled, at the suit of two dissenting shareholders, the lease under which Dominion Textile ran the mills of Dominion Cotton Mills, which it did not wholly own; Gordon said the company would simply operate Dominion Cotton as a subsidiary, and the litigation continued until a Privy Council decision of 1917 finally settled the claims of the dissenting shareholders in the company's favour. When Yuile died in June 1909 a special meeting of the directors on 19 July elected Gordon president and managing director; Saturday Night's Montreal correspondent described "the clean shaven, boyish looking chap over at the Dominion Textile Company's place" whose promotion had made his former workmates "fairly gasp". He appointed Francis Galvin Daniels as general manager, and while Daniels reorganized and consolidated the mills, Gordon took a leading role in lobbying for protective tariffs. Dominion Textile was closely linked to the Penman Manufacturing Company, Canada's biggest maker of woollen goods, which its board took control of in 1906 and renamed Penmans Limited; Penman's president, David Morrice, had belonged to the Dominion Textile syndicate, and when he died in 1914 Gordon, the vice-president, took over the Penmans presidency too. Gordon had also sat since at least 1908, with Holt, Forget and Black, on the board of the Montreal Cotton Company of Valleyfield, whose management Dominion Textile assumed in 1911 and of which he was vice-president and later president. Under his leadership the company grew steadily; by 1911 the Montreal Daily Star ranked him a millionaire.

== Other business interests ==
Gordon in October 1912, on his election as first vice-president of the Canadian Manufacturers' Association, from the association's journal Industrial Canada

Gordon became a director of the Molsons Bank in August 1909, filling the seat of his first employer, W. C. McIntyre, of C. Meredith and Company in 1910, of which he was vice-president by 1913, of the Bank of Montreal in 1912 and, by 1913, of the Royal Trust Company and the Dominion Bridge Company; he was elected vice-president for Quebec of the Canadian Manufacturers' Association in 1911 and its first vice-president in 1912. A Quebec royal commission on industrial accidents appointed in 1907, on which he sat with the lawyer Arthur Globensky and the labour leader Georges Marois, led to the province's Workmen's Compensation Act of 1909, and in a signed statement in the association's journal in 1912 he observed that Canadians and Americans "probably do not realize how far behind the rest of the world they are in this matter". He chaired the meeting that founded the Greater Montreal Housing and Planning Association in March 1913 and served as chairman of the Metropolitan Parks Commission. With Holt, Sir Hugh Montagu Allan and Charles Hosmer he was one of the founders of the Ritz-Carlton Hotel, built in 1911–12, and he later served as president of the Ritz-Carlton Hotel Company. In 1913 he led the syndicate that merged the Diamond Flint Glass, Canadian Glass, Sydenham Glass, Manitoba Glass and Jefferson Glass companies into the Dominion Glass Company, whose preferred shares his own house, C. Meredith and Company, placed with a London syndicate; George A. Grier was the new company's first president and Gordon its vice-president, and he later became president. The company eventually controlled plants in Montreal, Hamilton, Wallaceburg, Beausejour and Redcliff. He was also president of Hillcrest Collieries Limited, the owner of the Alberta coal mine at which 189 men died in the Hillcrest mine disaster of June 1914.

Gordon (right), retiring as president of the Canadian Manufacturers' Association, with his successor, E. G. Henderson, at the association's Montreal convention in June 1914

At the association's annual convention in Halifax in September 1913 he was elected its national president for 1913–14. (Note: The Dictionary of Canadian Biography dates his presidency of the association to 1914, and the obituaries of 1939 stated that he held the office when the First World War broke out. The association's journal, Industrial Canada, records his election at the Halifax convention of 16–18 September 1913 and his retirement at the Montreal convention of 9–11 June 1914, and the Canadian Annual Review for 1913 lists him as president for 1913–14.) Presiding at the convention dinner as incoming president, he declared that although the tariff was "generally satisfactory to the manufacturers' interests", the passage of time had let "inconsistencies" creep into it, and he asked for adjusted duties on the semi-finished materials used by the iron and steel industries; later in his term he urged the continuance of the protective National Policy and criticized the Ontario workmen's compensation bill then before the provincial legislature as impracticable, and he handed the office to E. G. Henderson of Windsor at the Montreal convention of June 1914. He was one of the eight businessmen who founded the town of Hampstead, Quebec, incorporated in 1914, and served as vice-president of the Hampstead Land and Construction Company, of which Holt was president.

== First World War ==
The war brought a boom to Dominion Textile, which received orders, small at first and then huge, for uniform cloth, tenting and other material for the Canadian Expeditionary Force and, once the United States entered the war in 1917, for the American forces as well. Gordon's own war service was varied. In August 1914 he offered the government his steam yacht Semiramis and her crew "for any required service"; the Naval Service used her, with J. K. L. Ross's Albacore, for defence on the east coast, and the minister, J. D. Hazen, acknowledged the loan by name in the House of Commons in March 1915—the thanks of Parliament that his obituaries later recalled when they noted that the yacht, fully manned, had served on coastal duty for the whole of the war. With Mackay, Meredith and Huntly Redpath Drummond he paid for the equipment of a Canadian motor machine-gun unit, and as a Bank of Montreal director he advised Ottawa on the British credits that paid for wartime purchases in Canada, attending the meeting of bankers at Ottawa in June 1916 that raised the banks' loans to the British government to $150 million.

Drilling components for No. 80 time fuses at a Canadian munitions plant in 1916, from a booklet issued by the Imperial Munitions Board; the supply of fuses was the problem the board gave Gordon to solve

In November 1915 the Ministry of Munitions' emissary, Lionel Hichens, announced the creation of the Imperial Munitions Board (IMB), the British Ministry of Munitions' only buying agent in Canada, under the chairmanship of Joseph Flavelle, adding that Gordon "has kindly promised to devote a great part of his time to the work"; Gordon joined the board at the beginning of December and became its vice-chairman. (Note: The Dictionary of Canadian Biography dates his appointment as vice-chairman to 1 December 1915, and the official History of the Ministry of Munitions lists him as vice-chairman from December 1915. The same history's account of the board states that General Alexander Bertram, the former chairman of the Shell Committee, joined the new board as deputy chairman and that on 21 January 1916 Gordon "was also appointed Deputy-Chairman". Gordon himself told the Royal Commission on Shell Contracts in May 1916 that he had joined the board "about the first of December".) He had hoped to combine the post with his work at Dominion Textile, but he and Flavelle soon found themselves working full-time for the board; strategic direction of the company was shared with Holt while Daniels ran its day-to-day operations. With Flavelle, David Carnegie and Frederick Perry, Gordon formed the board's inner executive. The IMB had inherited from Sir Sam Hughes's Shell Committee contracts worth more than $282 million with over 400 factories, and its most serious problem was the supply of time and percussion fuses, which could not be made in Canada and which American contractors had failed to deliver. Gordon was given the problem to solve and recommended that fuses be made in Canada; the board set up its first "national factory", British Munitions Limited, at Verdun, which opened in the spring of 1916 with skilled workers brought from Britain and shipped its last fuses in May 1918. The official history of the Ministry of Munitions records that within weeks the board had cut the prices of contracts already placed by some $4 million, and that "on one fuse contract alone, Mr. Gordon forced the contractors to revise their terms and secured a saving of some $1,800,000". When the Meredith–Duff Royal Commission on Shell Contracts examined the Shell Committee's dealings in 1916, Gordon gave evidence on the fuse contracts on 17 May, and the commissioners found that his testimony "establishes beyond question" that $4.50 had been a reasonable price for a time fuse in the spring of 1915. In 1916 he also dealt with labour shortages in the munitions factories by persuading the army to release enlisted men for factory work, representing the board with Flavelle at a conference of ministers, manufacturers and labour leaders in Ottawa that September; sorted out the competing commitments of steel producers such as Algoma Steel; and played a part in establishing a flying-training school and the national aircraft factory, Canadian Aeroplanes Limited, in Toronto. One contemporary obituary claimed that "probably few men, even in Great Britain and the United States, supervised such huge expenditures", with contracts worth many hundreds of millions of dollars coming to him for ratification.

In April 1917 Gordon and his wife sailed from New York on an IMB mission to Britain, passing through the zone of the newly declared German unrestricted submarine campaign; "we had an exciting day," he told Flavelle after the passengers had watched the wreckage of several boats drift past and distress flares go up from others. While he was still in England, on 2 June 1917, the ministry appointed him to take charge of all its organizations in the United States, whose purchasing had until then been handled largely through J. P. Morgan and Company. Returning to Ottawa in late June, he almost immediately left the board to become deputy to Lord Northcliffe, who headed the British War Mission in Washington. Gordon served there as the Ministry of Munitions' representative and as the United Kingdom's director of war supplies, with R. H. Brand as his assistant, a job that kept him moving between Washington and New York; the ministry's production and inspection departments in the United States were placed under him, and it was through him that the mission's requirements for steel, copper and other materials were submitted to the American purchasing authorities. F. E. Smith, the British attorney general, who toured Canada and the United States in early 1918 with Gordon's help and became a close friend, described him as "a man with a very sleepy manner, but a very vigilant brain". Gordon disliked the work and his British colleagues—he privately called Northcliffe "a mount[e]bank"—and his years of experience were largely ignored by Northcliffe's successor, Lord Reading, but he wrote to Flavelle in 1918 that he would "serve the Government to the best of my ability" for as long as the war lasted. In the autumn of 1917 he crossed to London with Northcliffe and Reading for the inter-Allied conference, and in May 1918 the ministry's American agencies were grouped as the Department of War Supplies under him, with the additional title of director-general of war supplies. (Note: Who's Who in the British War Mission (1918) dates the title to March 1918.) Sir Henry Babington Smith, reviewing the mission's history in December 1918, recalled that Northcliffe's arrival had been "followed by what I may describe as a Canadian invasion. It was headed by Sir Charles Gordon, who had already rendered great services to the empire in the organization of munitions supply in Canada". After the Armistice he was charged, with Sir Hardman Lever and the United States War Industries Board, with cancelling the ministry's American contracts, and in January 1919 he was appointed liquidator of its United States contracts.

Gordon was among the first appointees to the Order of the British Empire, and Canadian newspapers reported that he was the first Canadian to receive the new honour: he was created a Knight Commander (KBE) on 24 August 1917, as "Representative of the Ministry of Munitions in the United States of America", and was promoted to Knight Grand Cross (GBE) in the 1918 Birthday Honours as vice-chairman of the British War Mission to the United States.

== Post-war public service ==
The opening session of the Genoa Conference in the Palazzo San Giorgio, April 1922; Gordon headed the Canadian delegation

In November 1918 Gordon succeeded Lloyd Harris as acting chairman of the Canadian War Mission in Washington, the Canadian government's pre-legation representation in the United States, a post he held until 31 March 1921. (Note: Contemporary sources differ on the sequence. The Canadian Annual Review for 1918 states that Frank A. Rolph succeeded Harris as chairman on 8 November 1918, and a United States government handbook of 1919 lists Rolph as chairman from 15 November 1918 to 15 January 1919 and Gordon as acting chairman from 15 February 1919. In May 1919 the president of the Privy Council, N. W. Rowell, told the Commons that the mission continued "with Sir Charles Gordon as acting chairman".) At the end of July 1919 he was still splitting his time between Dominion Textile and the British Ministry of Munitions' office in New York. He also took on the chairmanship of the Canadian Trade Commission, created by order-in-council on 6 December 1918 to find outlets for Canadian exports in a Europe rebuilding after the war, working alongside Harris, who ran the parallel Canadian Trade Mission in London. Gordon and Harris urged Ottawa to offer $50 million in credits to each of Romania, Serbia and Greece for the purchase of Canadian goods, but the Department of Finance halved the credits for Romania and Greece and refused Serbia, and Gordon's idea of a credit corporation, backed jointly by the government and the banks, to promote trade got an equally timid reception. In March 1920 the commission was also given control of import and export licences for sugar, and the following month the government announced that it was being wound up and its permanent work transferred to the Department of Trade and Commerce. (Note: The Dictionary of Canadian Biography states that Prime Minister Arthur Meighen closed the commission in 1921.)

After the Liberal victory in the election of December 1921, Montreal supporters of the party pressed Gordon's claims to the post of High Commissioner in London. The new prime minister, Mackenzie King, who noted in his diary that Gordon represented "the high protectionist & wealth" and was "not at all the man I could trust there alone", appointed Peter Larkin instead, and in February 1922 offered Gordon over lunch the leadership of Canada's delegation to the Genoa Conference on the economic and financial reconstruction of Europe; King recorded that Gordon "was much pleased with the offer". Gordon and the economist Édouard Montpetit were named as Canada's delegates that month, with power to sign treaties on Canada's behalf, and the conference met in April and May. The Progressive leader, T. A. Crerar, told the Commons that he regretted the appointment of a man "well known as a high protectionist" to an economic conference, and the government's instructions asked the delegates not to intervene in purely European questions but to "interest yourselves in such questions as are of economic concern to Canada". Covering the conference for the Toronto Daily Star, the young Ernest Hemingway described the Canadians as "the best dressed delegation" and Gordon, its head, as "blond, ruddy-faced and a little ill at ease". Canada's part in the proceedings was slight, but Gordon told the London press afterwards that "it was a good thing that Canada was represented", since "the interdependence of the nations of the world in trade is so great that it was just as important to Canada as to any other country that the European situation should be straightened out". King, receiving the delegates' report in October, thought Gordon "an able man".

== Bank of Montreal ==
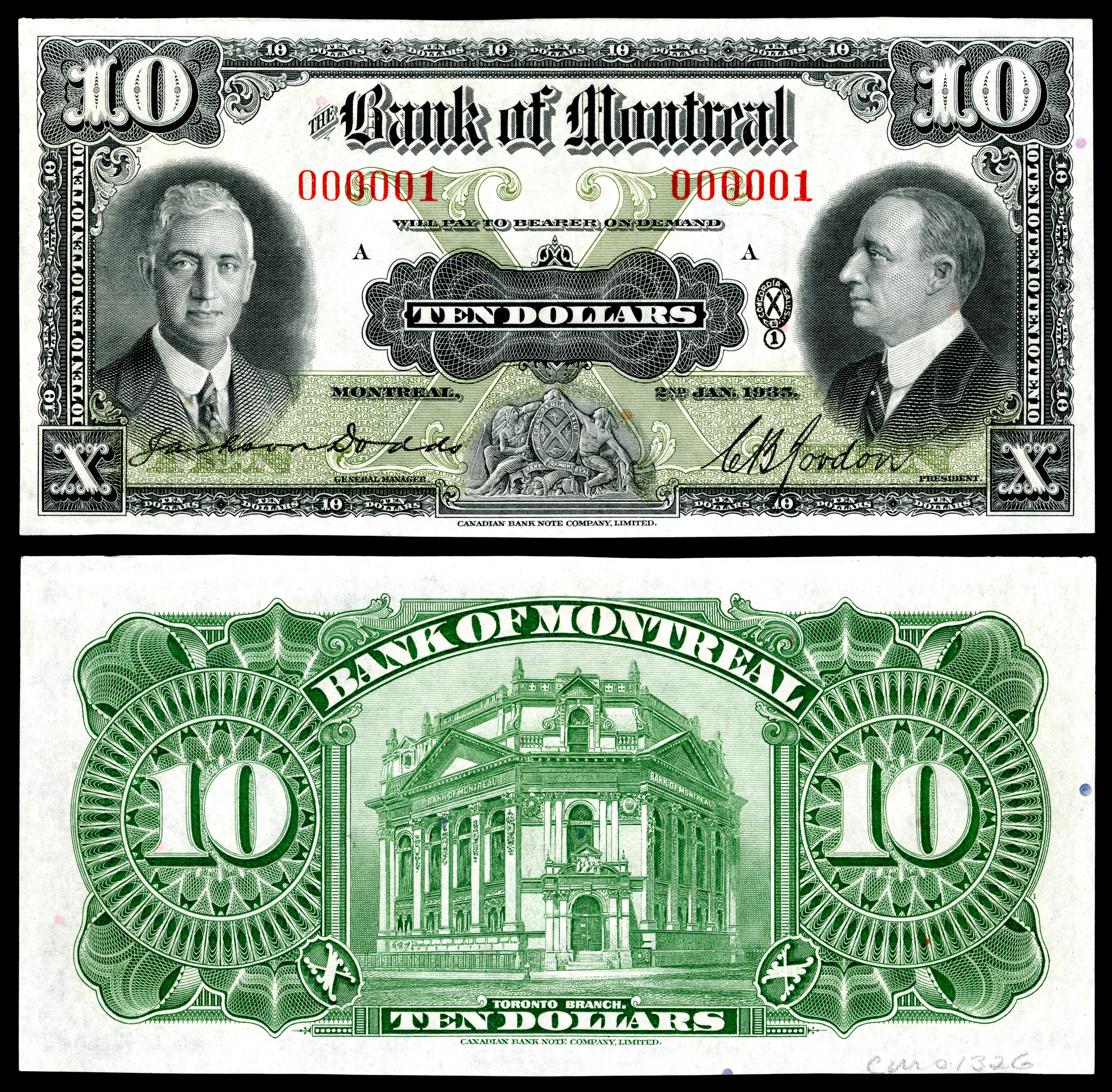
Bank of Montreal $10 note dated 2 January 1935, bearing the portraits and signatures of the general manager, Jackson Dodds (left), and of Gordon as president (right)

Gordon had been a director of the Bank of Montreal since 1912 and was elected one of its vice-presidents in December 1916. At a meeting of the directors that followed the bank's 110th annual general meeting on 5 December 1927 he was elected president in succession to Sir Vincent Meredith, who became chairman of the board and of its executive committee, and he remained president until his death. The Financial Post, contrasting the courtly and cautious Meredith with his successor, described Gordon as taciturn and reserved, "primarily the shrewd business man, conquering obstacles quietly and without emotion", and as a man who was "exceedingly embarrassed when his name is connected with charitable or public work". On taking up the office he gave up the presidency of Dominion Textile to Daniels, who formally succeeded him in 1928, though Gordon remained chairman of the company's board until 1933. The bank's historian Merrill Denison called Gordon "one of the most energetic presidents in its history"; he took the trouble to know personally the managers of every important branch, at home and overseas. His first address to the shareholders, in December 1928, after a tour of the West, argued that "the one thing Canada needs at present is people" and called for an immigration policy that would add at least 350,000 to the population each year. At the annual meeting held after the Wall Street crash of 1929 he followed the consensus of the day, telling shareholders that "fundamental conditions are sound, and there is no reason for apprehension as to the ultimate future of Canada", and a year later he assured them that "in this virile country of Canada with its abounding resources there can be no permanent depression". He was also president of the Royal Trust Company, the bank's associated trust company, and from February 1929 a director of the Canadian Pacific Railway, joining its executive committee that May in the place of Meredith. In the autumn of 1930 the Montreal Herald, answering an American list of the men who "rule America", named him one of the twenty-two "real rulers" of Canada. (Note: Trusts and Estates dated the Herald's list to 1922; contemporary reports place it in October 1930, when it was compiled in answer to James W. Gerard's list of sixty-four "men who rule America".)

Gordon at the time of his election as president of the bank, December 1927

During the Depression Gordon chaired the management committees of bankers and investment dealers that the minister of finance appointed to handle the Dominion government's 1931 conversion loan, which refunded some $638 million of war debt, the National Service Loan of November 1931, which raised $221 million, and the 4 per cent loan of 1932. His annual addresses became a platform for financial orthodoxy. In December 1931 he called Britain's forced abandonment of the gold standard "the most momentous event of the year" and warned provinces and municipalities that "any extravagance in expenditure, under the excuse of unemployment relief" would bring appeals for loans that might not be forthcoming, and in December 1932, as agitation for monetary reform grew, he told the shareholders that "there is no need of a central bank in Canada", since the Finance Act already served the purpose, and that "the shore of financial history is strewn with wrecks of ventures in irredeemable paper money". After the Macmillan royal commission on banking and currency recommended a central bank in 1933 he confined himself to warning of its cost and of "the probability that the bank would always be under the control of a political party", and once the Bank of Canada had been created he pledged the bank's co-operation while complaining that the new legislation would lessen the commercial banks' earnings. On social policy he was less conservative: in January 1934 he wrote privately to Prime Minister R. B. Bennett of "the urgent desirability of invoking some system of unemployment insurance" in place of municipal relief, and that December he told the shareholders that those who had thought old-age pensions and unemployment insurance—"misnamed the dole"—went too far had been mistaken, and that the governments of Canada and the United States would have to legislate before the problem got "out of hand".

In 1933, at the depth of the Depression, the Bank of Montreal led the syndicate of Canadian banks that advanced $60 million to the Canadian Pacific Railway to meet its maturing obligations, on the strength of a letter of 31 May 1933 from Bennett to Gordon promising a government guarantee of principal and interest. The loan and the wider question of interlocking directorates were examined in 1934 by the House of Commons Select Standing Committee on Banking and Commerce during its consideration of the Bank Act revision and the bill creating the Bank of Canada. Called before the committee on 19 April 1934, Gordon acknowledged that fifteen directors of the bank also sat on the board of the Royal Trust, of which he was likewise president, but insisted that the two institutions were run entirely separately and that the trust company was not an "adjunct" of the bank in the manner of the securities affiliates of the New York banks; he told the committee that he was "in no rings, or cabals, or anything of that description", that Dominion Textile—"my baby, as it were"—of which he had then been president for twenty-nine years, "does not owe the Bank of Montreal one cent", and that "I am not a high tariff man ... and never have been", although the textile industry could not stand "any heavy cut in the tariff". Asked by a committee member why the bank insisted on security for the CPR loan, the railway's president, Sir Edward Beatty, replied: "Sir Charles Gordon is Scotch."

In March 1935 King learned that he, Beatty, Herbert Molson and other Montreal financiers had sounded him out, through the bank's director Thomas Ahearn, about heading a "national government"; King's caucus rejected the idea. That December Gordon hailed the result of the general election, in which "socialist propaganda, in whatever form it appeared, was utterly repudiated at the polls", as "the most important development in Canada since the Ottawa Agreements", and in December 1936 he condemned talk of repudiating provincial debts as "nothing more or less than a breach of contract". In his last address, in December 1938, he called on Canadians to relegate "our parochial squabbles to their rightfully subordinate place and, as a nation, face with a united front the great era to which the finger of destiny so unmistakably is pointing". King, planning the royal tour of 1939, declined to have the CPR's directors presented to the King at Quebec because three of them—Holt, Gordon and R. H. McMaster—were "three of the strongest opponents the Government has".

The bank's note issues of 1931, 1935 and 1938, printed by the Canadian Bank Note Company, all carried Gordon's portrait and signature as president: the notes dated 2 January 1931 and 2 January 1935 paired him with the general manager, Jackson Dodds, and those dated 3 January 1938 with Dodds's successor, George W. Spinney.

== Return to Dominion Textile ==
Daniels's death from cancer in 1933 brought Gordon back to the presidency of Dominion Textile, which then controlled 38 per cent of the Canadian cotton market—48 per cent including its affiliate Montreal Cottons—while continuing as president of the bank; his eldest son, G. Blair Gordon, became managing director. His routine was to be driven each morning to Dominion Textile, where he went through the accounts, and then to walk to the bank and spend the rest of the day there. By the 1930s, in Austin's judgement, he "was a financier, and not a manufacturer" who "left the details to others". During the Depression he closed three old mills but was determined not to lay off large numbers of workers, most of whom were instead put on three- or four-day weeks; the company cut wages by 10 to 12 per cent in April 1933, partly restored them in 1934 and returned them to the 1930 level in December 1936, and it expanded into rayon and automobile-tire cord. The company's returns to the Turgeon commission showed that Gordon, as president and then chairman, had drawn $25,000 a year from 1927 to 1931 and about $21,000 to $22,000 a year in the mid-1930s, and that in 1921 the company had paid him a bonus of $35,000 for his services in the years 1918 to 1921.

Protective tariffs remained central to the company's strategy. On 17 January 1936, after Ottawa had lowered duties on Japanese textiles, the company closed the rayon division of its Sherbrooke mill "indefinitely", throwing about 400 people out of work in mid-winter. The decision was Blair Gordon's, as managing director; he told the government that the mill would stay shut until Japanese competition was made impossible, and it reopened after eleven days, on 29 January. Mackenzie King, newly returned to office, saw the closure as "a clear case of the textiles working with the Tory party" and wrote in his diary that the government's fight was "for the people against the special interests, and that those special interests centre around Sir Charles Gordon, the President of the Bank of Montreal, and his son, who are identified with these textile interests"; over the reservations of some ministers he had the order-in-council of 27 January 1936 appointing Justice William Ferdinand Alphonse Turgeon to head a Royal Commission on the Textile Industry drafted to make that connection clear, and the Speech from the Throne cited the closure as grounds for state intervention in industry. The commission sat for 135 days from March 1936. Blair Gordon was its principal witness for the company and Gordon himself did not testify, but commission counsel attacked his 1936 report to the shareholders, which had complained that governments were "the real preferred shareholders" and warned of "considerable curtailment" of operations in Quebec, reminding the commission that its author had that year drawn "a dividend at the rate of 150% per annum on his original investment". Turgeon's report, dated January 1938, found that the closure had been "hasty action ... calculated to impress the Government" and "the act of one man, the managing director"; it dismissed the industry's complaints, criticized the company's reliance on tariffs, its "secret reserves" and the returns on the 1905 syndicate's stock, and documented low wages, poor working conditions and hostility to trade unions, and the affair soured the company's labour relations for decades. The report was taken up in Parliament, where Maxime Raymond cited the 150 per cent returns of Gordon and Holt, and Gordon's salary and bonus, in 1939 as "an illustration of the manner in which the worker is despoiled". In August 1937 some 9,000 employees of Dominion Textile and Montreal Cottons struck for recognition of the Catholic textile federation; the company, acting through Blair Gordon, closed its mills and refused a collective agreement until an appeal by Cardinal Villeneuve and the mediation of Premier Maurice Duplessis produced a settlement at Quebec on 27 August, and it renounced the resulting contract the following spring. By Gordon's death in 1939 Dominion Textile employed more than 6,000 workers and held assets of some $50 million.

== Personal life ==
Terra Nova, the Gordons' house on Queen Mary Road, photographed by Wm. Notman & Son in 1906

On 19 April 1897 Gordon married Edith Annie Brooks, who had been his secretary. Born at Exeter, Ontario, on 4 June 1874, she was the second of the nine children of George Brooks, a commercial traveller later of Seaforth, Ontario, and Elizabeth Agnes Worden, and was educated at the Seaforth Collegiate Institute; her sisters included the physicist Harriet Brooks and Elizabeth Brooks, who married the McGill physicist Arthur Stewart Eve. Gordon was a witness at Harriet Brooks's wedding to Frank Pitcher in London in July 1907. They had three sons: George Blair Gordon (born 1900), who joined Dominion Textile in 1923, became its managing director in 1933, succeeded his father as president in 1939 and was chairman of the board from 1961; Charles Howard Gordon (born 1902), an engineer trained at the Royal Military College and McGill, who in 1948 helped to found the Montreal contractors Pentagon Construction and was its president and later chairman; and John Gordon, a McGill science graduate of 1926, who became a partner in the investment house McTaggart, Hannaford, Birks and Gordon. The family lived at "Terra Nova" on Queen Mary Road (then St. Luke Road) in Côte-des-Neiges, a neoclassical villa with a broad veranda that George Browne had designed in 1848 for the brewer John Molson Jr. and that the Molson family kept until Gordon acquired it; Lovell's directory lists Gordon in the village of Notre-Dame-des-Neiges from 1899 and at Terra Nova from 1900. Harriet Brooks and her husband, Frank Pitcher, lived on the neighbouring lot from 1909, and the two properties, nine acres in all, were run as a single estate without fences. The house passed to the corporation of Saint Joseph's Oratory at the end of the 1930s and since 1955 has housed the choir school of the Petits Chanteurs du Mont-Royal. (Note: The City of Montreal's heritage inventory of the Site patrimonial du Mont-Royal gives the date of the Oratory's acquisition of Terra Nova as 28 June 1938 in one place and 28 June 1939 in another.)

The Gordons' three sons, Blair, Howard and John, photographed by Wm. Notman & Son in 1906

Gordon was a keen sportsman who belonged to yachting, golf and tennis clubs; he was a member of the Mount Royal Club, the Montreal Hunt, the Montreal Jockey Club, the Royal Montreal Golf Club, the Senneville Golf Club, the Royal St. Lawrence Yacht Club, the Racquet and Tennis Club of New York and the Bath Club in London. He was a governor of McGill University from 1910–11 until his death and sat on the governors' finance committee; he subscribed $10,000 to the university's endowment campaign of 1911 and served on its executive committee, and in 1920 he was vice-chairman, with W. M. Birks, of the executive of the $5 million centennial endowment campaign, to which he gave $25,000 and Dominion Textile $100,000. He was also a governor of the Royal Victoria Hospital, chairman in 1928 of the Financial Federation, the Protestant federated charities appeal of Montreal, honorary treasurer of the Dominion Drama Festival from its foundation, and a director of the Canadian National Committee for Mental Hygiene, and in October 1932 Bishop's University conferred on him the honorary degree of Doctor of Civil Law.

The Mohican, later Gordon's Norseman, photographed before her First World War service in the United States Navy

Sailing was, in the words of the London illustrated weekly The Sphere, his "keenest interest". Before the First World War his yacht was the Semiramis, a wooden steam yacht of 85 tons built at Morris Heights, New York, in 1903, which Lloyd's Register of Yachts listed under his name from 1912 to 1919 and in which the family cruised the lower St. Lawrence. In 1925 the register listed him as the owner of the Mohican, a 325-ton steel auxiliary steam barquentine, 144 ft (44 m) long, built by Laird Brothers at Birkenhead in 1890 to a design by St. Clare Byrne. The yacht had a history of her own. Built as the Norseman for Samuel Radcliffe Platt of Oldham, a director of the Manchester Ship Canal Company, she was the first vessel of any size to enter the canal, through the Eastham locks in June 1891, and on 1 January 1894, with the company's directors on board, she led the procession of ships that opened it to traffic. Sold and renamed Lady Godiva, she later passed to American owners as the Mohican, and from June 1917 to February 1919 she served in the United States Navy as the armed patrol vessel USS Mohican (SP-117), a guard boat and kite balloon ship at the entrance to New York Harbor, on free lease from her owner, Robert P. Perkins of New York. Gordon soon sold her to another American owner, but in 1931 he bought her back, by then restored to her original name of Norseman, registered her at Glasgow and kept her until his death, cruising the west coast of Scotland; The Sphere pictured her at anchor at North Ballachulish in September 1937. The journalist Charles Vining, in his 1935 collection of sketches Bigwigs, described a man who "would rather entertain than be entertained", with a house in Montreal, a country place in the Laurentians at Ivry, a summer house on the lower St. Lawrence at Métis and a yacht, "all of which he uses for the edification of his friends", the chief activity at his weekend parties being "mild sessions of bridge at a quarter of a cent"; at the bank, Vining noted, he liked to wear a yellow sweater under a double-breasted grey flannel jacket. A Financial Post profile of 1924 observed that "'C.B.' ... is all that's heard around Dominion Textile offices. Nobody who works for him ever calls him Sir Charles".

Torridon House, Gordon's Scottish home from 1924, in an 1883 watercolour by Edward Gennys Fanshawe

In 1924 Gordon bought the Torridon estate in Wester Ross, in the Scottish Highlands, which the whisky magnate Lord Woolavington, who like him had been born in Canada, had put on the market in 1922. (Note: The Dictionary of Canadian Biography states that he had bought Torridon about a decade before 1922, and Finlay dates the purchase to 1925; but Lord Woolavington was still advertising the estate for sale in 1922, Whitaker's Peerage gave Torridon as his seat in 1923, and local histories date the sale to Gordon to 1924. The local histories name the vendor as Macdonald-Buchanan, that is Woolavington's son-in-law Reginald Macdonald-Buchanan, to whom the estate had evidently passed.) He spent many summers at Torridon House, and Scotland became one of the family's regular ports of call; when the family was not in residence the shooting was let, and in 1935 the 15,000-acre estate was advertised for the season with stags, grouse, salmon and sea fishing, a hard tennis court and a nine-hole golf course. After his death the estate was divided. Torridon House and its lands were sold in 1947 to R. G. Gunter and, after the Earls of Lovelace had acquired them in 1960, passed to the National Trust for Scotland in 1967; the family kept Wester Alligin, the western part of the estate, until 1968, when his sons Blair, Howard and John Gordon gave its 2,000 acres to the Trust in memory of their parents. (Note: The purchaser's name is given as Robert Geoffrey Gunter in a local history and as R. G. Gunter in other sources; one account calls him Richard Gunter.)

== Death and legacy ==
Gordon as the proprietor of his many enterprises, caricatured by A. G. Racey in Canadian Men of Affairs in Cartoon (1922)

Gordon returned to Montreal on 27 July 1939 from a business trip to England, on which he had been accompanied by Sir Edward Beatty. He felt unwell on arrival, was taken to the Ross Memorial Pavilion of the Royal Victoria Hospital on the morning of Saturday 29 July, and died there at ten o'clock the next morning, aged 71. Newspapers across Canada carried his death on their front pages; the lead editorial in the Montreal Gazette credited him with putting "the textile industry in Canada on its feet" and called him "a genuine patriot", and tributes came from Beatty, the bank's general managers and leading financiers. The Canadian Press described him as "another in the long list of men of Scottish blood who started life as a clerk and became a dominant figure in Canadian business and finance" and reported that he was "probably one of the three wealthiest men in Canada". The New York Times and The Times of London carried obituaries, and The Times printed appreciations, one of them by the bank's former general manager, Sir Frederick Williams-Taylor; the Financial Post, grouping him with Flavelle, Sir John Aird and other recently dead business leaders who had risen from humble beginnings, observed that "without waiting for the outbreak of war" Canada should be making greater use of such men. His funeral was held on 1 August at the Erskine and American United Church, drew hundreds of mourners from the worlds of business, finance and government, and he was buried in Mount Royal Cemetery. The Royal Trust Company, Lady Gordon and his three sons were named executors of his will. Lady Gordon, who had been president of the Women's Canadian Club of Montreal in 1921 and vice-president of the Protestant Infants' Home, survived him and died in 1956. According to Bennett's biographer P. B. Waite, the bank telephoned the former prime minister, newly settled in England, to ask whether he would consider the presidency; he declined, and Huntly Redpath Drummond was elected to succeed Gordon on 18 August 1939.

At his death Gordon was president of the Bank of Montreal, Dominion Textile, Dominion Glass, Hillcrest Collieries, Montreal Cottons, the Ritz-Carlton Hotel Company and the Royal Trust Company, chairman of Penmans and of the Canadian board of the Royal Exchange Assurance, vice-president of the Guarantee Company of North America, and a director of some two dozen other companies, among them the Canadian Pacific Railway, Consolidated Mining and Smelting, Dominion Steel and Coal Corporation, Montreal Light, Heat & Power, Canadian Industries Limited, Ogilvie Flour Mills, the Montreal Locomotive Works, the American Locomotive Company and the United States Rubber Company. His biographer Robert Craig Brown concluded that under his initiative and leadership Montreal became the capital of the Canadian cotton industry, and that as Flavelle's trusted colleague, "in the later stages of the war he was a key figure in Britain's munitions-purchasing program in North America". A street in Salaberry-de-Valleyfield, rue Gordon, is believed to commemorate him as president of the Montreal Cotton Company. He sat to the Montreal portrait painter Alphonse Jongers, and photographic portraits of Gordon, including a studio portrait of about 1913 and a copy made in 1928 by Wm. Notman & Son of a painted portrait, are held by the McCord Stewart Museum; a photograph taken by Blank and Stoller in March 1939 is preserved in the Dominion Textile fonds at Library and Archives Canada, and he was among the Montreal businessmen caricatured in A. G. Racey's Canadian Men of Affairs in Cartoon (1922).

== Honours ==
- Knight Commander of the Order of the British Empire (KBE), 24 August 1917
- Knight Grand Cross of the Order of the British Empire (GBE), 3 June 1918
- Honorary Doctor of Civil Law (D.C.L.), Bishop's University, 20 October 1932

== Notes ==
Diplomatic posts
Preceded by Lloyd Harris	Acting Chairman (Canadian War Mission) to the United States of America (pre-legation representation); 1918–1921	Succeeded by Merchant M. Mahoney
Business positions
Preceded by David Yuile	President of Dominion Textile; 1909–1928	Succeeded by Francis Galvin Daniels
Preceded by Francis Galvin Daniels	President of Dominion Textile; 1933–1939	Succeeded by George Blair Gordon
Preceded by Vincent Meredith	President of the Bank of Montreal; 1927–1939	Succeeded by Huntly Redpath Drummond
