= Cornerstone Building Brands =

U.S. manufacturing company

Cornerstone Building Brands, Inc.
- Type: Public company
- Traded as: NYSE: NCS
- Founded: 2018
- Headquarters: Cary, North Carolina
- Area served: North America
- Key people: Rose Lee (CEO)
- Products: Prefabricated metal buildings & components
- Services: metal coil coating, metal components, engineered building systems
- Revenue: ▲US$1.770 billion (2017)
- Total assets: ▲US$1.051 billion (2017)
- Total equity: ▲US$305.247 million (2017)
- Number of employees: 4,484 (2013)
- Website: www.cornerstonebuildingbrands.com

Cornerstone Building Brands, Inc. was formed when NCI Building Systems, Inc. merged with Ply Gem Parent, LLC in November 2018; the company is headquartered in Cary, North Carolina. Cornerstone Building Brands is the largest manufacturer of exterior building products in North America servicing the commercial, residential and repair & remodel markets.

Prior to the merger, NCI Building Systems Inc. was one of the largest manufacturers of metal products for the non-residential construction industry in North America. The company provided a broad range of products for repair, retrofit and new construction activities. It operated within three primary business segments: metal coil coating, metal components and engineered building systems.
