= Brantford City =

Former federal electoral district in Ontario, Canada

Ontario electoral district

Defunct federal electoral district
- Legislature: House of Commons
- District created: 1924
- District abolished: 1947
- First contested: 1925
- Last contested: 1945

Brantford City was a federal electoral district in Ontario, Canada, that was represented in the House of Commons of Canada from 1925 to 1949. This riding was created in 1924 from parts of Brantford riding.

It consisted initially of the City of Brantford (according to its 1914 boundaries) and the township of Oakland and the part of the township of Brantford lying south and west of the Grand River, in the county of Brant.

The electoral district was abolished in 1947 when it was merged into Brantford riding.

== Members of Parliament ==
This riding elected the following members of the House of Commons of Canada:

Parliament	Years	Member	Party
Riding created from Brantford
15th	1925–1926	Robert Edwy Ryerson	Conservative
16th	1926–1930	Robert Edwy Ryerson	Conservative
17th	1930–1935	Robert Edwy Ryerson	Conservative
18th	1935–1940	William Ross Macdonald	Liberal
19th	1940–1945	William Ross Macdonald	Liberal
20th	1945–1949	William Ross Macdonald	Liberal
Riding dissolved into Brantford

== Election results ==
1925 Canadian federal election
Party	Candidate	Votes
Conservative	Robert Edwy Ryerson	7,395
Liberal	William Gawtress Raymond	4,952

1926 Canadian federal election
Party	Candidate	Votes
Conservative	Robert Edwy Ryerson	7,070
Liberal	William Ross Macdonald	5,993

1930 Canadian federal election
Party	Candidate	Votes
Conservative	Robert Edwy Ryerson	9,154
Liberal	William Ross Macdonald	6,072

1935 Canadian federal election
Party	Candidate	Votes
Liberal	William Ross Macdonald	7,383
Conservative	Robert Edwy Ryerson	6,511
Co-operative Commonwealth	William John Cowherd	1,618
Reconstruction	Allan Kneale	1,202

1940 Canadian federal election
Party	Candidate	Votes
Liberal	William Ross Macdonald	8,013
National Government	Charles Eardley Wilmot	6,312
Co-operative Commonwealth	John Henry Matthews	1,315

1945 Canadian federal election
Party	Candidate	Votes
Liberal	William Ross Macdonald	8,670
Progressive Conservative	Walter James Dowden	6,988
Co-operative Commonwealth	Nelson Cox	2,437

== See also ==
- List of Canadian electoral districts
- Historical federal electoral districts of Canada
