= Ignatius Cockshutt =

Ignatius Cockshutt (August 24, 1812 – March 1, 1901) was a Canadian businessman and philanthropist. The son of James Cockshutt and Mary Nightingale, he was born in Bradford, Yorkshire, England, and the family moved to Canada in July 1827.

== Biography ==
His father established himself as a general merchant in York, and in 1829 opened a branch in Brantford, Canada West where Ignatius worked as a clerk. After a rocky start at the branch location, it was ultimately successful to the point that the York business was closed and the operation consolidated in Brantford.

In 1840, Ignatius and his sister Jane purchased the business from their father and operated it until 1846 when she withdrew. He operated the business very successfully until 1882 as his main occupation.

From 1847, he was the largest landowner in Brantford, and by 1880 he had 41 rental properties and 21 farms in addition to his own businesses and residence. He was a director of the Brantford and Buffalo Joint Stock Railway, though he lost his investment when the railroad went bankrupt. He was also involved in a toll road and gas and water companies in Brantford.

Along with his son James G. Cockshutt, in 1877 he founded the original Cockshutt factory, the Brantford Plow Works at Brantford, Ontario.

In 1882, the business was incorporated as the Cockshutt Plow Company, with James G. Cockshutt as president and Ignatius as vice-president. At that time, they employed about 50 workers. After James' death in 1885, the company was operated by three of Ignatius' sons in succession and by a Cockshutt family member until 1957, when outside interests gained control of the company.

He married Margaret Gemmel on September 22, 1846, with whom he had one child named Mary. Margaret died in 1847. Three years later, on September 9, 1850, he married Elizabeth Foster and had eight more surviving children with her. In total he had nine children that survived into adulthood, and three who died in infancy.

He interfered in the affairs of his adult children and their partners, including convincing doctors to have his son William F. Cockshutt declared mentally unstable, temporarily sending William to an asylum in New York because Ignatius disapproved of his intended wife. By contrast, he was affectionate with his dogs. He spent considerable time and money on various charitable and philanthropic causes, in keeping with his Inghamite Methodist convictions.
