= Robert Edwy Ryerson =

Canadian politician

Member of Parliament for Brantford City
- In office October 1925 – October 1935
- Preceded by: riding created
- Succeeded by: William Ross Macdonald

Personal details
- Born: Robert Edwy Ryerson; 12 August 1865 Brant County, Canada West
- Died: 12 October 1958 (aged 93)
- Party: Conservative
- Spouse(s): Elizabeth E. Dowling m. 21 August 1896
- Profession: Grocer, merchant

Robert Edwy Ryerson (12 August 1865 – 12 October 1958) was a Conservative member of the House of Commons of Canada. He was born in Brant County, Canada West and became a grocer and merchant.

Ryerson attended public school at Brantford. He became an associate manager of grocery firm Ryerson Brothers and served three terms as a Brantford alderman.

He was first elected to Parliament at the Brantford City riding in the 1925 general election and re-elected there in 1926 and 1930. Ryerson was defeated in the 1935 federal election by William Ross Macdonald of the Liberal party.
