= Jack Wratten =

Canadian politician

Member of Parliament for Brantford
- In office June 1957 – June 1962

Personal details
- Born: 30 July 1906 England
- Died: 24 August 1996 (aged 90) Brantford, Ontario, Canada
- Party: Progressive Conservative
- Profession: contractor

Jack Wratten (30 July 1906 – 24 August 1996) was a Progressive Conservative party member of the House of Commons of Canada. He was born in England and became a contractor by career.

He was first elected at the Brantford riding in the 1957 general election and served two terms until his defeat in the 1962 election.

During his second term in the House of Commons in 1961, Wratten attempted to establish a national holiday in honour of Canada's first Prime Minister by supporting a parliamentary bill. Had this become law, John A. Macdonald Day would have been observed each year on a Monday in mid-February. Macdonald's birthdate in January was deemed too soon after the Christmas and New Year's holiday period for this purpose.
