= David Yuile =

Canadian businessman

David Yuile (20 February 1846 – 21 June 1909) was a Canadian businessman. Yuile, along with his brother William, owned and operated various glass manufacturing companies through his life. He also served as the president of the Dominion Textile Company.

David was born February 20, 1846, in Glasgow, Scotland. His parents, William Pollock Yuile and Margaret Rattray had one son and one daughter already. His father was a wine merchant, and around 1857 his family emigrated to Canada West, settling around Ingersoll. David attended school there, later moving with his family to Montreal in 1869, where William Yuile, the family's eldest son, became a general merchant. David was hired on by William in 1870. As the business continued to prosper, the brothers also began to act as manufacturer's agents and wholesale druggists. In 1875 they were hired to act as the manufacturer's agent for the newly formed St Johns Glass Company of Saint-Jean, which they acquired on June 1, 1878, to cover debts owed to them, after the company's losses had forced its closure.

Yuile married Margaret King in June 1878 in Montreal. The Yuile brothers set to work restoring the St Johns Glass Company of Saint-Jean to operation, and it resumed manufacturing in April 1879 under the name Excelsior Glass Company. Although the business did well, the location in Saint-Jean-sur-Richelieu was inconvenient, and the brothers sold the building and land in 1880, and moved the manufacturing equipment and workers to Montreal. Two glass furnaces were erected at the Montreal site, one for flint glass and one for green glass, and the company made prescription bottles, fruit jars, telegraph insulators, and some pressed glass pieces. The brothers also acquired the Foster Brothers Glass Works the same year, and moved its operations to their Montreal factory. The company was reorganised in 1883 to finance further expansion and the hiring of expert European glass blowers. As part of the reorganisation, it was renamed the North American Glass Company. At this point, the company had a capital of $10,000.

David and William Yuile, along with Ralph King, the secretary-treasurer of North American Glass, and King's brother in law John Watt founded the Diamond Glass Company Limited in 1890. The company did not manufacture glass, but acquired glass producing companies in a plan to control the Canadian glass market by purchasing the glass manufacturing companies. The first company they acquired as their own North American Glass Company, and they also acquired the Nova Scotia Glass Company of New Glasgow, Nova Scotia in 1890. The company managed to increase its capital to $500,000 by 1891, and purchased the Hamilton Glass Company and the Burlington Glass Company. After this acquisitions slowed until the takeovers of the Lamont Glass Company and the Dominion Glass Company Limited in 1897 and the Toronto Glass Company Limited in 1899. During the 1890s, Yuile served as president of the Chanteloup Manufacturing Company Limited, a Montreal-based brass foundry and ironworks.

William Yuile retired in 1903, and the Diamond Glass Company was reorganised to allow further expansion. A new ownership group of previous owners David Yuile and Ralph King, as well as new owners Norman MacLeod Yuile (son of William Yuile), James Watt King (Ralph's brother), George Arthur Grier, and David Alexander Gordon started the new Diamond Flint Glass Company Limited, with David acting as the secretary-treasurer from February onwards and president from August onwards. The Diamond Flint Glass Company bought the Diamond Glass Company for $1,938,309. At this time the Diamond Flint Glass Company was the largest glass manufacturer in Canada, employing some one thousand people. Yuile helped organise the formation of the Dominion Textile Company in 1905 from several smaller cotton mills, and was elected the president of the firm upon its creation, with Charles Blair Gordon, who succeeded him as president in 1909, as its managing director. In 1906 the Diamond Flint Glass Company obtained exclusive rights to the use of the Owens automatic bottle machine in Canada. Yuile was made a member of the Montreal Board of Trade in 1908. Yuile remained president of the Diamond Flint Glass Company until his death on June 21, 1909, in Johns Hopkins Hospital in Baltimore, Maryland, where he had travelled to undergo an operation.
