= List of Molson Coors brands =

Molson Coors was created by the merger of two of North America's largest breweries: Molson of Canada, and Coors of the United States, on February 9, 2005. Molson Coors acquired full ownership of the Miller brand portfolio from SABMiller in 2016. Through this acquisition and others, Molson Coors owns a number of notable beverage brands including Blue Moon, Carling, Coors Banquet, Coors Light, George Killian's Irish Red, Granville Island Brewing, Hamm's, Hop Valley, Leinenkugel's, Miller High Life, Miller Lite, Milwaukee's Best, Molson Canadian, Molson Export, Steel Reserve, and Terrapin.

Product availability and trademark registration vary by country. In certain countries, Molson Coors Beverage Company may distribute the products under license from a third party.

== Molson Coors North America ==
- Aquarelle (A vodka-based canned drink introduced exclusively to the Canadian market in 2020.)
- Arnold Palmer Spiked Half & Half
- Bella Amari
- Black Horse
- Black Ice
- Blue Moon / Belgian Moon
  - Blue Moon Light
- Bohemian
- Cape Line Sparkling Cocktails
- Carling
- Clearly Kombucha
- Colorado Native
  - Winterfest
- Cool
- Coors
  - Coors Banquet / Coors Original
  - Coors Batch 19
  - Coors Edge
  - Coors Light
  - Coors Organic
  - Coors Seltzer
  - Extra Gold Lager
- Creemore Springs
- Crispin Cider
- Dominion Ale
- Foster's
- George Killian's Irish Red
- Granville Island Brewing
- Hamm's
- Henry Weinhard's
  - Henry Weinhard’s Gourmet Sodas
  - Henry's Hard Soda
- Herman Joseph's Private Reserve
- Hop Valley
- India Beer
- Keystone
  - Keystone Light
  - Keystone Ice
- Laurentide
- Leinenkugel's
- Mad & Noisy
- Mad Jack
- Miller Brewing Company
  - Icehouse
  - Magnum
  - Mickey's
  - Miller Genuine Draft
  - Miller High Life
  - Miller Lite
  - Miller64
  - Milwaukee's Best
  - Olde English 800
  - Steel Reserve
- Molson
  - Molson Canadian
  - Molson Canadian Cold Shots
  - Molson Dry
  - Molson Exel
  - Molson Export
  - Molson Golden
  - Molson Stock Ale
  - Molson Ultra
- MOVO
- Old Style Pilsner
- Old Vienna
- Red Dog
- Redd's
  - Redd's Apple Ale/Redd's Hard Apple
  - Redd's Wicked
- Revolver Brewing
- Rickards
- Saint Archer Brewing
  - Saint Archer
  - Saint Archer Gold
- Smith & Forge Hard Cider
- Sol Cerveza
- Sparks
- Standard Lager
- Terrapin Beer Company
- Vizzy Hard Seltzer
- Wanderoot

=== Bavaria Brewery ===
The following brands became a part of SAB Miller's portfolio in 2005, upon SAB Miller's acquisition of Bavaria Brewery. SAB Miller began importing these brands to limited regions of the United States from Colombia and Peru in January 2007. Upon AB InBev's acquisition of SAB Miller, Bavaria became a fully owned subsidiary of AB InBev.

- Aguila (Colombia)
- Cristal (Peru)
- Cusqueña (Peru)

=== Former brands ===
==== Atwater Brewery ====
Detroit-based Atwater Brewery was founded in 1997. It is the largest craft brewery in Detroit and the fourth largest craft brewery in Michigan.

Tenth and Blake Beer Company, the craft brewery division of Molson Coors, acquired Atwater Brewery in 2020.

At its peak, Atwater Brewery distributed products in over twenty states. By the time of its acquisition by Molson Coors, the brewery had scaled back distribution to focus on the Midwest market. By 2021, the brand was available in Michigan, Indiana, Ohio, Wisconsin, Pennsylvania and Tennessee. That same year, it expanded into Illinois.

In August 2024, Atwater Brewery, along with Hop Valley Brewing Company, Terrapin Beer Co., and Revolver Brewing, was sold by Molson Coors to Tilray.

== Molson Coors Europe ==
- Apatinsko
- Aspall Cyder
- AstikA
  - Astika Dark
  - Astika Light
  - Burgasko
- Barmen
- Bergenbier
  - Bergenbier Non-Alcoholic
- Borsodi
- Caffreys
- Cobra Beer
- Franciscan Well
- Jelen
- Kamenitza
  - Kamenitza Non-Alcoholic
- Lech Premium
- La Sagra
  - Madrí
  - Burro de Sancho
- Niksicko
- Noroc
- Ostravar
- Ozujsko
- Pardubice
  - Pernstejn
  - Porter
  - Taxis
- Rekorderlig
- Sharp's Brewery
- Staropramen Brewery
  - Pravha
  - Staropramen
  - Staropramen Non-Alcoholic
- Tomislav
- Worthingtons
- WAI Moment (hard seltzer)

== Discontinued ==
- Aspen Edge
- Blair's Bavarian Beer
- Coors Malted Milk (non-alcoholic, formula later acquired by Mars Candy)
- Coors Red Light
- Coors Dry (western US only)
- Coors Artic Ice [sic]
- Coors Cutter (non-alcoholic)
- Eisbock (seasonal - spring)
- Miller Fortune
- Miller Lite Ice
- Miller Gold
- Molson Canadian 67
- Molson M
- Screamers
- Southpaw Light
- Turbo 1000
- Weizenbier
- Red Dog
- Zima
