= Molson Brewery =

Canadian alcohol brewery

Molson Coors Canada Inc.
- Formerly: Molson's Limited (1930–1963); Molson Breweries Limited (1963–1968); Molson Industries Limited (1968–1973); The Molson Companies Limited (1973–1999); Molson, Inc. (1999–2005)
- Type: Public subsidiary
- Traded as: TSX: TPX.A; TSX: TPX.B; TSX: MOL (until 2005)
- Industry: Beverages
- Founded: 1786; 240 years ago
- Founder: John Molson
- Headquarters: Montreal, Quebec, Canada
- Products: Beer
- Number of employees: 3,000
- Parent: Molson Coors Beverage Company
- Website: Molson.ca

Final logo as Molson, used until 2005.

Molson Coors Canada Inc. is a Canada-based brewery based in Montreal and was established in 1786 by the Molson family. In 2005, Molson merged with the Adolph Coors Company to become Molson Coors.

Molson Coors maintains some of its Canadian operations at the site of Molson's first brewery located on the Saint Lawrence River in Montreal. The Montreal brewery closed in 2021, after over 200 years of service.

== History ==
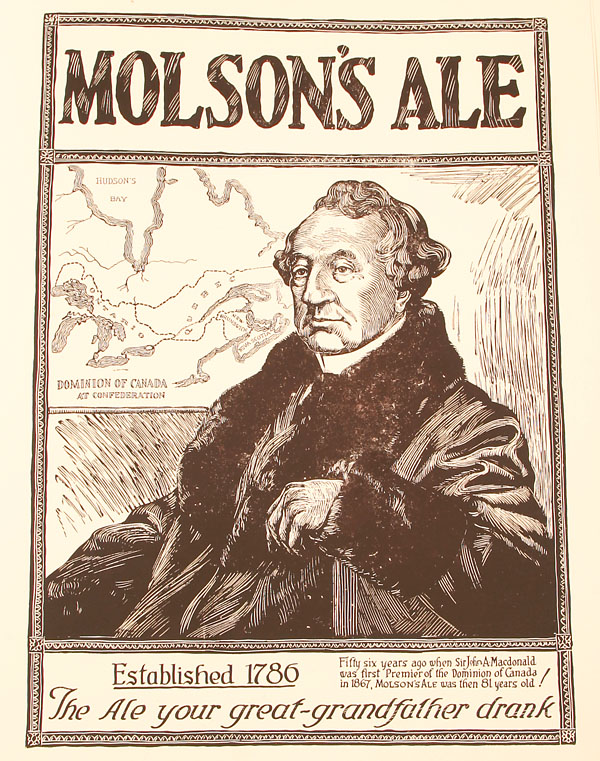
1924 advertisement; "Fifty six years ago when Sir John A. Macdonald was first premier of the Dominion of Canada in 1867, MOLSON'S ALE was then 81 years old!"

Founded in 1786, the Molson Brewery is one of the oldest breweries in North America and continues to produce beer on the original brewery site.

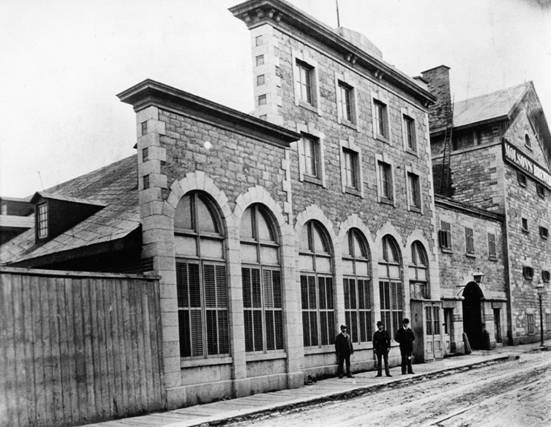
Molson Brewery, c. 1885

On May 2, 1782, John Molson, age 18, left England for Canada, landing in Montreal on June 26. Shortly after his arrival, he began working at the Thomas Loyd brewery. In 1784, Molson sued Thomas Loyd for repayment of a debt. The result was Loyd admitted that he owed the debt and all of his brewery buildings were put up for auction. Around this time, Molson sensed the market potential for beer in the British colony. Prices for wine, rum, and port were rising and an influx of English and Irish immigrants were particularly partial to beer. In January 1785, Molson used the money inherited from his parents to acquire what had been the Thomas Loyd brewery on the shores of the St. Lawrence, just outside the fortifications of the burgeoning City of Montreal.

In June 1785, he temporarily closed his business to cross the Atlantic for modern equipment and ingredients. Upon his return, he offered the seeds free of charge to neighboring Montreal farmers, who agreed to grow them to satisfy the brewery's need for malt. In 1786, just six weeks after taking the helm, Molson delivered his first brew, an ale. Priced at five cents a bottle, his brew sold well.

Molson took advantage of the many business opportunities available at the time. He quickly diversified his investments, opened a lumber yard, and began issuing loans to local Montreal merchants. In 1816, the family enterprise began to take shape when founder John Molson entered into an association with his three sons, John Jr., Thomas and William.

Although brewing proved to be Molson's most sustainable field of endeavour, other activities were added throughout the company's lengthy history. Molson was the first company to own and operate a fleet of steamboats, which were used to transport people and goods between Quebec and Ontario. John Molson and his sons also founded the Molson Bank, which later merged with the Bank of Montreal.

Thomas Molson would eventually follow in his father's footsteps by continuing the Molson brewing tradition and upholding high standards of quality. In 1903, inspired by the popularity of imported beers, Thomas’ grandson Herbert Molson and brewmaster John Hyde created Molson Export, an authentic ale brewed in the classic style, developed by John Molson.

The Molson family were pioneers in steamships and hospitality, assisted with the Montreal General Hospital, were patrons of McGill University and the arts, and until 1925, were involved in banking through Molson Bank which merged with the Bank of Montreal.

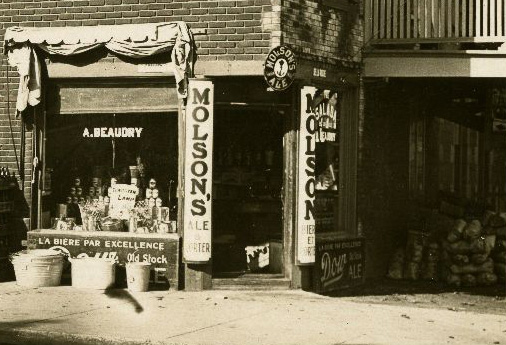
Store in Montreal with advertising for Molson Brewery, 1910

Molson Brewery expanded the breadth of its corporate activities throughout the 20th century. In 1945, the family decided to transform the company into a public, limited-liability enterprise. It then became possible to acquire ownership in the company without being a member of the Molson family. This made it possible for the company to expand into lager and inaugurate a new brewery in Toronto (near the Canadian National Exhibition) in 1955. The Crown and Anchor brand of beer dates from this time. Two years later in 1957, the family (not the firm) acquired the Montreal Forum and the Montreal Canadiens. The company continued to develop and, in 1958, acquired six breweries, which included five establishments in Western Canada, giving Molson a nationwide presence. In 1989, the company consolidated market share in Quebec through a merger with Carling O'Keefe (acquiring Carling's Toronto brewery in Etobicoke). As a result, Molson became the largest brewery in Canada and the fifth largest in the world.

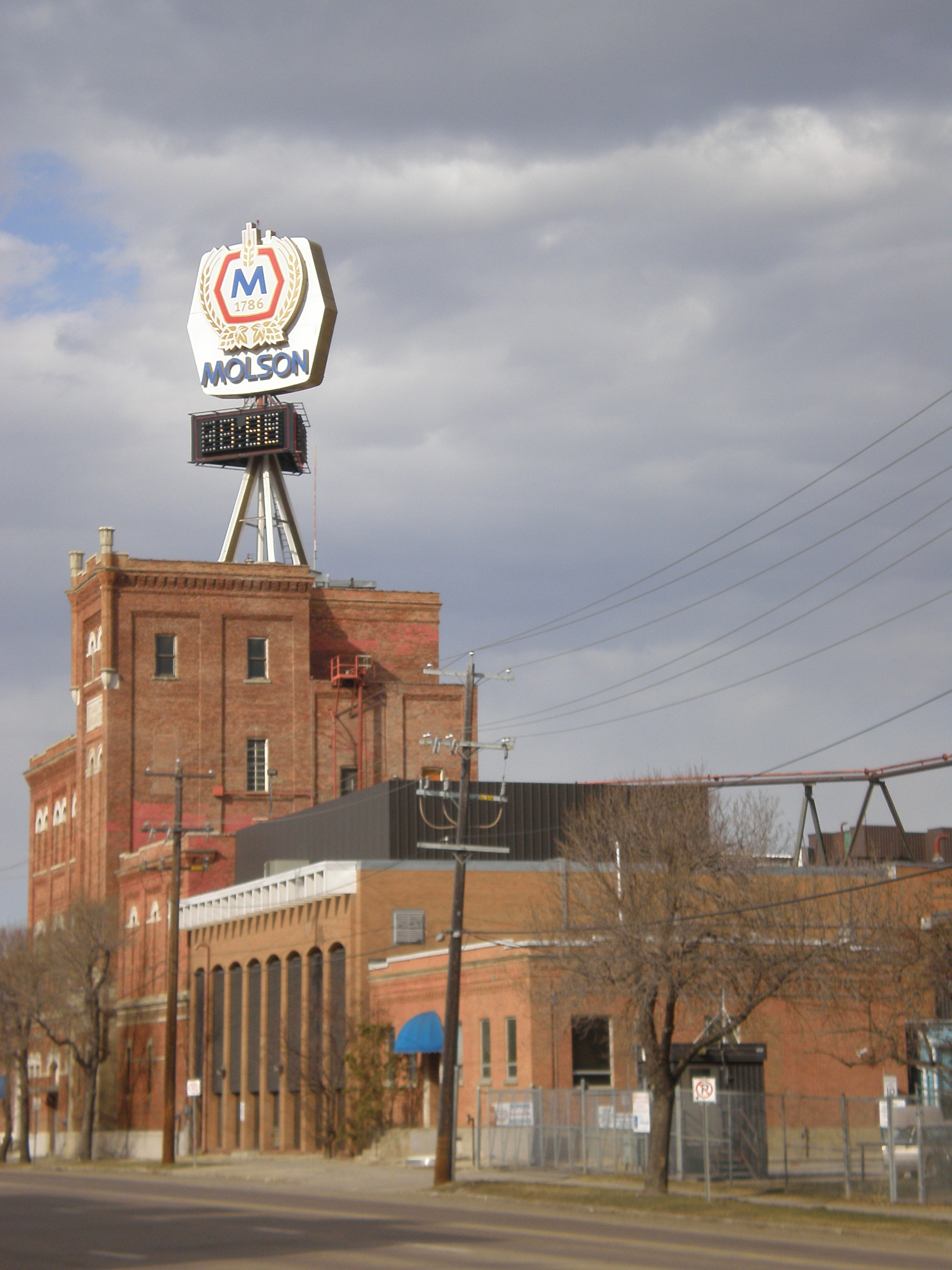
Former Molson Brewery in Edmonton, Alberta, Canada

Molson was once the owner of home improvement chains Beaver Lumber and Aikenhead's Home Improvement Warehouse. In February 1994, Molson sold a 75% interest in Aikenhead's to Home Depot Inc for $150 million with the option to buy the rest in 1999; in the event, they agreed on a price of $262 million. In 1997, Molson sold for CAD$147 million their interest in Reno-Depot to Castorama. In 1999 they sold Beaver Lumber to Home Hardware.

In 2005, Molson merged with US-based Coors to form Molson Coors Brewing Company. This was followed in 2007 by the opening of a new brewery in Moncton, New Brunswick. Sixth-generation family member Eric Molson retired in 2009; however, his sons Andrew and Geoff Molson continue to be active in company affairs as members of the corporate Board of Directors.

On October 11, 2016, SABMiller in the U.S. sold its interests (from the joint venture formed in the United States and Puerto Rico) in MillerCoors to Molson Coors, who had been its partner in the joint venture, for around US$12 billion. Molson Coors gained full ownership of the Miller brand portfolio outside of the U.S. and Puerto Rico, and retained the rights to all of the brands that were in the MillerCoors portfolio for the U.S. and Puerto Rico.

In 2018, the company brewed and marketed a number of the most popular brands of beer in Canada. Domestic labels include Molson Canadian, Molson M, Molson Export, Molson Dry, Molson Exel Dealcoholized beer, Old Style Pilsner, Rickard's, Creemore Springs, and Granville Island Brewing. Through partnerships with other major brewers, Molson Coors Canada also offers beer brands, including Coors Light, Miller Genuine Draft, Heineken, Foster's Lager, and Tiger. Molson employs 3,000 people in Canada and operates five breweries in locations across the country (Chilliwack, Toronto, Montreal, Moncton, and St. John's), as well as former micro-breweries Creemore Springs in Ontario and Granville Island Brewing in British Columbia.

== Operations ==
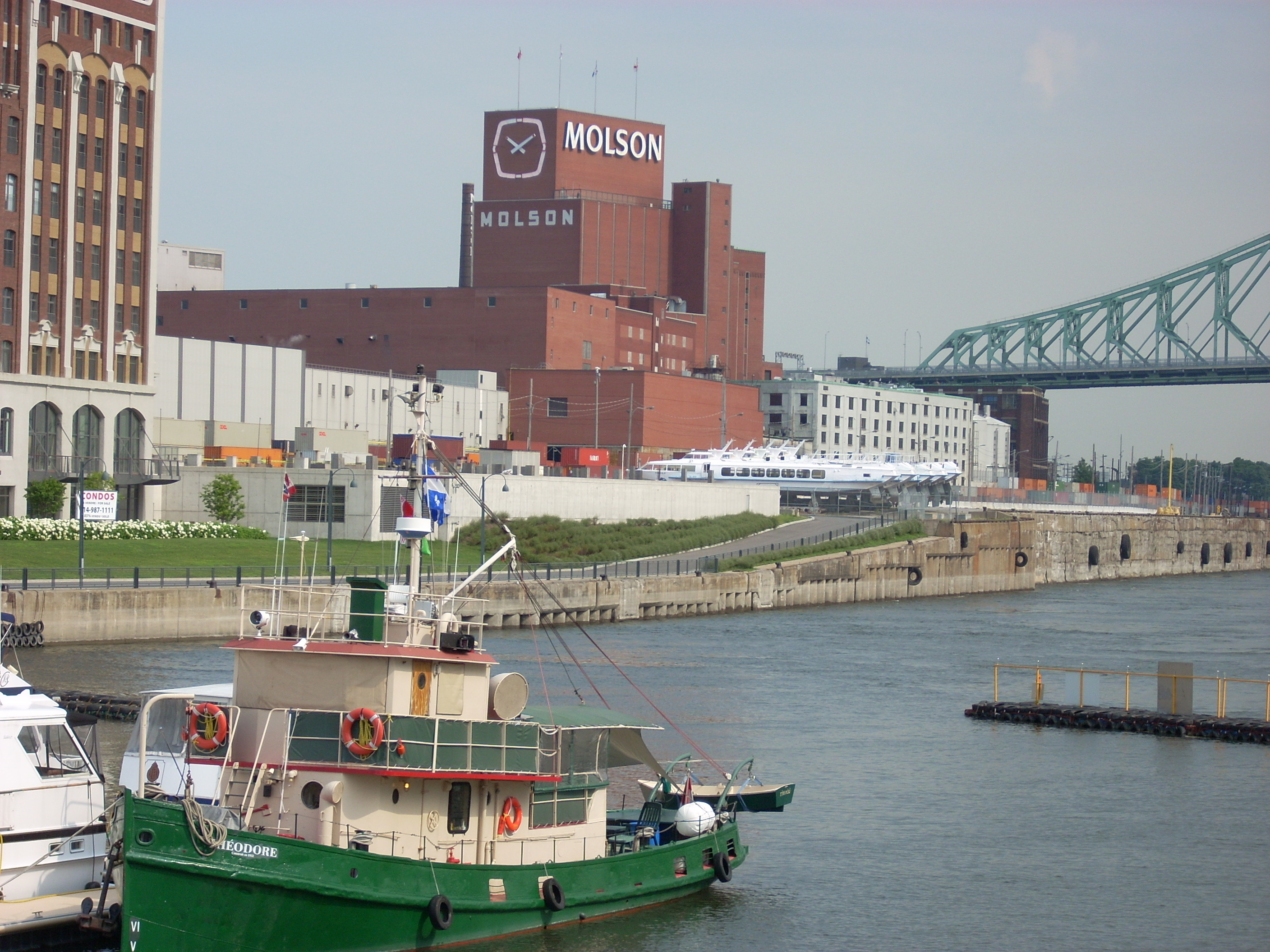
Former Molson brewery in Old Montreal

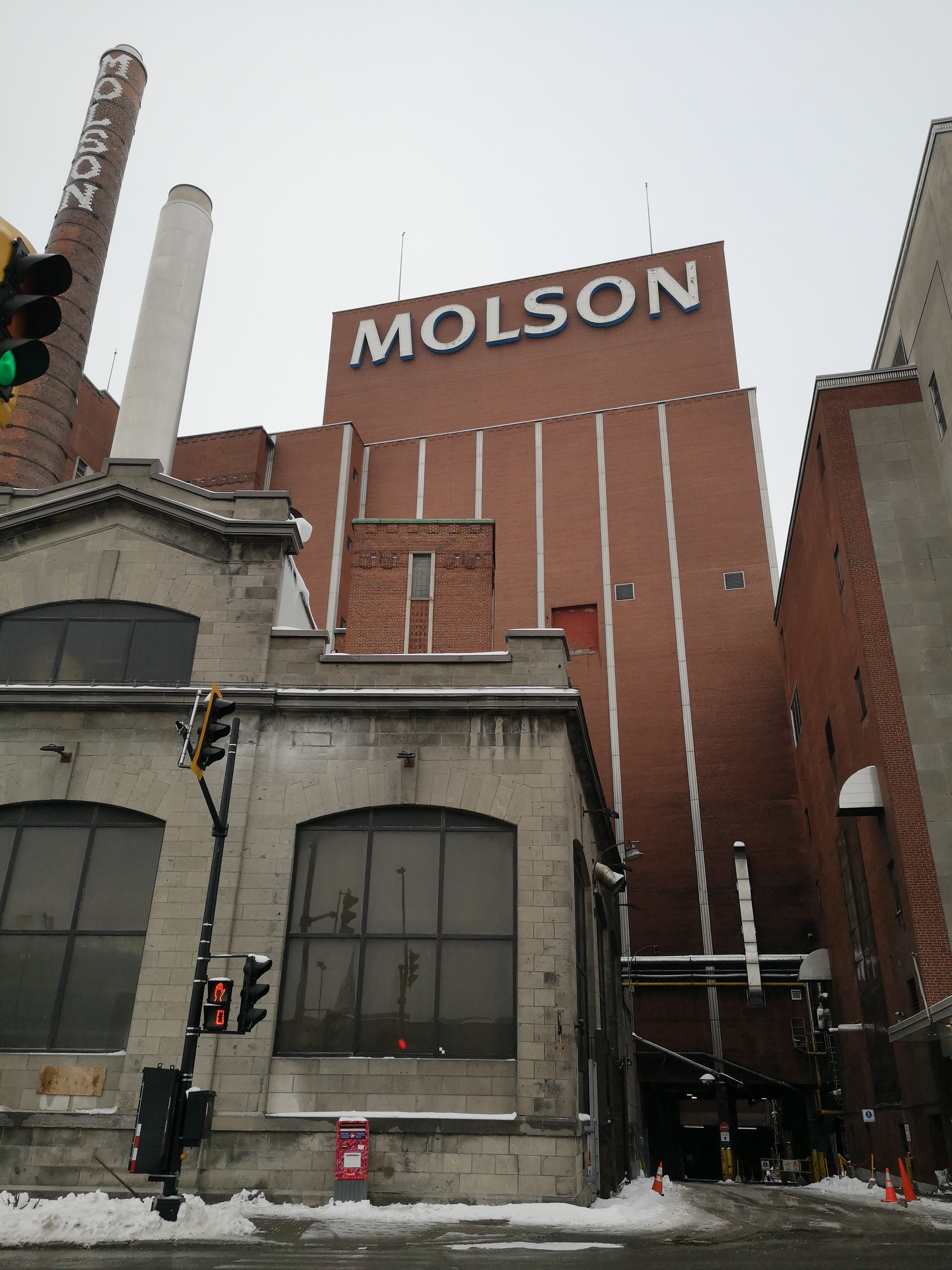
Former Molson brewery in Montreal (Main Building)

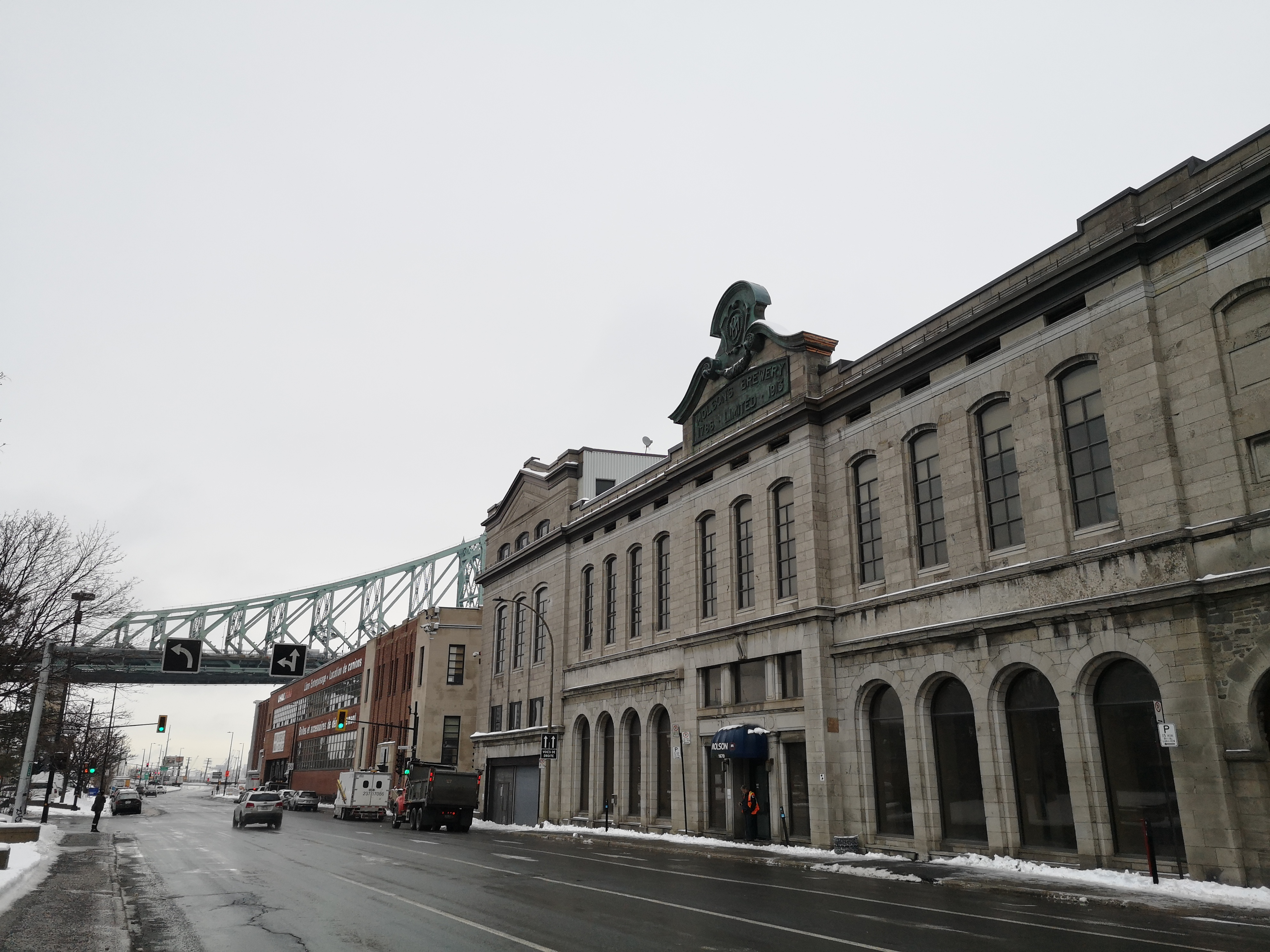
Former Molson brewery in Montreal (North-East View)

Molson Coors Canada is a unit of Molson Coors with operational headquarters located in Toronto (in addition to several breweries across Canada). Molson Coors Canada is part-owner of The Beer Store in Ontario (Brewers Retail Inc.), operating as a beer distribution and retail chain, which (protected by legislation) has an over 85% market share of the total Ontario industry beer sales. Molson Coors Canada owns 50% of Brewers Distribution Limited in Western Canada. Molson Coors Canada has the marketing and selling rights for Heineken in Canada.

On 30 October 2019, the Molson Coors Brewing Company announced it would change its name to Molson Coors Beverage Company as a part of a restructuring to take place in 2020. The name change would reflect the company's growing focus on beverages outside of the traditional beer and brewing offerings. Additionally, the company would reorganize its global business units, including Molson Coors Canada, into Molson Coors North America, headquartered in Chicago, and Molson Coors Europe, headquartered in Prague.

Molson Coors breweries in Canada are in:

- Longueuil, Quebec
- Toronto, Ontario – former Carling O'Keefe plant in Etobicoke, which replaced the old Lakeshore plant (demolished and replaced by WaterParkCity development in 2006)
- St. John's, Newfoundland and Labrador
- Chilliwack, British Columbia
- Creemore, Ontario – Creemore Springs
- Granville Island, British Columbia – Granville Island Brewing
- Shawinigan, Quebec – Trou du Diable
- Montreal, Quebec – Brasseur de Montréal

Former:

- Molson Brewery, Montreal, Quebec (1786–2021)
- Molson Brewery, Barrie – closed in 2000
- Molson Brewery, Edmonton – closed in 2007
- Molson Brewery, Vancouver – closed in 2019
- Molson Brewery, Toronto – closed in 1999

== Brands ==
Molson brands include Carling Black Label, Molson Export and Molson Canadian.

== Relationship with NHL ==
On June 20, 2009, brothers Geoff Molson and Andrew Molson, and their father Eric Molson announced the purchase of 80.1% of the Montreal Canadiens from Colorado businessman George Gillett. The Canadiens have historically been the NHL's most successful hockey team and last won the Stanley Cup in 1993. Along with the current majority ownership that the Molson brothers have of the team, the Molson company has owned all or portions of the Montreal Canadiens. In June 2009, the consortium led by the Molson brothers acquired the remaining 19.9% of the team that had been held by the company.

In the second decade of the 21st century, Molson and/or Coors had exclusive rights to sell their beverages at the home arenas of the Montreal Canadiens, Ottawa Senators, Toronto Maple Leafs, Edmonton Oilers, Colorado Avalanche, Arizona Coyotes, and Detroit Red Wings. Their beverages could be purchased at other sports venues, such as the home of the Buffalo Sabres, the KeyBank Center, the Philadelphia Flyers at the Wells Fargo Center, the Washington Capitals at the Verizon Center, and Bridgestone Arena, home of the Nashville Predators.

== Gallery ==
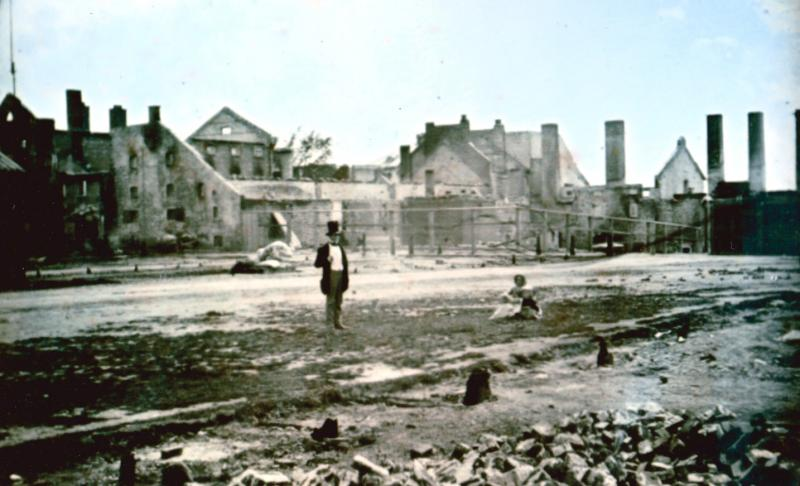
Brewer and businessman John Molson and his wife, at the family brewery and distillery which was razed to the ground in the second phase of the 1852 fire.

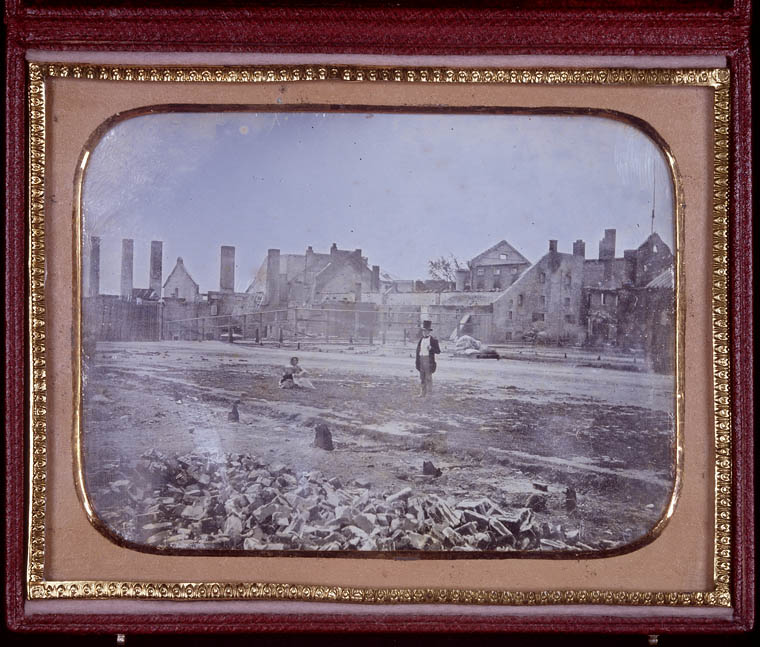
Molson family brewery after the fire of 1858

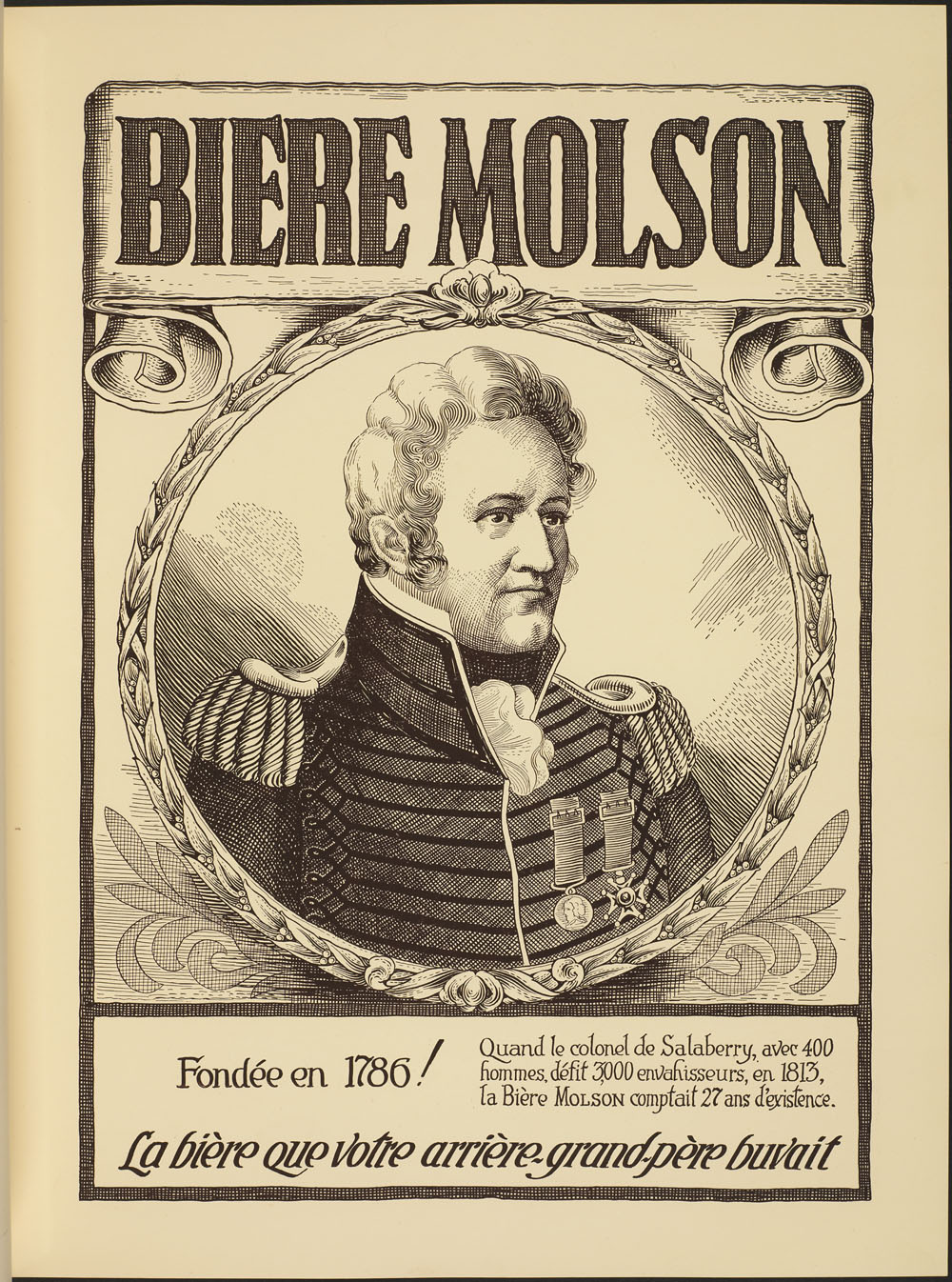
de Salaberry artwork, beer that your great-grandfather drank

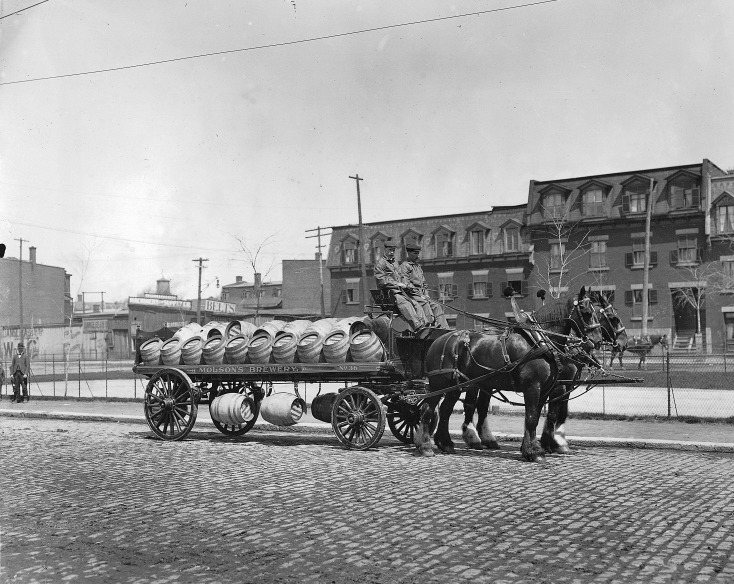
Chariot à bière de la Brasserie Molson, Montréal, Québec, Canada, vers 1908

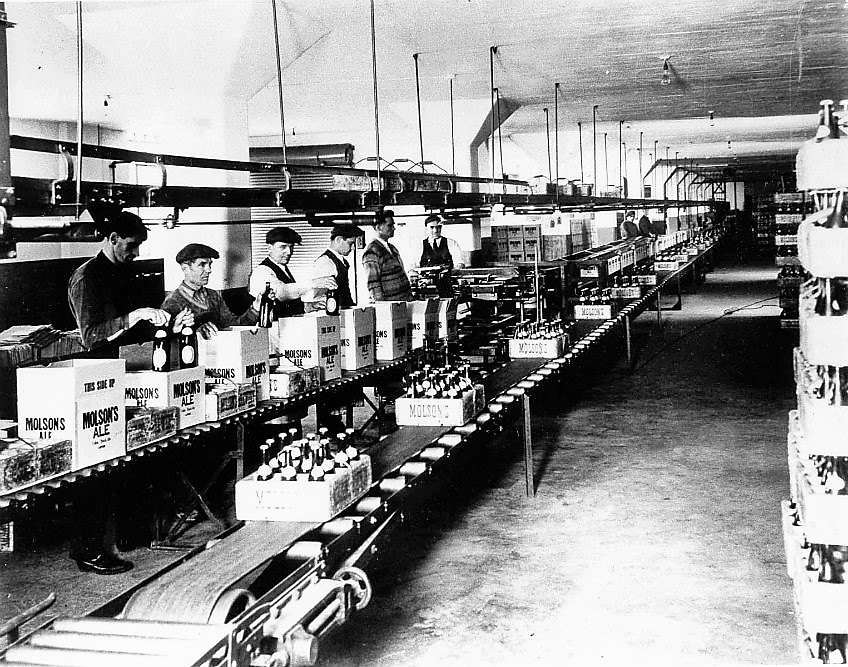
Brasserie Molson, Montréal, 1930: détail de plante bouteillage

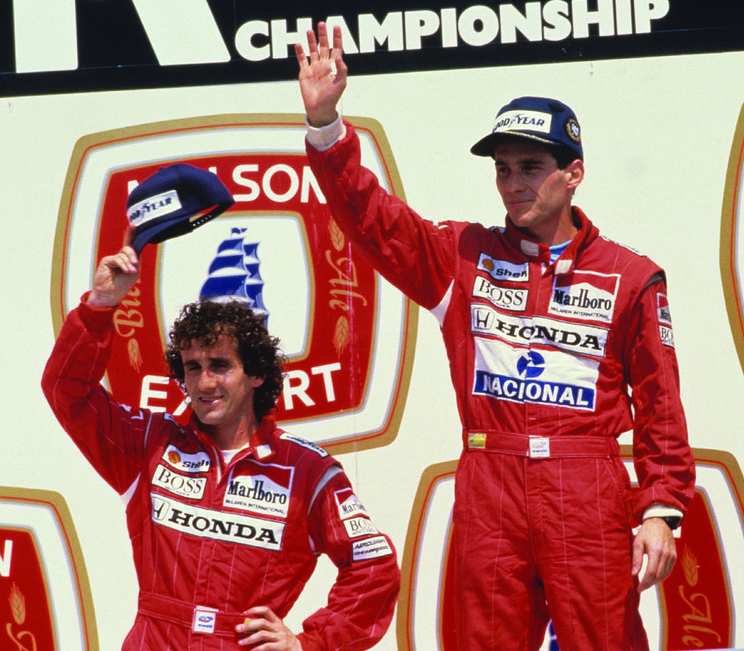
Molson's sponsored the Grand Prix in Montreal during Senna and Prost's day.

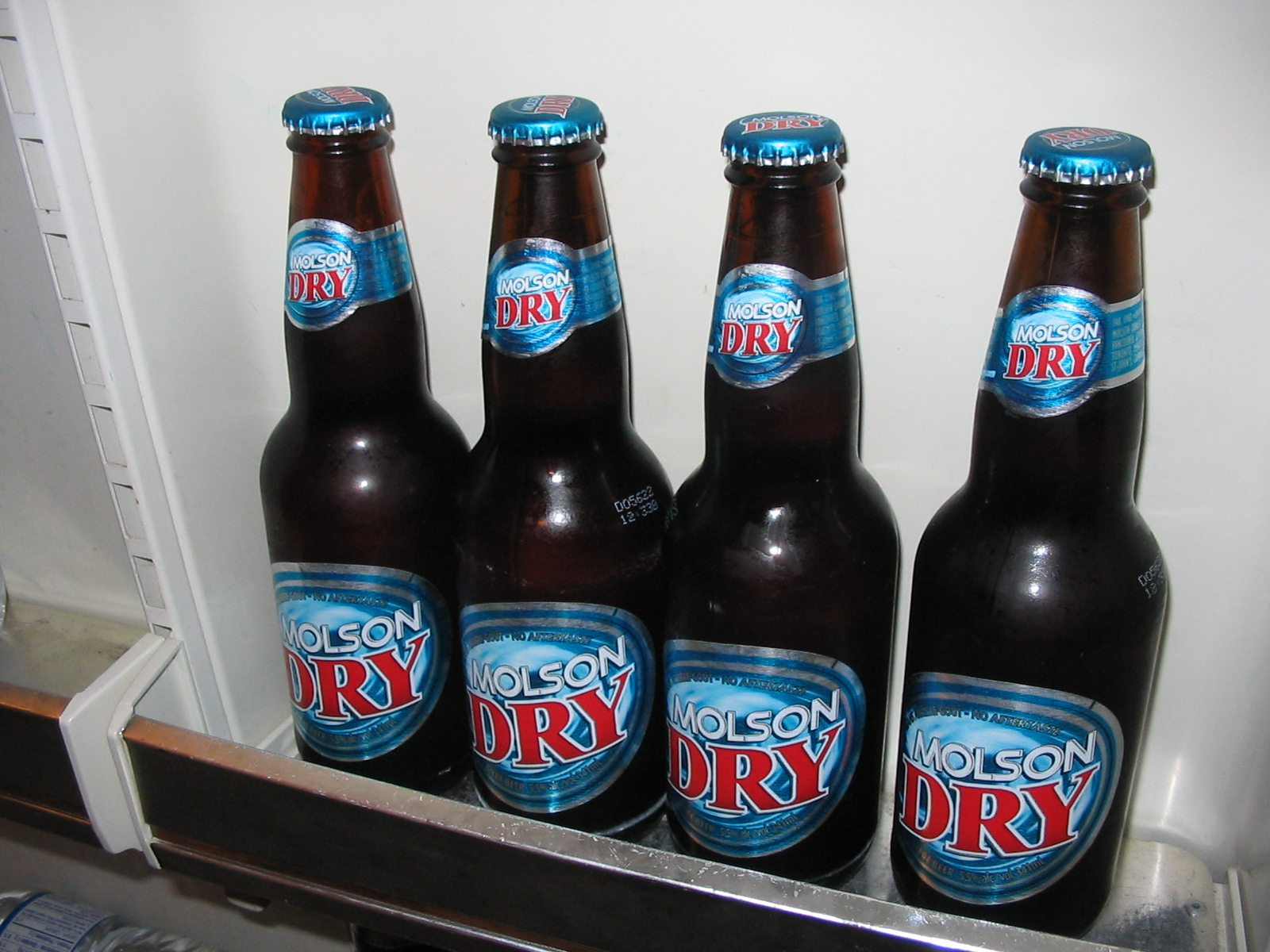
Molson Dry bottles in refrigerator

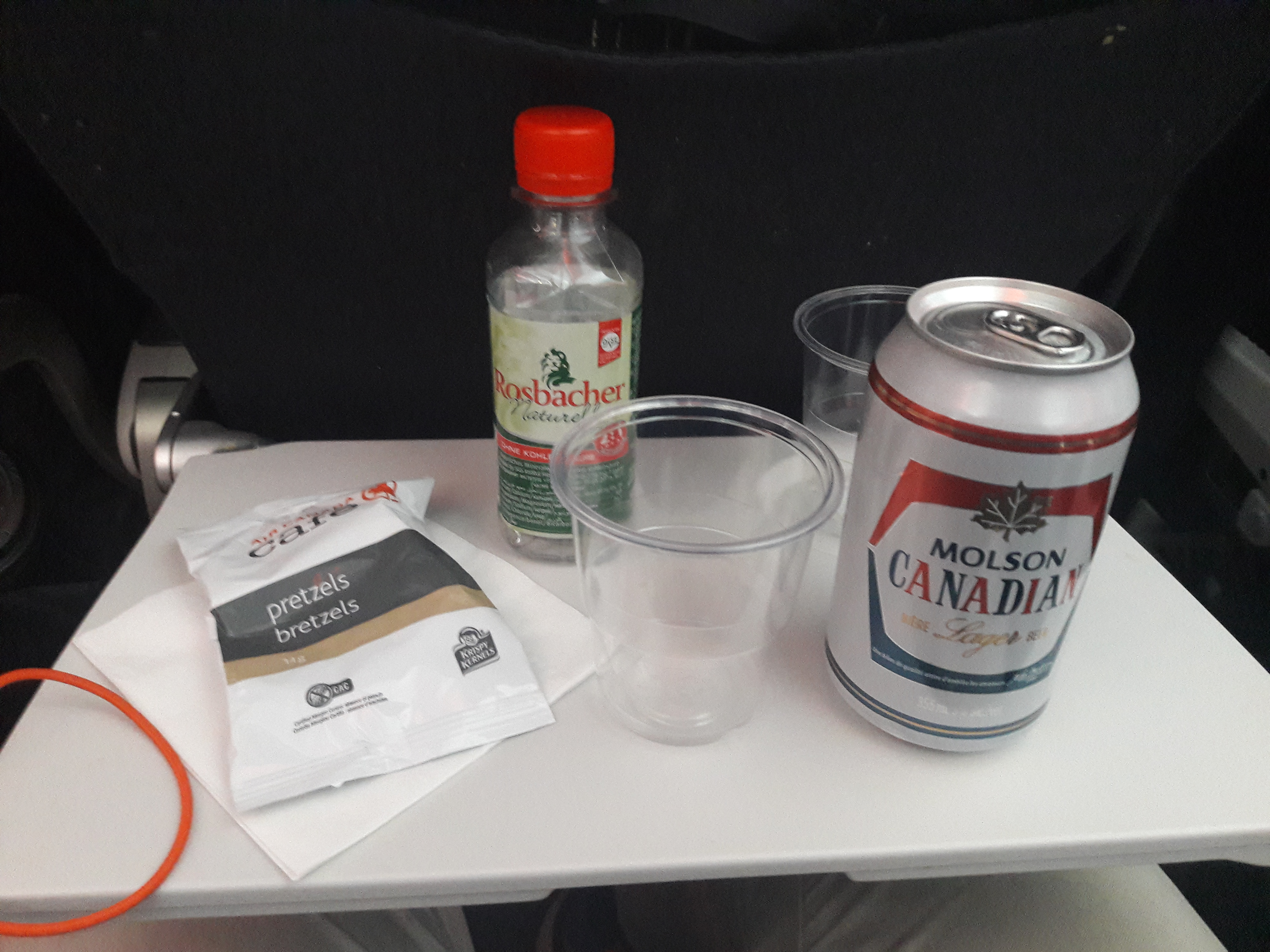
Molson Canadian beer can with pretzels on an Air Canada tray table in 2017

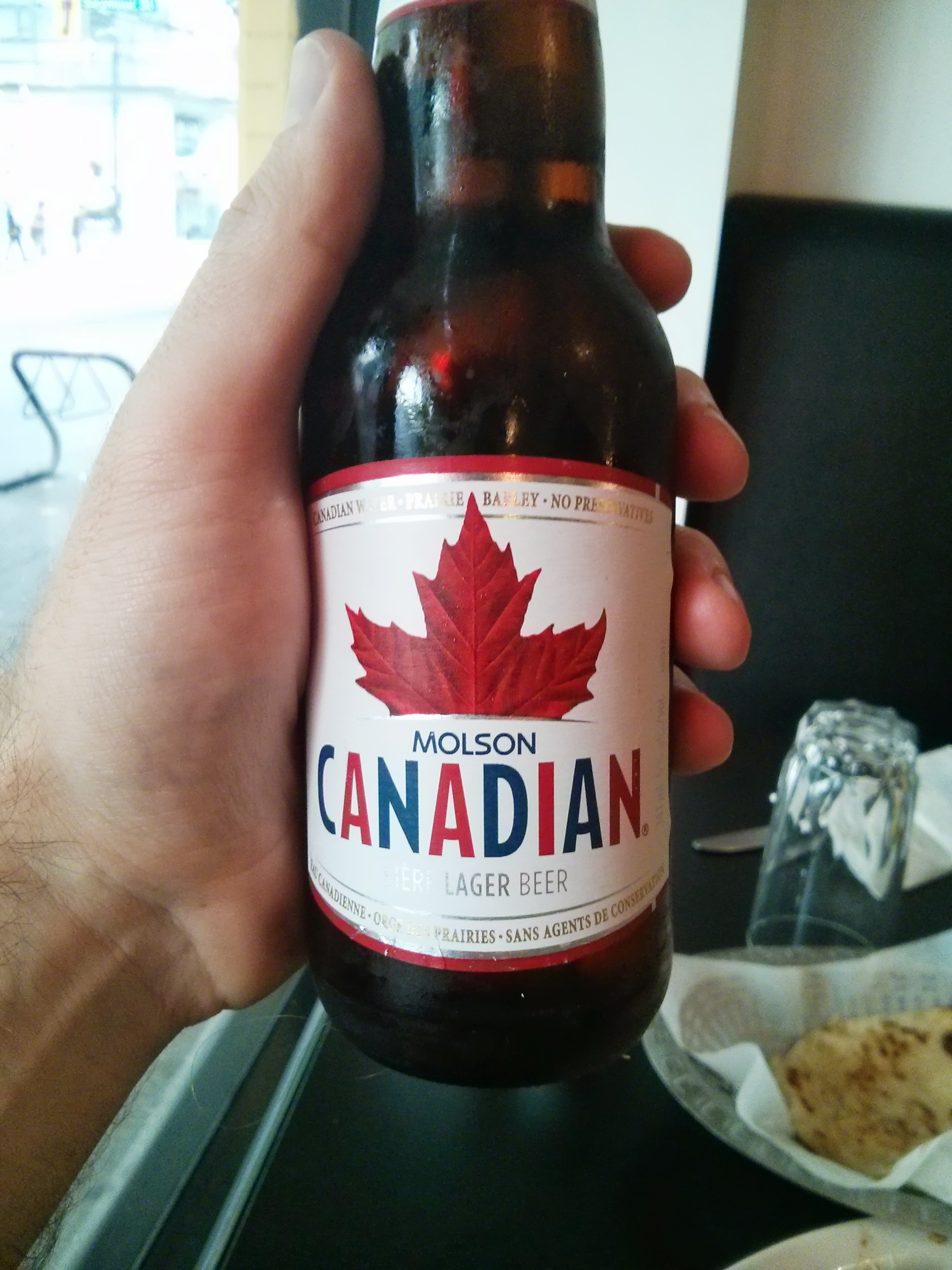
Bierflasche der Marke "Molson Canadian", August 2013

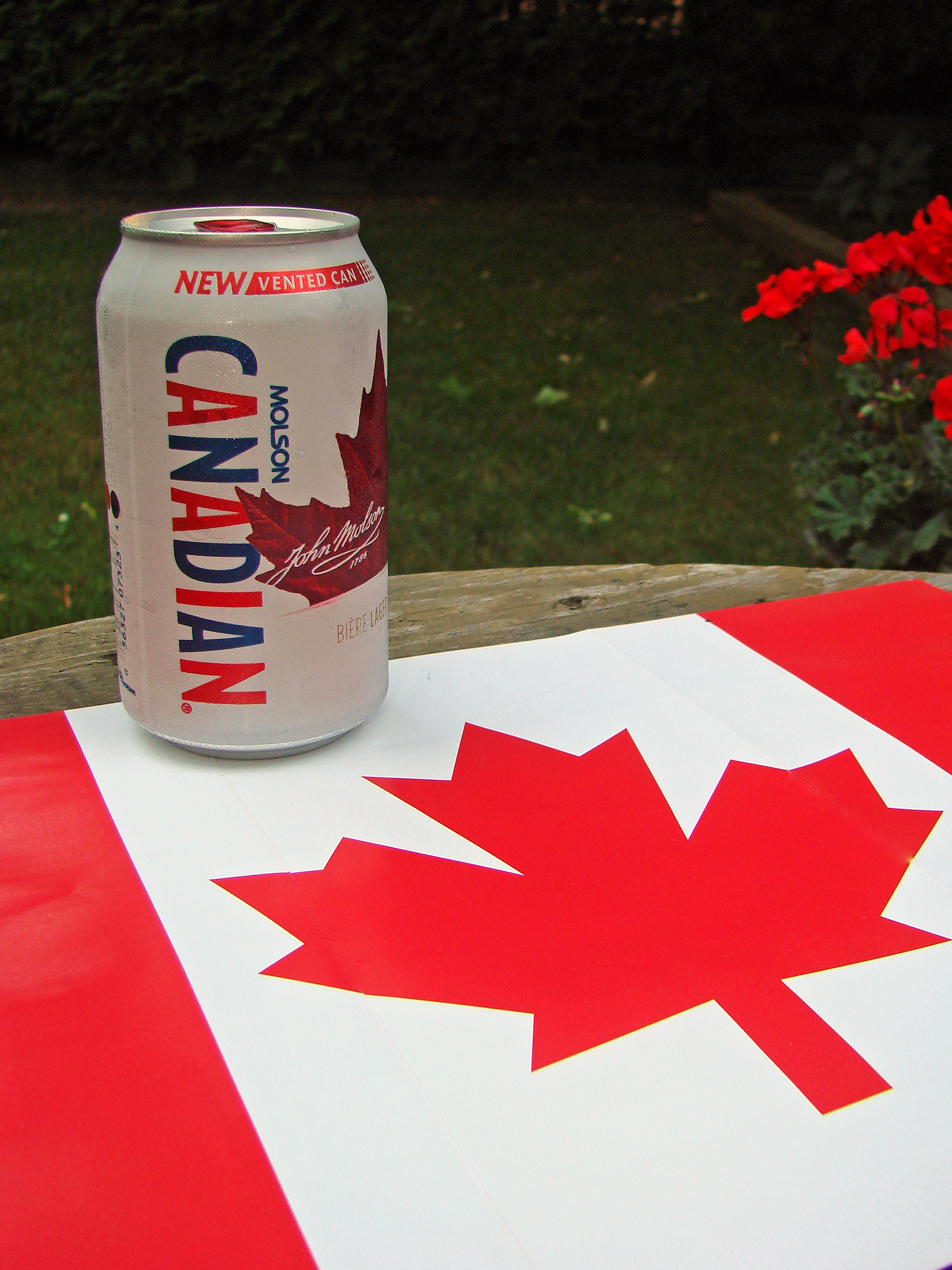
New-look Molson Canadian beer can superimposed on a Canadian flag, July 1, 2014

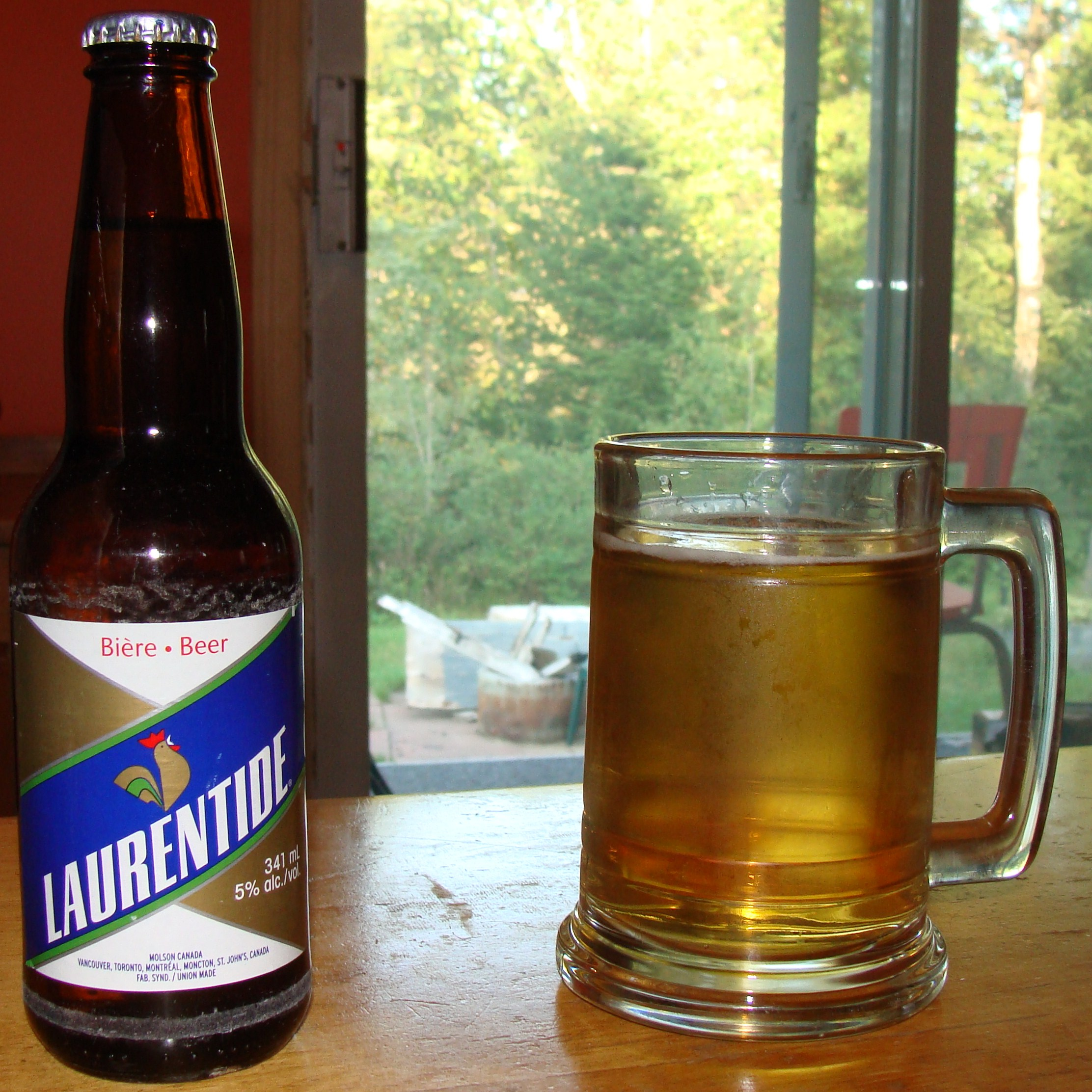
Bouteille de bière Laurentide, brassée par Molson uniquement au Quebec (juillet 2009)

Molson Export beer bottle label

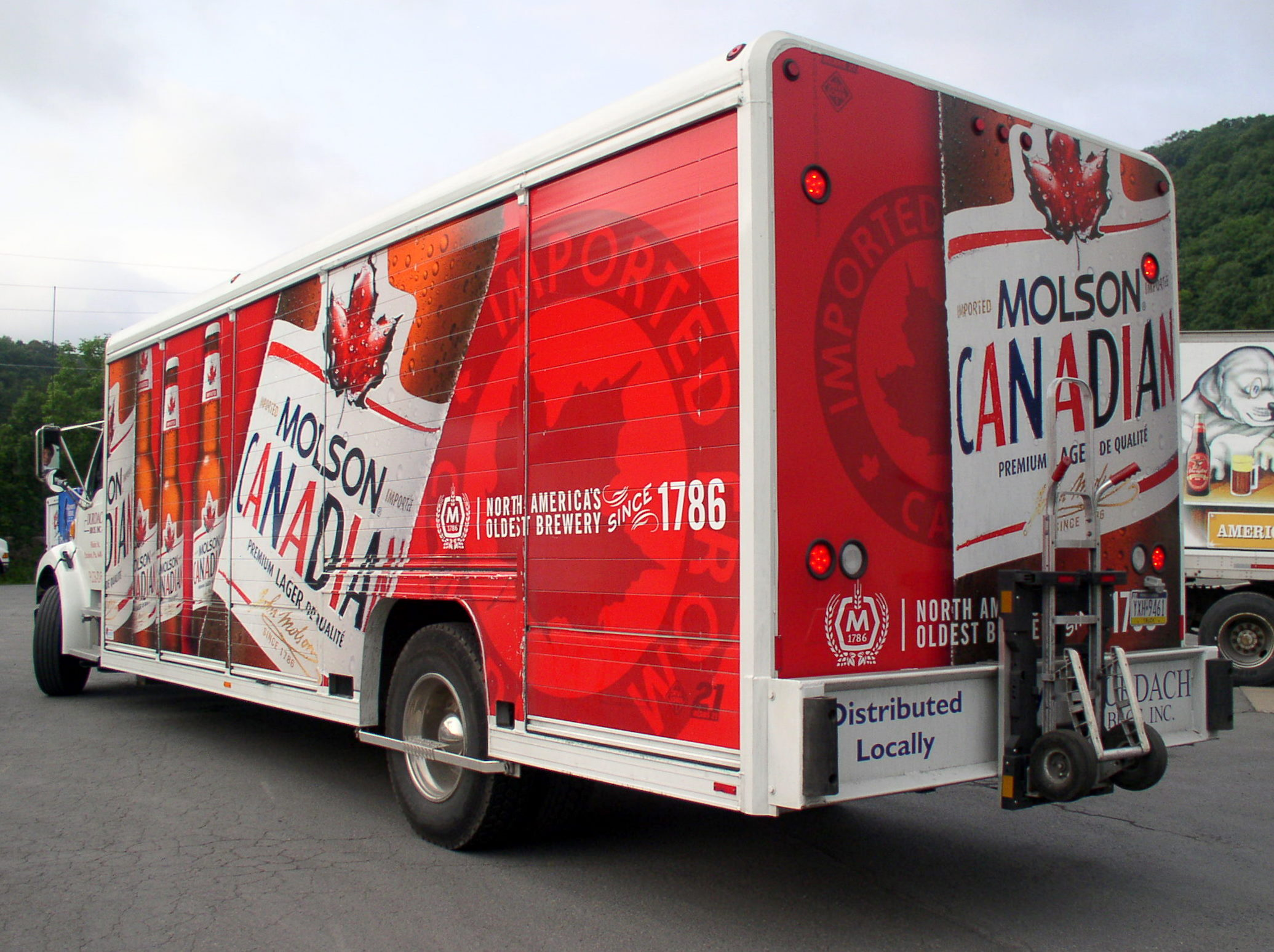
Molson's agent distribution truck somewhere in America, dated 2010, rear 3/4 view

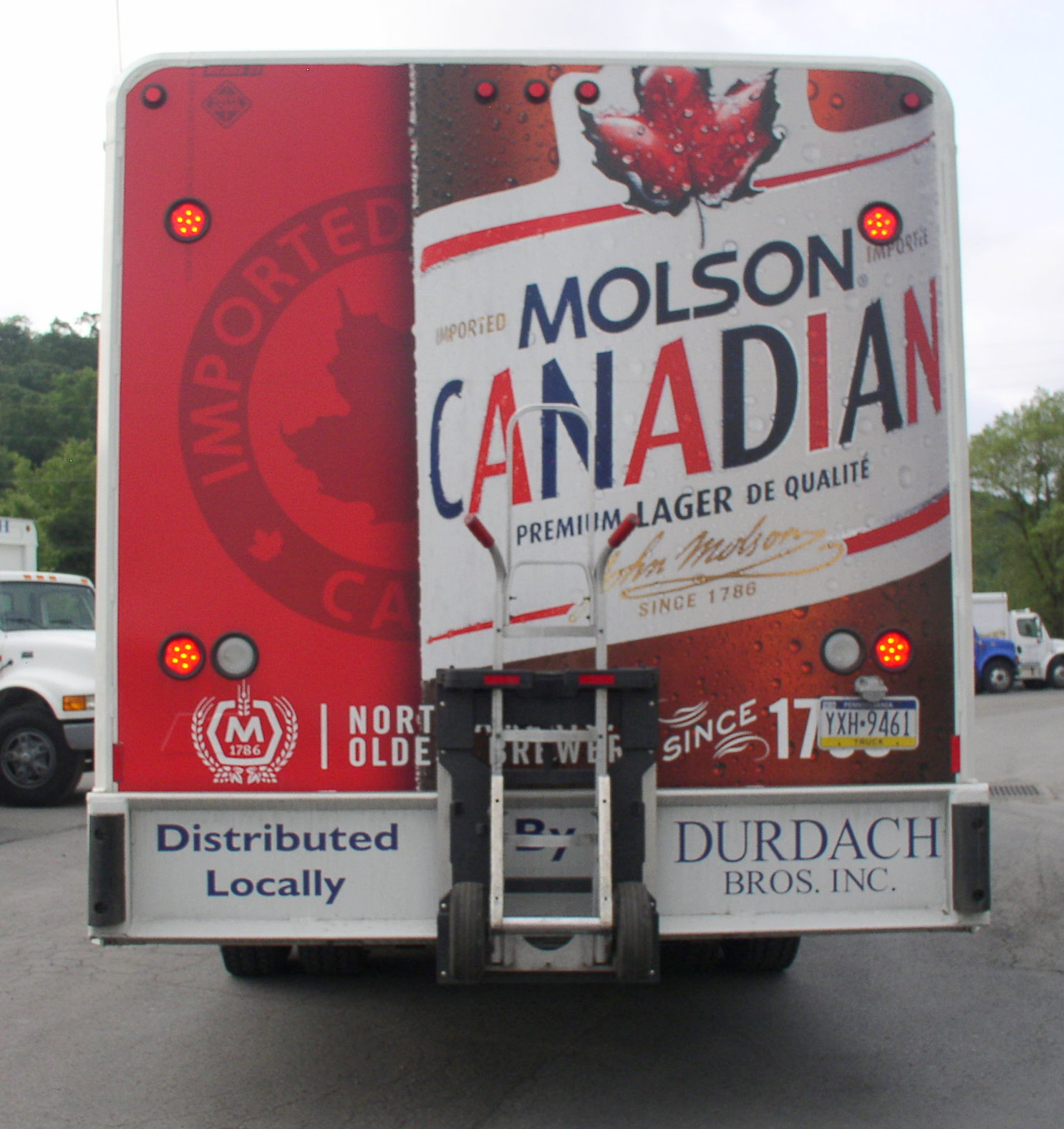
Molson's agent distribution truck somewhere in America, dated 2010, rear view

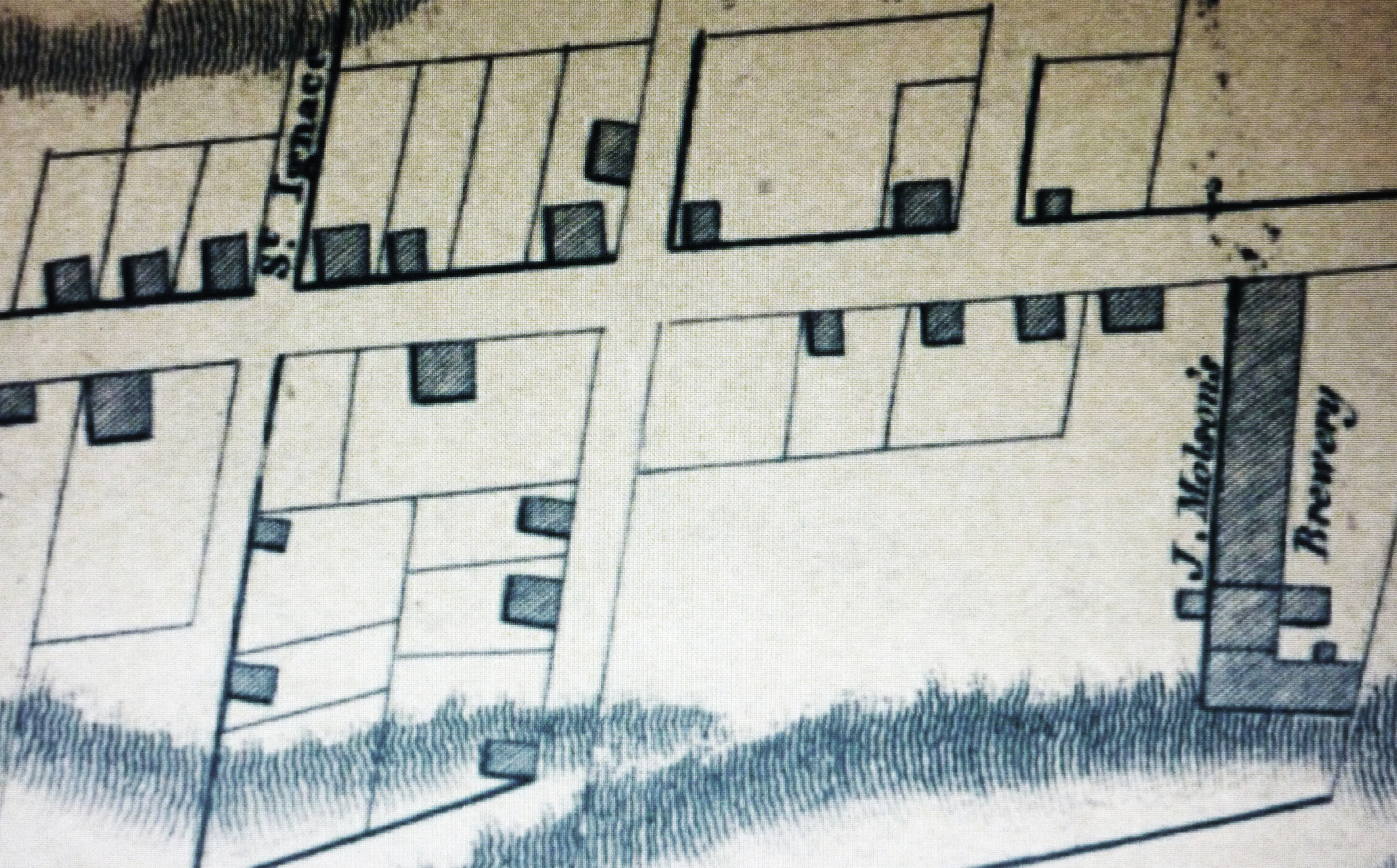
1815: Le détail de cette carte nous montre les installations de l'industriel John Molson dans le secteur Est de l'ancien faubourg Québec dans le premier quart du XIXè siècle - detail of urban plans

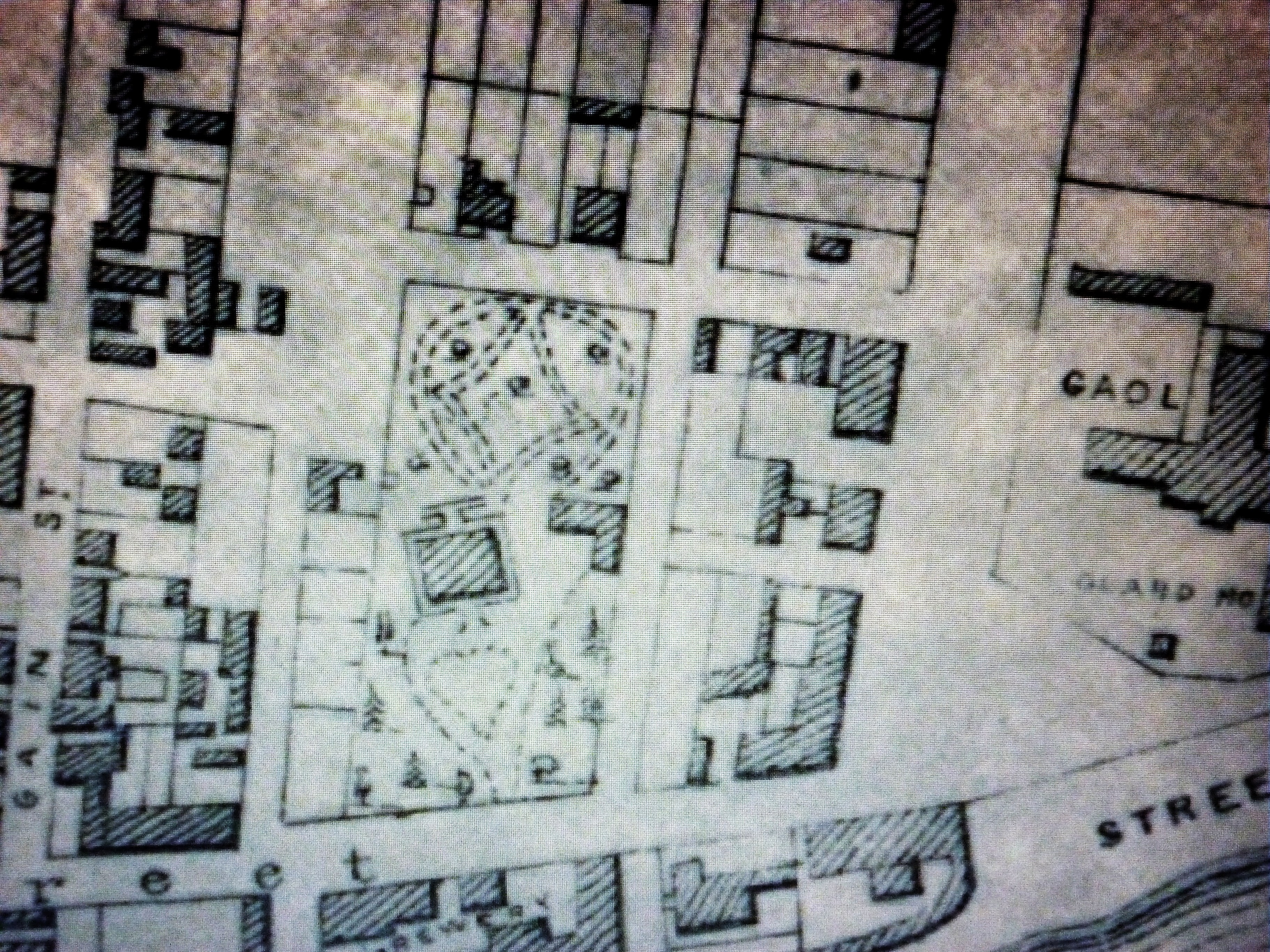
1846: Le nom de rue Érié n'est pas mentionné ici mais son tracé est nettement représenté: il bornait au Nord, un domaine aménagé, où la famille Molson avait fait construire une résidence cossue, détruite lors du grand Incendie de 1852. À droite, on voit la prison "Au Pied du Courant" où on pendit les "Patriotes" de 1837 - detail of urban plans

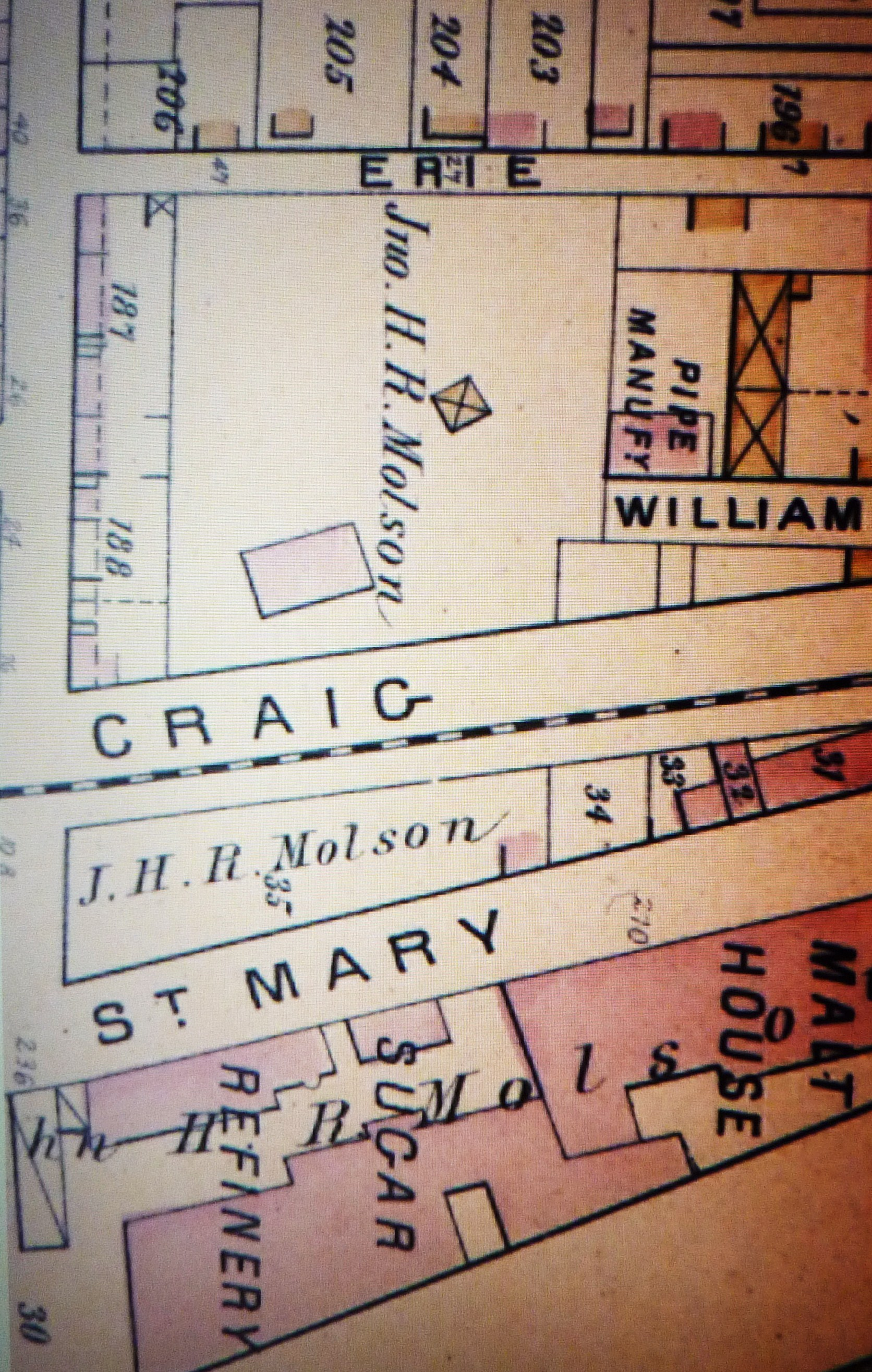
1879: Outre les installations de la Brasserie Molson, un atelier de fabrication de pipe (probablement celle de Robert Bannerman) formaient le paysage urbain du secteur de la rue Érié à cette époque - detail of urban plans

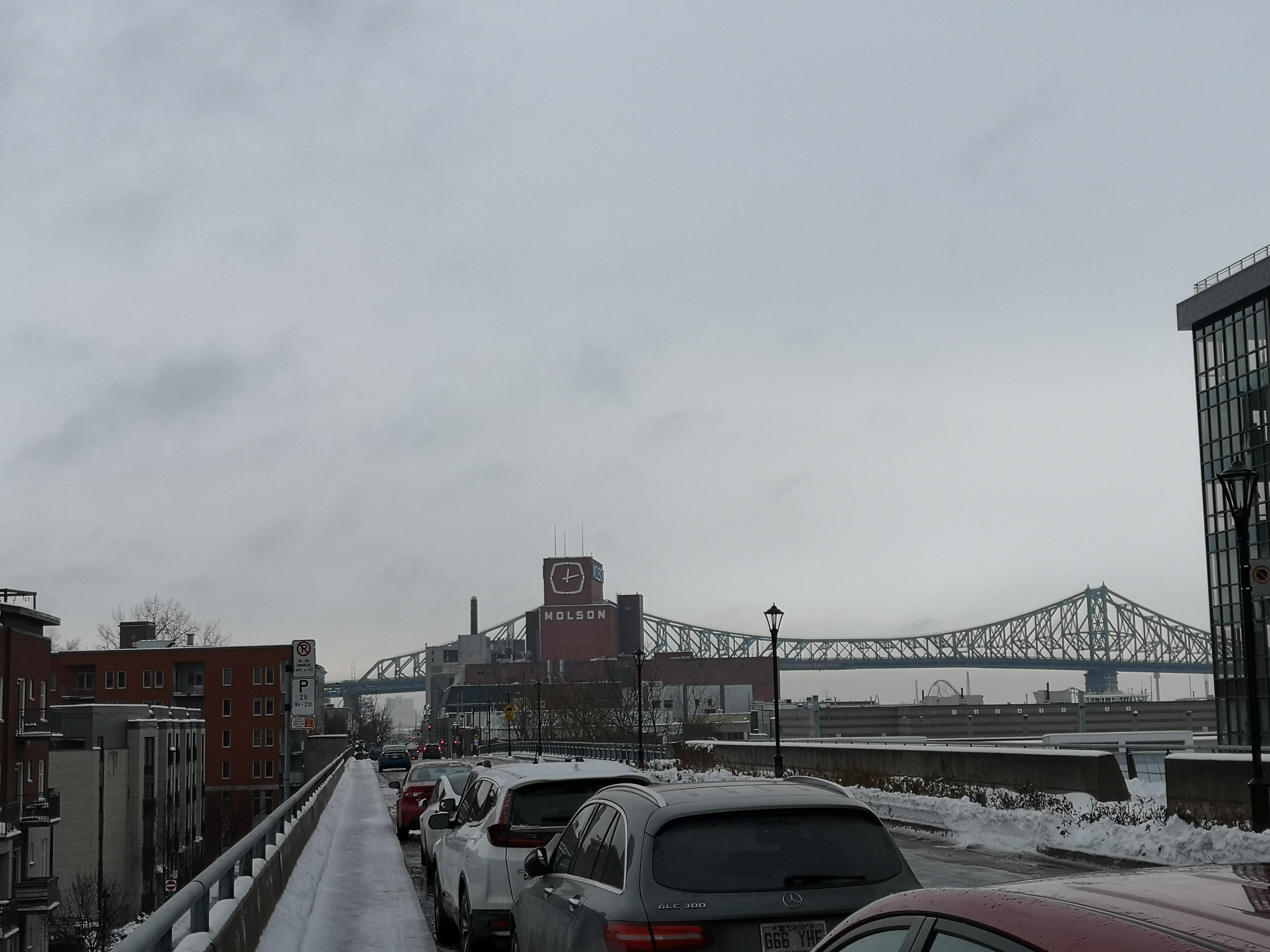
Former Molson brewery in Montreal

== See also ==
- Canadian beer
- Labatt
- List of breweries in Canada
- Ken Westerfield, Molson Frisbee Team
- Molson family
- Molson Coors Beverage Company

== Archives ==
There is a Molson fonds at Library and Archives Canada. Archival reference number is R3088.
