= Pilsener (disambiguation) =

Pilsener may refer to:

- anything from the city of Plzeň (German: Pilsen)
- Pilsner, a type of beer
  - Beer glassware#Pilsner glass, a variety of beer glass
  - Mash ingredients#Pilsner malt, a type of brewing malt
  - Prohibition in Iceland#History, non-alcoholic beer in Iceland during prohibition, usually mixed in such drinks as bjórlíki, a legal beer substitute
  - Old Style Pilsner, a beer brewed in Canada by Molson's popularly known simply as Pilsner in regions where it is widely consumed
