= Colorado Native Lager =

Colorado Native Lagers
- Type: Amber Lager
- Manufacturer: AC Golden Brewing Company, a subsidiary of Molson Coors
- Origin: United States
- Introduced: April 2010
- Alcohol by volume: 5.5%
- Website: www.coloradonativelager.com

Colorado Native Amber Lager is a 5.5% abv amber lager introduced in April 2010 by AC Golden Brewing Company, a subsidiary of Molson Coors. The beer was originally brewed in a 30-barrel brew house located inside the Coors Brewery in Golden, CO. Colorado Native Lagers are lagers brewed with Rocky Mountain water, Colorado-grown hops, Colorado-grown barley from the San Luis Valley and the oldest strain of brewer's yeast in Colorado. The beer is available only in Colorado.

In 2014, the company introduced an India pale lager.
