= Caffrey's Irish Ale =

Irish brand of beer

- Type: Ale
- Manufacturer: Molson Coors
- Distributor: Coors Brewing Company
- Origin: Republic of Ireland
- Introduced: Late 18th century
- Alcohol by volume: 3.8%
- Website: www.caffreys.ie

Caffrey's Irish Ale is an ale launched in 1994 by Bass Brewery and currently owned by Molson Coors.

== History ==
The Caffrey brewing family first brewed beer in Dublin in the late 18th century, about 30 years after the Guinness Brewery was founded. They too sited their brewery on the River Liffey, a few hundred yards east of the Guinness site.

Caffrey's Irish Ale was re-launched in 1994 and marketed as a beer which combined features from other types of beer: it could be served as cold as lager, its texture would be as smooth as stout, while its taste was that of an ale. Though launched with little advertising, it was priced at the top end of the market and was made available in over 7500 pubs. Sales of Caffrey's for the first year were higher than expected for a new product, at around 150,000 barrels in its first year. It was designed to appeal to "the ageing lager drinker...looking for a mature pint."

Coors Brewing Company acquired the US distribution rights to Caffrey's in December, 2001 when they purchased UK based Carling Brewers who owned the rights previously. Sometime in 2002, after Coors purchased Caffrey's from Interbrew, it ceased importation of the beer into the United States market. Coors decided that continued sale of Caffrey's in the US would interfere with the branding of Killian's as Coors's premier Irish brew. Many Irish bars around the US still have Caffrey's paraphernalia, but no longer sell the beer.

Coors's decision to sell Killian's over the nitrogen charged Caffrey's in the US market allowed Diageo, makers of Guinness, to gain market share with its Smithwick's brew in Irish bars throughout the US. Caffrey's is still available in the United Kingdom and Canada.

In 2011, Caffrey's sold around 35,000 barrels in the UK, down from 200,000 in 2002. From 2000, the popularity of Caffrey's rapidly declined, despite a relaunch in the UK in 2010. After this date, it is apparent that there was a strategic decision by Coors to concentrate on other brands, although no official announcement was made.

== Product ==
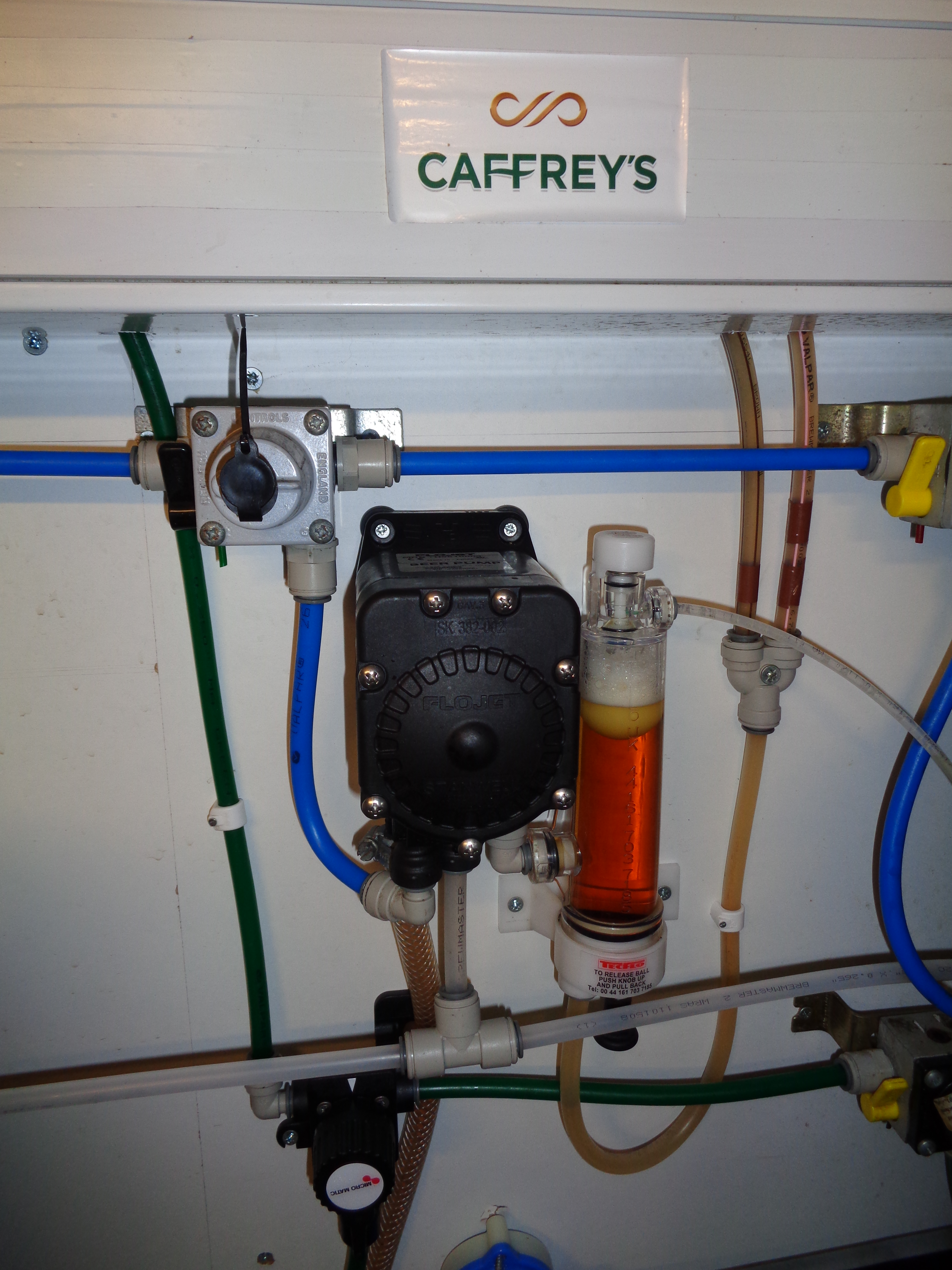
Caffrey's in a float chamber

At its launch Caffrey's was brewed to 5.2% ABV. In 2001 it was reduced to 4.2% and to 3.8% in 2010 in an attempt to halt declining sales. It is based on an 1897 recipe and is designed to be served between 4 and 6 degrees Celsius.

Caffrey's was later launched in 440ml cans, featuring a nitrogen pocket that agitates the beer when you open it giving it a characteristic closer to a draught beer. Nitrogen is less soluble than carbon dioxide, which allows the beer to be put under high pressure without making it fizzy. The high pressure of dissolved gas is required to enable very small bubbles to be formed by forcing the draught beer through fine holes in a plate in the tap, which causes the characteristic "surge" (the widget in cans and bottles achieves the same effect). The perceived smoothness of Caffrey's is due to its low level of carbon dioxide and the creaminess of the head caused by the very fine bubbles that arise from the use of nitrogen and the dispensing method described above.

== Brewery ==
Thomas Caffrey first established the Ulster Brewery in Queen Street, Belfast, in 1897. The brewery was sold to the Ulster Brewing Company in 1950. The last member of the family to have been active in the business, Nicholas James Caffrey, died in 1984, survived by two daughters, Virginia and Bridget (since deceased), and one son, Nicholas Philip Caffrey. The brewery was acquired by Charringtons (later Bass Charrington) in 1964 and then by Interbrew in 2000. On July 6, 2004, the owners of the former Caffrey's brewery, Interbrew, announced their intention to dispose of the site of the brewery. Having no takers, they closed the brewery in 2005. The Caffrey's Ulster Brewery, established in Belfast in 1897 and taken over by Bass in 1974, closed in 2004, so ending big company brewing in Northern Ireland.

== See also ==
- Coors Brewing Company
- Molson Coors
