= Cold Shot =

Cold Shot may refer to:

- Cold Shot, a musical group founded by American guitarist Anthony Gallo
- "Cold Shot", a song by Stevie Ray Vaughan and Double Trouble from their 1984 album Couldn't Stand the Weather

== See also ==
- Molson Canadian Cold Shots, a brand used by Molson Coors
