= Andrew Molson =

Canadian businessman (born 1967)

Andrew Thomas Molson CM CQ is a Canadian businessman born in 1967 in Montreal. He is the eldest son of Eric Molson and the brother of Justin Molson and Geoff Molson. He is a member of the Molson family.

== Education ==
Andrew Molson attended secondary school for two years at Collège de Montréal, where he was the only Anglophone in his class, followed by Phillips Exeter Academy. He holds a law degree from Université Laval, a Bachelor of Arts degree from Princeton University and a master's degree in Corporate Governance and Business Ethics from the University of London (Birkbeck College).

== Career ==
Andrew Molson is Chairman of the Res Publica Group since 1997. He owns shares in the Molson Coors Brewing Company and is a member of the Board of Directors of the Deschênes Group, Dundee Corporation and CH Group Limited Partnership, owner of the Montreal Canadiens.

== Philanthropy ==
Andrew Molson is Chairman of the Molson Foundation Board of Trustees, the Montreal General Hospital Foundation and Pointe-à-Callière Museum. He also sits on several boards of other organizations, including the Institute on Governance of Private and Public Organizations, the Concordia University Foundation, the Banff Centre, the Evenko Foundation for Emerging Talent and the Public Policy Forum.

Molson was made was made a Knight of the National Order of Quebec in 2020 and a Member of the Order of Canada in 2021.
