= Saint Archer Brewing =

Brewery in San Diego, United States

Saint Archer Brewing Company
- Location: San Diego, California, US
- Opened: 2013
- Closed: 2022
- Owned by: Molson Coors

Saint Archer Brewing Co. was a brewery in San Diego, California. It was sold to brewing conglomerate Molson Coors in 2015 and run as a subsidiary under the Tenth & Blake group. In January 2022, Molson Coors Beverage Company announced that it would stop production of the Saint Archer brand and sell its San Diego–based brewery and taproom to Kings & Convicts Brewing Co., which owns the Ballast Point brand.

As part of the deal, Kings & Convicts took over Saint Archer’s 100,000-barrel capacity Miramar brewery and adjoining taproom, as well as its 1,200-square-foot taproom in Leucadia, Calif. Kings & Convicts, headquartered in San Diego and Highwood, Illinois, planned to retain operations and retail team members at both locations.

Josh Landan founded Saint Archer in March 2013, and Molson Coors took it over in 2015. The takeover was the first craft brewery that MillerCoors acquired.

In 2014, Saint Archer Brewing won a Great American Beer Festival gold medal and four San Diego International Beer Festival medals: two gold, a silver, and a bronze.
