= AC Golden Brewing Company =

Colorado subsidiary of MillerCoors

Coordinates: 39.755543°N 105.2211°W

- Industry: Alcoholic beverage
- Founded: July 11, 2007
- Headquarters: Golden, Colorado, USA
- Key people: Glenn Knippenberg
- Products: Beer
- Owner: MillerCoors
- Website: http://www.acgolden.com

The AC Golden Brewing Company, founded July 11, 2007 by Pete Coors and Glenn Knippenberg, was a subsidiary of MillerCoors, a Division of Molson Coors Brewing Company. Its purpose was to serve as a specialty brewing arm of MillerCoors; in the words of president Glenn Knippenberg, "Our mission for AC Golden is to be a brand incubator for what is now MillerCoors". The AC Golden Brewery operates in the former pilot brewery of the Coors Brewery. It debuted its first beer, Herman Joseph's Private Reserve, in 2008. In April 2010, AC Golden Brewing Company introduced Colorado Native Amber lager in Colorado, a lager made with 100% Colorado ingredients. The Colorado Native family of beers is sold only in Colorado. After Miller was purchased by Molson Coors, MillerCoors was dissolved, and AC Golden Brewing Company became an entity of Tenth and Blake Beer Company, the craft and import division of Molson Coors.

== History ==
The AC Golden Brewing Company operates at the historic Coors Brewery in Golden, Colorado, established in 1873 by German immigrants Adolph Coors and Jacob Schueler, itself originally called the Golden Brewery. With the advent of the Coors Field baseball stadium in 1995, Coors started the Sandlot Brewery in a historic warehouse incorporated into the stadium. This craft style brewery began brewing Blue Moon, a Belgian-style witbier. Noting the changing American beer market, parent Molson Coors decided to pursue Blue Moon's blueprint by creating the AC Golden Brewing Company and slowly developing new brews with it. This was placed into the realm of MillerCoors when this joint venture took effect in 2008. In 2008, AC Golden debuted its first beer to the public, Herman Joseph's Private Reserve, now brewed as a German style lager. It is sold only at restaurants in the Denver/Golden metropolitan area. The brewing of Herman Joseph's Private Reserve has been transferred to the Sandlot Brewery in Coors Field. MolsonCoors closed AC Golden in September of 2024.

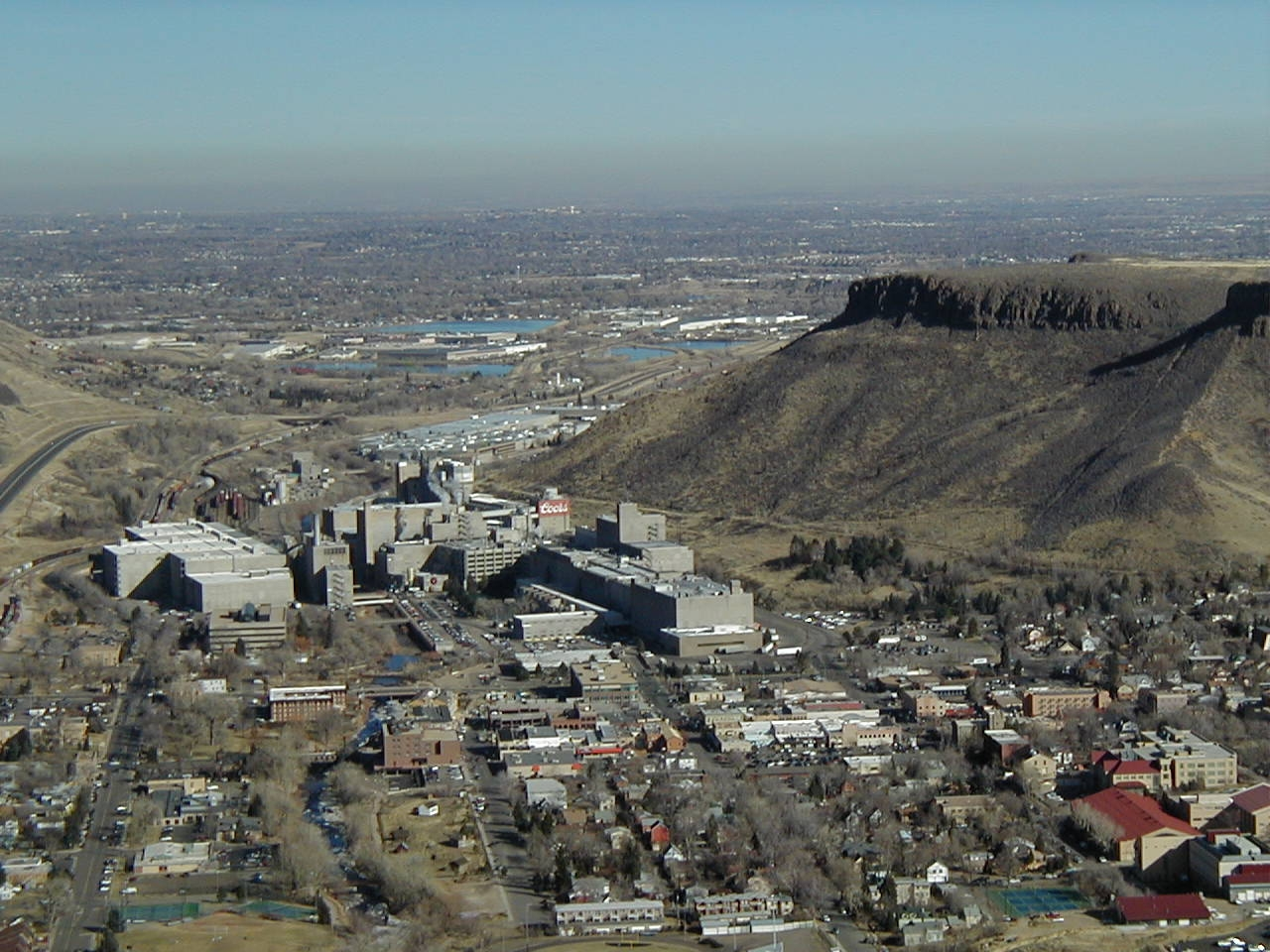
Coors brewery in Golden, Colorado, home of AC Coors Brewing Company

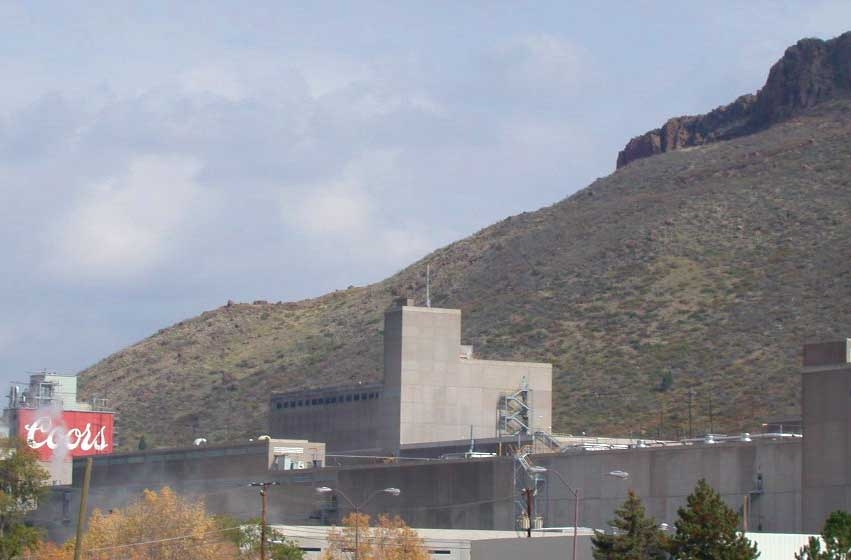
Coors brewery in Golden, Colorado, home of AC Coors Brewing Company

== Product Lines ==
- * Herman Joseph's Private Reserve (2008 - since moved to Sandlot Brewery at Coors Field)

Colorado Native Amber Lager (2010)

- Colorado Native India Pale Lager (2014)
- Colorado Native Golden Lager (2015)
- Colorado Native Double IPL (2015)
- Colorado Native Saison (2015)
- Colorado Native Olathe Lager (2015)
- Colorado Native Oktoberfest (2015)
- Colorado Native West Slope IPA (2018)
- Colorado Native Winterfest (2015)
- Ctayt Russian Imperial Stout (2015)

== See also ==
- Coors Brewing Company
- Molson Coors Brewing Company
- MillerCoors
