= Coors Light =

American light beer

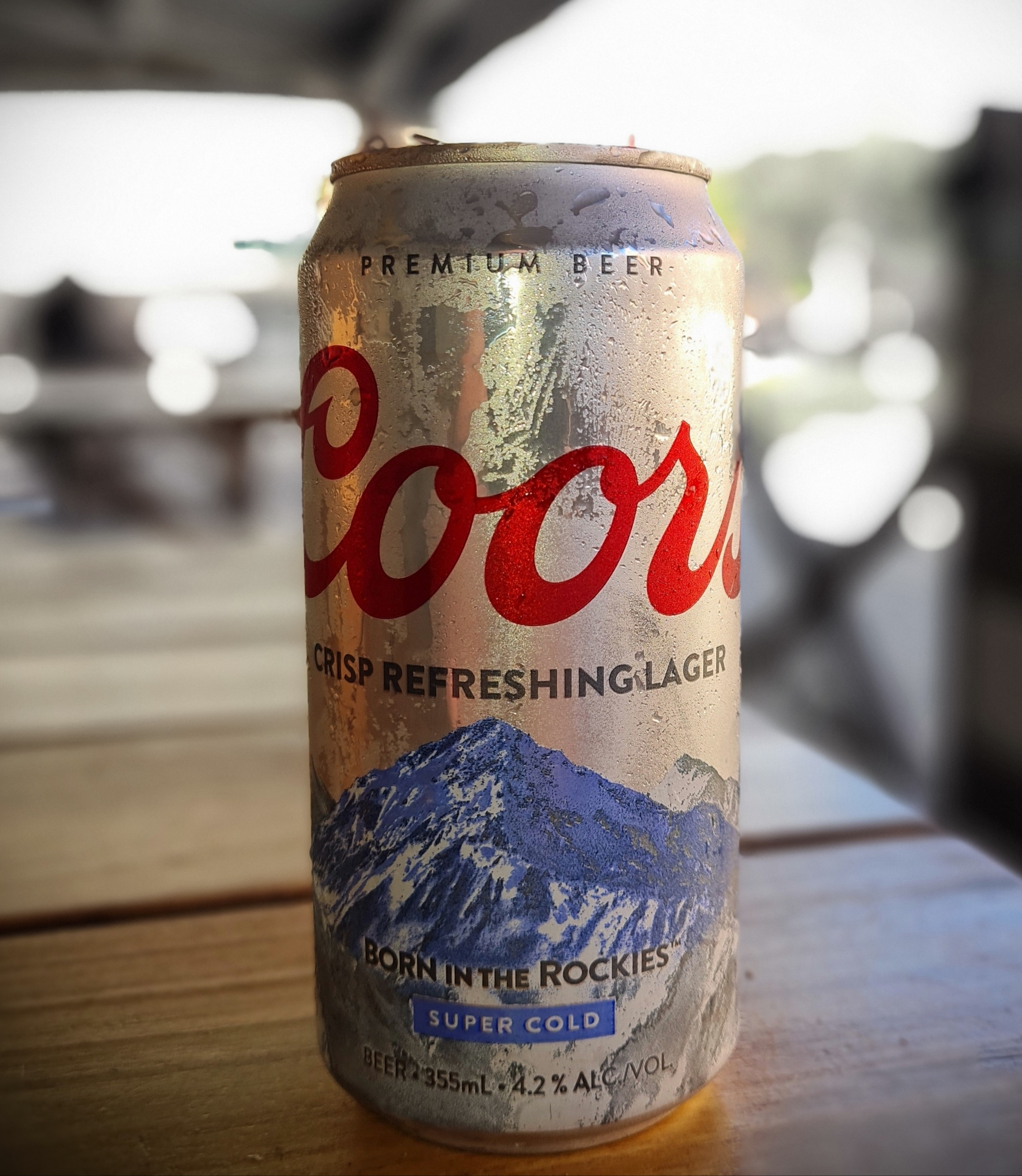
- Coors Light can
- Type: Pilsner-style light American lager
- Manufacturer: Coors Brewing Company
- Distributor: Coors Brewing Company
- Origin: United States
- Introduced: 1978; 48 years ago
- Alcohol by volume: 4.2%
- Website: www.coorslight.com

Coors Light is a 4.2% ABV light American lager beer sold by Coors (currently Molson Coors) of Chicago, Illinois. It was first produced in 1978 by the Coors Brewing Company. They had briefly produced a different low-alcohol beer by the same name in 1941.

It is brewed in Golden, Colorado; Albany, Georgia; Elkton, Virginia; Fort Worth, Texas; Irwindale, California; and Milwaukee, Wisconsin, among other locations in the USA. The Canadian version of Coors Light is 4.0% ABV and brewed by Molson Coors Canada Inc. in Moncton, New Brunswick; St.John's, Newfoundland; Longueuil, Quebec; Toronto, Ontario and Chilliwack, British Columbia. In Australia, the United Kingdom and Ireland, Coors Light is labeled as "Coors".

Coors Light's primary competitors are Miller Lite and Keystone Light, both also owned by Molson Coors, and Bud Light, owned by AB InBev, Molson Coors's rival and fellow global beer giant.

== History ==
In 1941, Coors introduced a lower-alcohol beer called Coors Light. The beer was discontinued after one year on the market. Coors Light was reintroduced in 1978 to compete with Miller Lite as a "diet beer".

Coors markets its other product, Coors Banquet Beer as "America's fine light" because it was lighter in body and color than other beers when it was introduced. This has created confusion between the Coors beers, despite the beers being of different recipes and calorie levels. This confusion has been aggravated by the marketing of Coors Light simply as Coors in Europe.

== Marketing and advertising ==
The beer has a "Cold Certified" label which turns the mountains on the label from white to blue when the beer's temperature is lowered to 39 °F (4 °C). The success of this packaging gimmick has led to the phrase "Mountains are Blue" becoming a popular saying among working-class Western Americans. Coors Light has a "mountain icon" to represent the beer as part of the logo. As of 2020, the icon is a stylized drawing of a mountain with two peaks, along with the removal of their famous 'cold lined' can conditioning blue liner. Coors Light advertising highlights the quality of the beer as the most refreshing place on earth. Additionally, Coors Light ads are designed to target young demographics. The stories behind the ads seek to capture the attention of young people, situating them in cool places they would like to be. The Cavalry advertising agency of Chicago, IL was responsible for the 'Reach For The Cold' Campaign featuring the Coors Light Explorers. In April 2013, the agency produced a Digital Video for Coors Light ad known as Coors Light the brewer ambushes a summer pool party with the frosty taste of winter. The television ad was considered the ad of the week in the Adweek publication.

The brewery introduced the tagline "perfect shot of refreshment" under the slogan of a “Silver Bullet”, a symbol of the silver can that holds the beer.

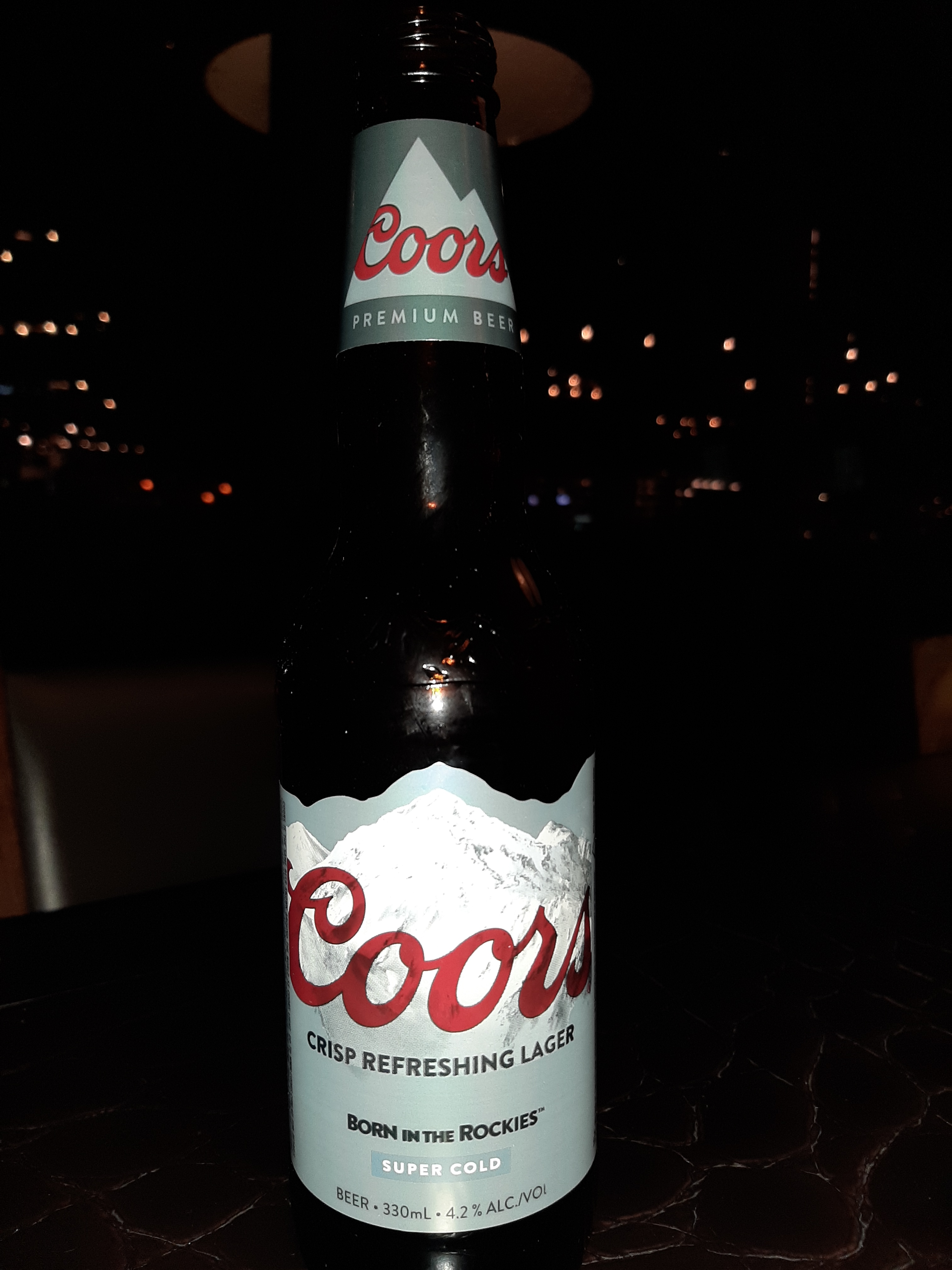
In Australia, Coors Light is marketed as Coors.

== Containers and packaging ==
In May 2013, the Coors Light aluminum pint, featuring Ball Corporation's Alumi-Tek bottle, was awarded a Gold Award from The Packaging Association (PAC) and was chosen as the Canadian Packaging Consumers Voice Award winner at the recent PAC Leadership Awards. The Coors Light aluminum pint was selected for its eye-catching graphics, recyclability and the convenience of the bottle's wide mouth and resealable closure.

== Controversial can advertising claims ==
In August 2013, the advertising industry's self-regulatory unit referred Coors Light ad claims to the Federal Trade Commission (FTC). The claims that the FTC considered ad challenging included, “the world's most refreshing can", "beer on the inside, science on the outside" and "smoother, more refreshing pour", implying that the can was somehow technologically superior to other beer cans and provides a more refreshing beverage experience. According to the National Advertising Division (NAD), Coors declined to provide a substantive response to the challenge. Coors defended the claims as either puffery or truthful. The company also told NAD that the television, radio and digital campaigns would be permanently discontinued by the end of September 2013.

== International markets ==
In order to expand Molson Coors brand portfolio outside of its major markets (US, UK, Canada), Molson Coors established Molson Coors International in 2008. MCI operates in four primary regions; Asia, Europe, Latin America and the Caribbean. Coors Light, as a signature brand of Molson Coors, was introduced in the new markets. The world's sixth-largest brewer, which also makes Molson Canadian, Carling and Blue Moon, was trying to diversify beyond its core markets.

== Awards and sponsorship ==
Coors Light advertising on the boards of an NHL ice hockey rink during a playoff game.

Since 1998, Coors Light has sponsored numerous LGBT pride parades and events. MillerCoors is the primary sponsor of the Coors Light Denver PrideFest.

In 2005, Coors Light was awarded with a silver medal in the Great American Beer Festival in the American-Style Light Lager category.

Title sponsorship of the newly created Coors Light National Hockey League Stadium Series. Coors' sponsorship of the stadium series is part of the beer company's seven-year, $375M deal signed with the NHL in February 2011, the league's most financially lucrative sponsorship ever.

In 2013, Coors Light signed a year-long deal with Turner Broadcasting, which includes a sponsorship of the NASCAR Mobile applications. Coors Light uses the sponsorship with in-application banners and content to connect with NASCAR's core demographic of sports fans. The initiative builds on Coors Light's previous mobile initiatives to target consumers by demographic.

== Promotions ==
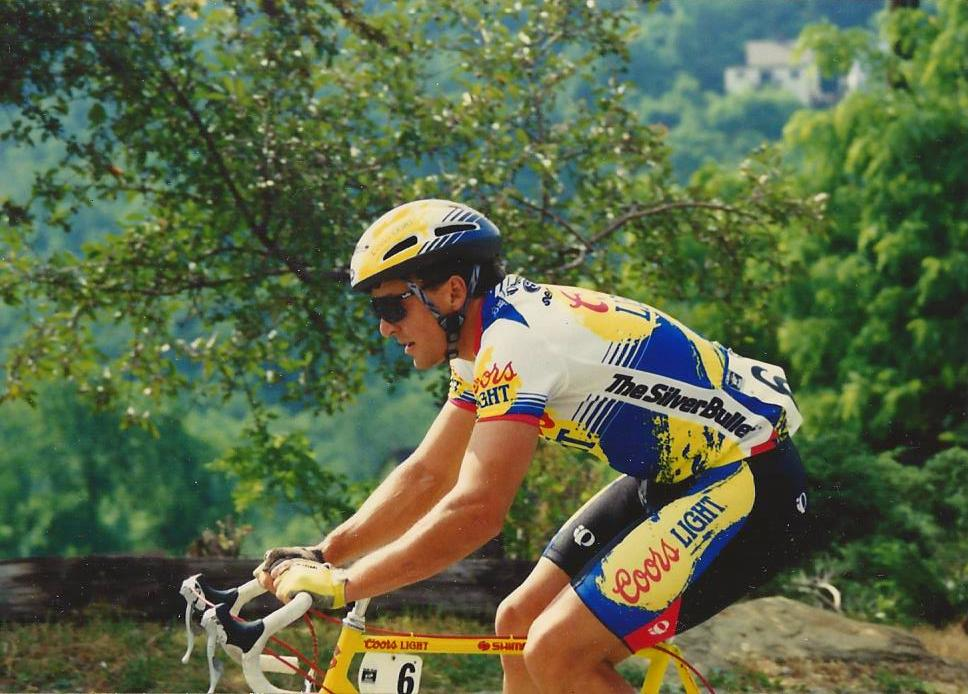
Coors Light sponsored Davis Phinney in 1991

In the 1990s, Coors Light sponsored what was then America's most dominant domestic professional cycling team, which included Olympians Alexi Grewal, Roy Knickman, and Davis Phinney.

In 2008, Coors Light became known as the "Official Beer of NASCAR", succeeding Budweiser.

In 2009, a Coors Light koozie depicting scenes from the 2010 Winter Olympics was offered in a limited number of cases that contained 28 bottles instead of 24. That same year, the Hillside Chalet Contest was created. The winner was given a 6-night stay in Whistler, British Columbia, during the 2010 Winter Olympics.

During 2012 and 2013, Coors Light partnered with Ice Cube for the Coors Light Search for the Coldest National Tour and Talent Search.

Prior to the 2019 college football season, Coors struck a deal with ESPN and their College GameDay broadcast to become "The Official Beer of Saturday Morning.”
