= Geoff Molson =

Canadian businessperson

- Born: July 23, 1970 (age 56); Montreal, Quebec, Canada
- Education: St. Lawrence University; Babson College
- Occupation: CEO Montreal Canadiens
- Spouse: Katherine Brigid Finn (m. 1998)
- Family: Molson Family

Geoffrey Eric Molson CM CQ (born July 23, 1970), is a Canadian businessman and current president and chief executive officer and co-owner of the National Hockey League's Montreal Canadiens, Evenko, Bell Centre, and L'Équipe Spectra alongside his brothers Andrew Molson, and Justin Molson. He is also a member of the ownership group behind the Toronto Tempo. He is a member of the Molson family. He is also the Honorary Colonel of the Royal Military College Saint-Jean, in Quebec, Canada. Molson was made a knight of the National Order of Quebec in 2019 and a member of the Order of Canada in 2021.

== Early life and education ==
Molson, the son of Eric Molson and Jane M. Molson, was born and raised in Montreal where he attended Selwyn House School and Lower Canada College.

Molson holds a Bachelor of Arts from St. Lawrence University in Canton, New York, and a Master of Business Administration from Babson College in Wellesley, Massachusetts.

== Personal life ==
He has four children with his wife, Kate. They are named Henry, William, Tom, and Maggie. Three of the children played or are playing college hockey. Henry had a career at NCAA Division III New England Small College Athletic Conference (NESCAC) Colby College. William fared similarly, also playing at Colby College. Tom, meanwhile, plays at Yale University, an NCAA Division I school in the Eastern College Athletic Conference.
