= Granville Island Brewing =

Brewery on Granville Island in Vancouver, British Columbia, Canada

Granville Island Brewing Company
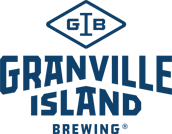
- Industry: Alcoholic beverage
- Founded: 1984
- Headquarters: Granville Island; Vancouver, British Columbia, Canada
- Products: Beer
- Production output: 60k Hectolitres Est.
- Owner: Creemore Springs, a Molson Coors subsidiary
- Website: Official website

The Granville Island Brewing Company (GIB) is a brewery originally based on Granville Island in Vancouver, British Columbia, Canada. It was founded in 1984 and calls itself "Canada's first microbrewery". In 1989, it was sold to the wine conglomerate Andrew Peller Ltd. In 2009, it was bought by Creemore Springs, a subsidiary of Molson Coors, which in 2016, became the third largest beer corporation in the world. Of brewers with locations in British Columbia, Granville is the seventh largest based on sales to the BC Liquor Distribution Branch.

== History ==
Old logo used until 2019.

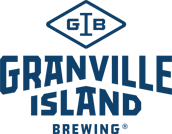
Logo used until 2022.

Granville Island Brewing was founded in 1984 by Mitch Taylor. The first Brewmaster was a German import who later quit the 65 Hectolitre brewery in 1988, after winning a lottery. In 1989 Potters IXL hired James Holden away from Carling O'Keefe Breweries to make changes in the product quality and consistency and to work with the new union. Potters financed building renovations as well as the installation of a new 120 Hl tank maturation cellar while upgrading the old Krones bottle Filler with a new body, back and neck labelling station. Holden developed a recipe for Granville Islands first non-lager Pale Ale, a product addition in 1990. The new union was tremendously difficult to work with so James Holden quit to move on to project management of a new 250 Hl brewery installation in Nha Trang, Vietnam. Shortly afterwards he left, the larger operation was moved to Kelowna (1994?) and a small 10 Hectoliter craft brewery manufactured by NSI in Abbotsford was installed to make small amounts of beer in a one-man operation. Long-time brewmaster Vern Lambourne joined Granville Island Brewing in 2002 (correction required...probably 1994 to 1996). Between 1984 and 2005 five new beers were released. In August 2005, Andrew Peller Wines purchased Granville Island Brewing from Taylor and in 2006 renovated the original facilities beneath the Granville Bridge and expanded into new, larger facilities located in Kelowna. In 2009 Molson Coors Canada purchased Granville Island Brewing through its subsidiary, Creemore Springs Brewing, from Andrew Peller Wines.

== Location and operations ==
Though the larger part of its base of operations moved inland to Kelowna, in the Okanagan Valley, the original brewery continues to manufacture some of the company's products, and offers beer-tasting tours. The original brewhouse is located directly under the Granville Bridge that crosses False Creek into downtown Vancouver. Tours of the small brewery are held daily. In the company's taproom, twelve of the company's beers are available on tap, four of which are generally limited releases only available at the brewery.

== Products ==
Granville Island Brewery names its beers after local places and neighbourhoods in British Columbia.

Core Beers

- Island Lager
- English Bay Ale
- Brockton West Coast IPA
- Kitsilano Juicy IPA

Draft Exclusives

- False Creek Peach Sour
- Cypress Honey Lager

Seasonal

- False Creek Raspberry Ale (Available April–October)
- Lions Winter Ale (Available October–April)

Taproom Series

- Black Lodge Cascadian Dark Ale
- Flamingo Mango Hibiscus Sour
- Triple Eh American Amber Ale
- Juicebox Hazy IPA
- Island Side Westcoast IPA
- Polar Hop Cold IPA
- Groovy Guava Hazy Pale Ale

== See also ==
- List of breweries in Canada
