= Old Style Pilsner =

Canadian beer

- Type: Pilsner
- Manufacturer: Molson Coors Brewing Company
- Distributor: Molson-Coors Canada Inc.
- Origin: Canada
- Introduced: 1926
- Alcohol by volume: 5.0%
- Website: pilcountry.com

Old Style Pilsner (often known as Pilsner, Pilly, Pil or ‘Sner) is a brand of beer brewed by Molson-Coors Canada Inc. Created in the pilsner style, it has been brewed in western Canada since 1926.

Old Style Pilsner was first brewed in 1926 by Fritz Sick at his Sick's Breweries Ltd. in Lethbridge, Alberta. The beer was and still is brewed after the formula of the House of Lethbridge, which can be seen in the top left hand side of the label. Sick's Breweries Ltd. grew in the early half of the 20th century to include breweries located throughout western Canada and the United States. In 1958, Sick's Breweries Ltd., along with the Old Style Pilsner Brand, was bought by Molson Inc.

Old Style Pilsner became available in Ontario in 1992 but only remained available for a few years there. Around May 20, 2013, Old Style Pilsner was reintroduced at The Beer Stores in Ontario, where it is sold in cases of 24 bottles and a variety of pack sizes in cans.

In 2015, Old Style Pilsner was introduced in Quebec, mainly in corner stores and grocery stores like Métro, Loblaws and IGA.

The beer appeared in the movie Fubar. Molson's sponsorship of the Canadian Football League's Saskatchewan Roughriders is centered on the brand, with the adults-only standing room section of the south end zone at Mosaic Stadium dubbed Pil Country.
