= Eric Molson =

Canadian businessman (born 1937)

- Born: September 16, 1937 (age 88); Montreal, Quebec, Canada
- Education: Selwyn House School; Institut Le Rosey
- Alma mater: Princeton University; McGill University
- Occupations: Chairman, Molson Coors

Eric Herbert Molson CM OQ (born September 16, 1937) is a Canadian billionaire businessman. He is the former chairman of Molson Coors and former Chancellor of Concordia University. He is a member of the Molson family.

== Education ==
Born in Montreal, Eric Molson was educated at Selwyn House School in Montreal and Institut Le Rosey in Switzerland. He holds an Arts Baccalaureate with honours in chemistry from Princeton University, and was also a graduate student in economics at the McGill University Graduate School of Library and Information Studies. He also holds a Master Brewer certificate from the American Brewers Academy.

== Career ==
Eric Molson joined the company in 1960 and was a member of the board of directors for Molson from 1974 to 2005, and was chairman from 1988 to 2005. Following Molson's merger with Coors to form Molson Coors, he served as chairman from 2005 to May 13, 2009. Eric Molson retired on May 13, 2009, after 50 years with the company. He continues to serve as a chairman emeritus and director of Molson Coors Brewing Company.

He was chancellor of Concordia University 1993 to 2005.

Molson is an honorary director of the Bank of Montreal, and sat on the board from 1987 to 2000.

He is also the director of the Montreal General Hospital Corporation and Foundation since 1962, as well as the Canadian Irish Studies Foundation and Vie des Arts magazine.

== Honours ==
Eric Molson was invested as a Member of the Order of Canada on October 27, 2007. He was made an Officer of the National Order of Quebec in 2013.

== See also ==
- List of Bishop's College School alumni
