= Killian's =

Brand of beer

George Killian's Irish Red
- Type: Amber lager
- Manufacturer: Heineken N.V. U.S.: Molson Coors (d/b/a Unibev)
- Origin: Ireland
- Introduced: 1864
- Alcohol by volume: 5.2%
- Website: georgekillians.com

George Killian's Irish Red is a red beer, produced and sold in France by Heineken France, and under license in the United States by Molson Coors under the trade name Unibev. Despite the differences in the brewing methods, the marketing of both beers claim legacy to an Irish "original recipe".

== History ==
George Killian's Irish Red is a beer with an Irish heritage, allegedly based on a recipe created at Lett's Brewery in Enniscorthy, Ireland, in 1864. The beer is named after George Killian Lett, the great-grandson of George Henry Lett, who founded the brewery in Enniscorthy. George Killian Lett died at the age of 84 in Enniscorthy, Ireland in December 2010. It was originally an Irish red ale called "Enniscorthy Ruby Ale," and was brewed from 1864 until the brewery closed in 1956. It is no longer sold in Ireland.

The brand name "George Killian's" was purchased from Lett's by the Pelforth Brewery (Heineken France) in France. In the mid-1980s, Coors acquired the rights to use the brand name "George Killian's Irish Red" in the United States. While the name is most often associated with its present American incarnation as a 5.2% alcohol by volume amber lager, the beer was originally marketed by Coors (d/b/a Unibev Ltd.) as a 4.9% ABV red ale. Due to its popularity, Killian's is credited with popularizing the term "Irish red ale", despite the fact that it is a lager.

George Killian's is currently available in bottles, cans, and kegs. A 12-ounce (355 ml) serving of George Killian's has 162 calories (677 kJ) and 5.2% ABV.

=== Awards ===
- 1997 – Great American Beer Festival silver medalist, American-Style Amber Lager
- 1998 – Brewer's Association Beer Cup gold medalist, American-Style Amber Lager
- 1998 – Great American Beer Festival silver medalist, American-Style Amber Lager

== George Killian's Bière Rousse ==
Heineken France's brand is a 6.5% ABV Irish red ale marketed under the name "George Killian's Bière Rousse: Bière Spéciale de Tradition Irlandaise." It is currently brewed in the Heineken breweries of Schiltigheim and Marseille.
