= Creemore Springs =

Brewery In Ontario, Canada

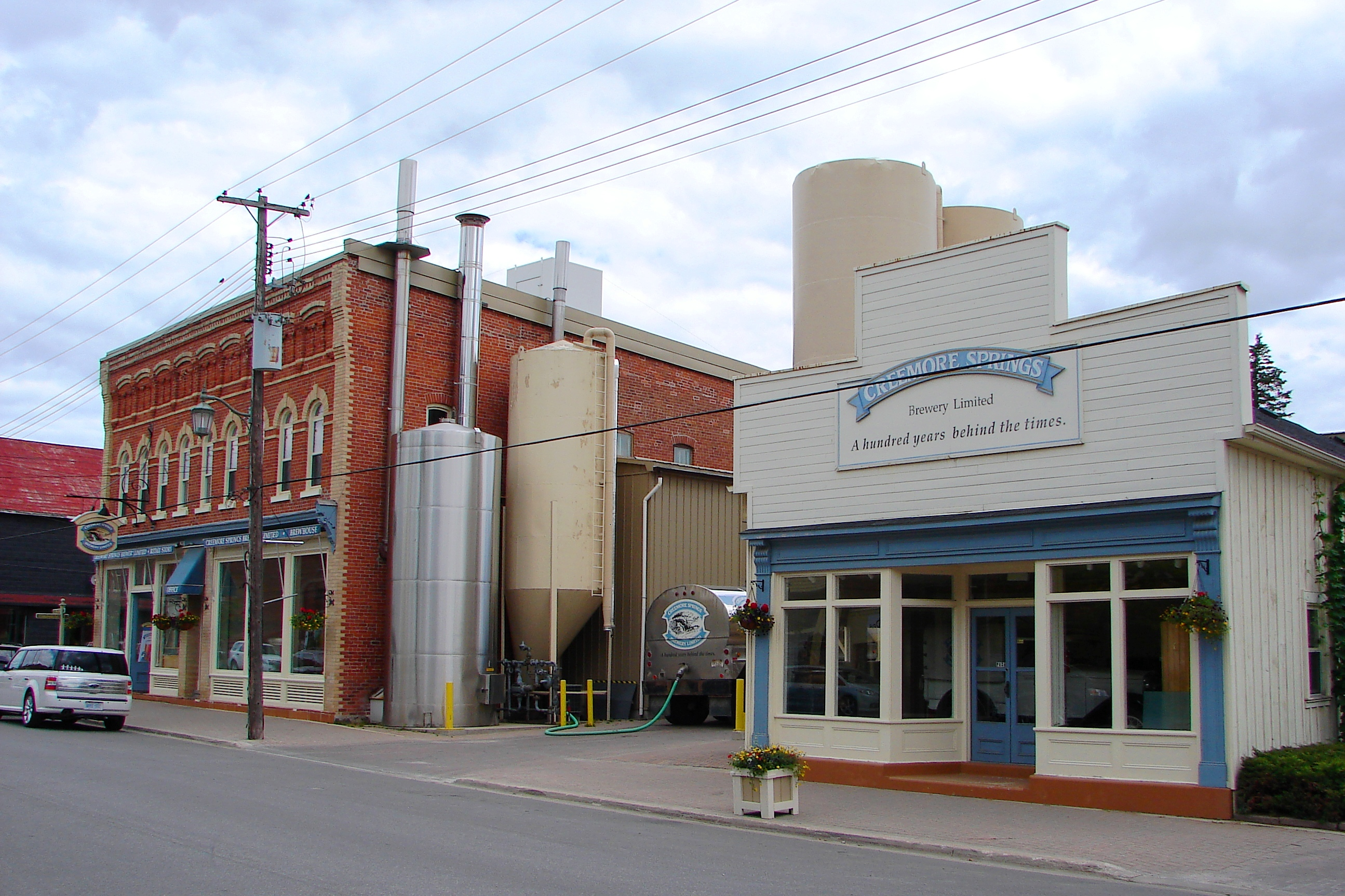
- Creemore Springs brewery in Creemore
- Industry: Alcoholic beverage
- Founded: 1987
- Headquarters: Creemore, Ontario Canada
- Products: Beer
- Owner: Molson Coors Beverage Company

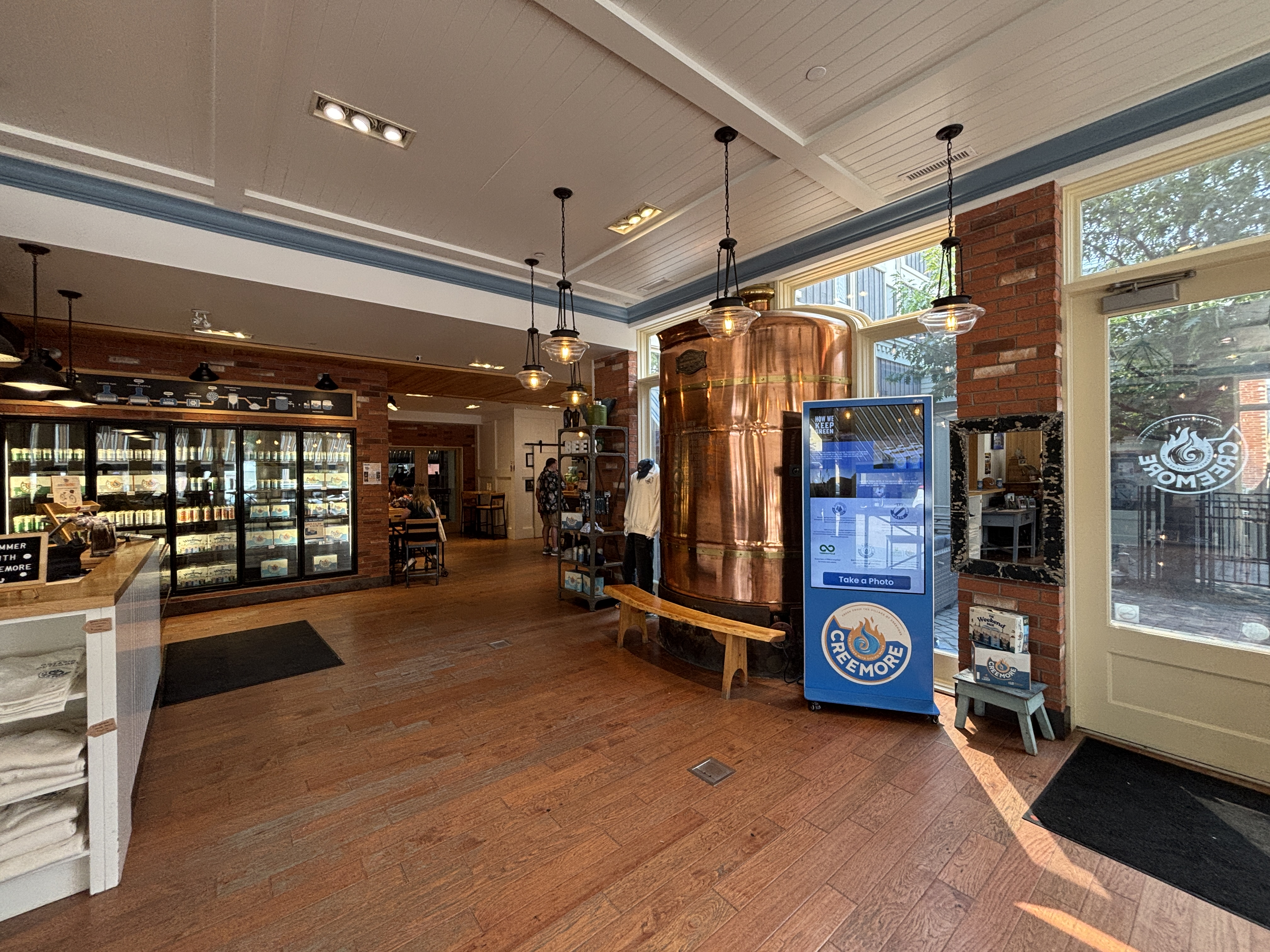
Shop inside

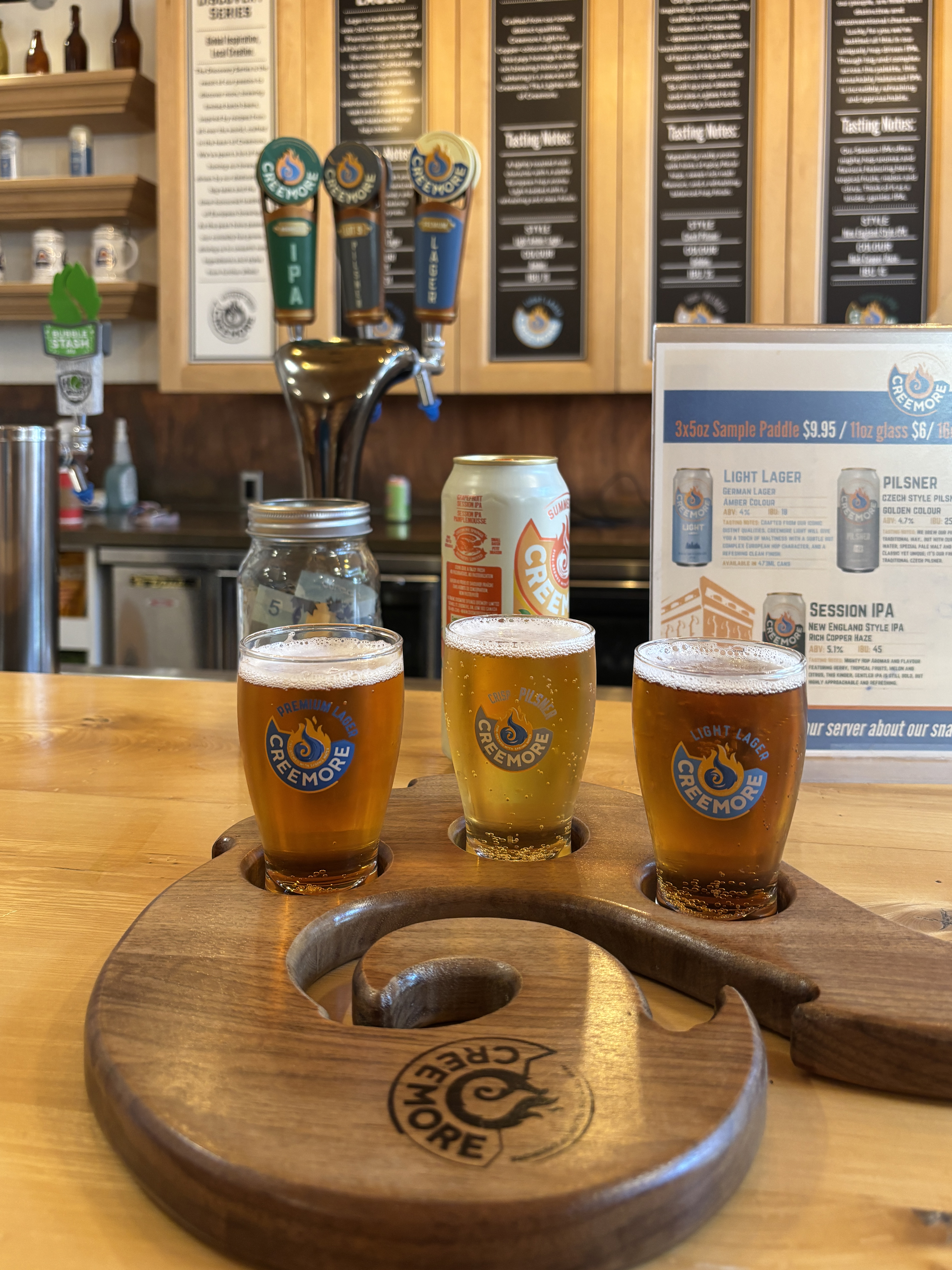
Lager

Creemore Springs is a brewery in Creemore, Ontario, Canada, which first opened in 1987. It was founded by John Wiggins, and its flagship brew was a premium amber lager brewed with specialty malts, fire brewed in a copper kettle. In 2005, it was acquired by Molson, a subsidiary of the seventh largest (at the time) brewery corporation in the world, Molson Coors Brewing Company.

The brewery is known for not using preservatives during the brew process or pasteurizing afterwards. Because of this, it recommends perpetual refrigeration. The brewery states that it uses only four ingredients in its brewing process: malted barley, hops, water, and yeast. These are the four ingredients allowed to be in beer according to the Bavarian Purity Law, which all Creemore Springs beers follow. The brewery uses water exclusively from an artesian well in its brewing process. The water comes from the Creemore Spring located on one of the founder's property. It is trucked from the source to the brewery daily in 10,000 L truckloads; each truckload contains enough water to brew one batch. The beer is brewed in small batches.

Its flagship premium lager is an American amber with affinities to a Czech pilsener.

It was the second Ontario brewer – after Hockley Valley – to offer its product for sale in cans.

In March 2016, Creemore Springs opened Batch, a 2,500-square-foot 'gastrobrewery' (serving beer and food); this location is making six small-batch beers on site.

In 2009, Creemore Springs applied for planning permission to expand its plant by 60% to triple its brewing capacity to 150,000 hL per year. The location of such a large industrial plant in downtown Creemore generated debate. Subsequently, the company lost its status as a member of the Ontario Craft Brewers Association. Considering that aspect, and the ownership by a multi-national, the expansion into Quebec (marketing but not brewing in that province, since 2013), as well as the volume of beer produced, Creemore Springs may no longer be categorized as a craft brewery.

In 2019, Creemore Springs introduced a new logo and package design, its first major branding change since the brewery was founded. The change was controversial, and even received criticism from John Wiggins, the brewery's founder.

The brewery currently operates with a 130,000 hL brewing capacity and employs a team of over 100 people.

== Products ==
- Premium Lager
- Light Lager
- Session IPA
- Crisp Pilsner
- Lot 9 Pilsner
- Boundless IPA
- Mad & Noisy Lagered Ale
- Mad & Noisy Orange Pale Ale
- Mad & Noisy Coconut Porter

== See also ==
- Beer in Canada
- List of breweries in Canada
