= Molson Export =

Canadian ale brewed by Molson

Molson Export beer is a Canadian ale brewed by Molson at a strength of 5% alcohol by volume. It was first brewed in 1903 and is the oldest Molson beer brand still in production.

== Recipe ==
Export is made using several varieties of two-row malted barley, an ale yeast strain dating back to the foundation of the Molson Brewery, and Golding and Oregon hops.

== Prizes and awards ==
Best beer in its category

- Molson Export won the gold medal in the Best North American Style Blonde/Golden Ale category at the 2010 Canadian Brewing Awards.
- Molson Export also took part in the 2011 World Quality Selections, organized by Monde Selection, an Independent International Institute based in Brussels, Belgium. Molson Export won a Gold Award in 2011 and 2001.

For the 2022 Winter Olympics, Molson created a line of maple syrup infused with beer. The Dark Grade syrup was infused with Molson Export.
