= Molson Coors =

Multinational beverage and brewing company

Molson Coors Beverage Company
- Formerly: Schuler & Coors Golden Brewery (1873–1880); Adolph Coors, Golden Brewery (1880–1913); Adolph Coors Brewing and Malting Company (1913–1920); Adolph Coors Company (1920–2005); Molson Coors Brewing Company (2005–2019)
- Type: Public
- Traded as: NYSE: TAP.A (Class A); NYSE: TAP (Class B; limited voting rights); S&P 600 component (TAP); NYSE: RKY (1975–2005)
- Industry: Drink industry
- Founded: November 14, 1873; 153 years ago February 9, 2005; 21 years ago (as Molson Coors)
- Headquarters: Chicago, Illinois (Note: Operational headquarters); Golden, Colorado (Note: Executive headquarters), United States
- Number of locations: Montréal, Québec, Canada
- Key people: Geoff Molson (chairman); David Coors (vice chairman); Rahul Goyal (president and CEO)
- Products: Beer, malt beverages, energy drinks, spirits and wines
- Revenue: ▼US$13.0 billion (2025)
- Operating income: ▼US$−2.3 billion (2025)
- Net income: ▼US$−2.1 billion (2025)
- Total assets: ▼US$22.7 billion (2025)
- Total equity: ▼US$10.2 billion (2025)
- Number of employees: 16,200 (2025)
- Divisions: Molson Coors North America; Molson Coors Europe
- Subsidiaries: Molson Coors Canada; Coors Brewing Company; Miller Brewing Company; The Beer Store (49%)
- Website: molsoncoors.com

Molson Coors Beverage Company is a Canadian-American multinational drink and brewing company. The company is the fifth-largest brewer worldwide by beer output. Its operational headquarters are in Chicago with offices in Prague for the EMEA division and in Golden, Colorado for its US division and Montréal, Québec for its Canadian division.

Notable Molson Coors brands include Blue Moon, Carling, Coors Banquet, Coors Light, George Killian's Irish Red, Granville Island Brewing, Hamm's, Hop Valley, Icehouse, Jelen, Keystone, Leinenkugel's, Miller High Life, Miller Lite, Milwaukee's Best, Molson Canadian, Molson Export, Ožujsko pivo, Staropramen, Steel Reserve, Terrapin, Trebjesa brewery, Vizzy Hard Seltzer, Madrí, and Zoa energy. Breweries owned include the Molson Brewery in Longueuil, Quebec, Blue Moon Brewing Company in Denver, Colorado, Borsod Brewery in Bőcs, Hungary, Coors Brewery in Golden, Colorado, Creemore Springs in Creemore, Ontario, Fraser Valley Brewery in Chilliwack, British Columbia, Leinenkugel Brewery in Chippewa Falls, Wisconsin, Miller Brewery in Milwaukee, Wisconsin, Pardubice Brewery in Pardubice, Czech Republic, Staropramen Brewery in Prague, Czech Republic, and Coors Brewers in Burton upon Trent, England.

Molson Coors is listed on the New York Stock Exchange while its Canadian division is traded on the Toronto Stock Exchange.

== History ==
In July 2004, Molson and Coors announced a merger to form Molson Coors Brewing Company; it was completed in February 2005. Molson Brewery was started by John Molson in Montreal in 1786. In 2016, Molson Coors acquired Miller Brewing Company for approximately US$12 billion. Coors Brewing Company was started by Adolph Coors in Golden, Colorado, in 1873.

Molson Coors acquired Creemore Springs Brewery in April 2005. The operations of Molson Coors in Brazil were sold to FEMSA in 2006.

In June 2008, SABMiller and Molson Coors Brewing Company combined their U.S. brewing operations in a joint venture, MillerCoors. SABMiller had 58% stake in the company, and Molson Coors had a 42% stake.

In February 2011, the company purchased Sharp's Brewery of Cornwall in England for £20 million. In June 2012, the company expanded into the Central and Eastern European markets by acquiring StarBev from CVC Capital Partners.

In September 2015, Anheuser-Busch Inbev announced a merger with SABMiller. To gain regulatory approval, the U.S. Department of Justice required the company to sell its stake in MillerCoors, including Miller Brewing Company; the stake was acquired by Molson Coors in October 2016. The deal made Molson Coors the largest brewer in North America. In January 2018, the company acquired Aspall Cider.

In October 2019, the company announced it would change its name to Molson Coors Beverage Company as a part of a restructuring to take place in 2020. The name change would reflect the company's growing focus on beverages outside of the traditional beer and brewing offerings. The company also retired the MillerCoors corporate brand name and reorganized its global business units into Molson Coors North America, with administrative headquarters in Chicago, and Molson Coors Europe, with administrative headquarters in Prague.

On February 26, 2020, in the Milwaukee brewery shooting, six people, including the shooter, were killed at a shooting near the company's Milwaukee brewing campus, a site for some of the company's corporate offices and brewing facilities and previously the headquarters for the Miller Brewing Company before it was acquired by Molson Coors.

In September 2020, Molson Coors and D. G. Yuengling & Son announced a joint venture to brew and package Yuengling beers in select Molson Coors’ breweries under Yuengling brewers’ supervision, and distribute them into new markets.

Molson Coors began offering whiskey including Five Trail Blended American Whiskey in 2021 and Barmen 1873 Bourbon in 2022. In August 2023, Molson Coors acquired Blue Run, a whiskey company based in Georgetown, Kentucky. It then established a new division, Coors Spirits Co.

In November 2024, the company acquired a majority stake in Zoa energy drinks. In December 2024, the company acquired Cruz Blanca. In January 2025, the company acquired an 8.5% stake in Fever-Tree Drinks. In September 2025, Rahul Goyal was appointed CEO of the company. In late 2025, the company eliminated 400 salaried positions in the Americas, approximately 9% of its workforce in that division. In April 2026, the company acquired Atomic Brands, which makes Monaco Cocktails.
