= Macham =

Macham is a surname. Notable people with the surname include:

- Dorothy Macham (1910-2002), Canadian nursing sister
- Mary Ann Macham (1802-1893), enslaved American woman who escaped to England
- Annie Macham (died 1886), wife of Archibald Currie (Canadian politician)
- Anna Macham, precentor of Salisbury Cathedral as of 2026

== See also ==
- IRIS Macham, ship of Iranian navy
