= J. C. Morrison (steamship) =

Canadian side-wheel steamship

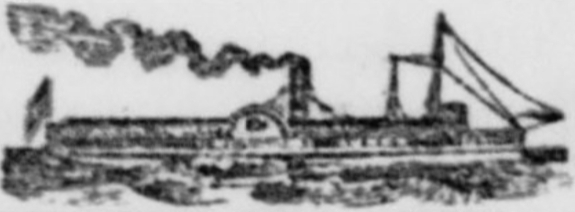
- 1855 printed lithograph of J. C. Morrison

History

British North America
- Name: J. C. Morrison
- Namesake: Joseph Curran Morrison
- Owner: Ontario, Simcoe & Huron Railroad Company
- Operator: Captain Fellows (1855 - 1856), Captain Charles T. Bell (1856 - 1857)
- Port of registry: Belle Ewart
- Route: Steamboat route, Lake Simcoe
- Ordered: Before October, 1853
- Builder: Hugh Chisholm, Mr. Porter (first name unknown)
- Cost: Between $18,000 and $20,000
- Laid down: 1854
- Launched: August 26, 1854
- Maiden voyage: June 30, 1855
- In service: June 30, 1855
- Out of service: August 4, 1857
- Fate: Caught fire, sank

General characteristics
- Tons burthen: 150
- Length: 150 ft (46 m)
- Beam: 24 ft (7.3 m)
- Height: At least 24 ft (7.3 m)
- Installed power: Roughly 500 HP
- Propulsion: One vertical beam steam engine
- Speed: 18 mph (16 kn; 29 km/h)
- Capacity: Over 200
- Crew: At least 4

J. C. Morrison was a side-wheel steamship that ran for the Ontario, Simcoe and Huron Railroad Company between 1855 and 1857. On August 5, 1857, the ship caught fire and sank just offshore from Centennial Beach in Barrie, Ontario, and her wreck now serves as a popular scuba diving site.

== Background ==
Joseph Curran Morrison, or J. C. Morrison as it was usually called, was built for the Ontario, Simcoe and Huron Railroad Company. The Ontario, Simcoe and Huron Railroad Company believed that they could Pioneer the lake, as they have pioneered Ontario grounds with their widely popular steam train service. The company went into partnership with the Bell Ewart shipyards to use them for building a brand new steamship.

== Construction ==
The Ontario, Simcoe and Huron Railroad Company hired Captain Hugh Chisholm of the steamer Woodman and Mr. Porter (first name unknown) to design the ship. The keel was laid in 1854. She was named Joseph Curran Morrison after the president of the Ontario, Simcoe and Huron Railroad Company at the time. Her furnishings were fitted out by the Jaques and Hay Furniture Company from Toronto, her 25-foot (7.6 m) tall beam engine and boiler were designed by Gartshore & Company and her silverware was manufactured by W. Adams & Sons. The ship was 150 feet (46 m) long with a 24-foot (7.3 m) beam, had a total tonnage of 150, and her 20-foot (6.1 m) paddle wheels could make the vessel travel at 18 miles per hour (16 kn; 29 km/h). By June 30, 1855, J. C. Morrison was fully completed with a final cost of between $18,000 and $20,000 (roughly $698,411 today).

=== Launch ===
The launch of J. C. Morrison on August 26, 1854, was nearly a disaster in itself. A crowd of 5,000 people turned up to the Belle Ewart shoreline to watch the hull of the ship as it was launched. J. C. Morrison was launched by Mrs. Morrison, Joseph Morrison's wife. The ship only made it halfway down the slipway before the hull stopped moving, stuck in place. It was decided to have the company's other steamer, Morning, tow the ship out into the water. J. C. Morrison was finally launched into the water after one of the ropes tying it to the steamer Morning snapped, and a group of men used a cut-down tree as a lever to push the ship.

== Career ==
J. C. Morrison was chartered for the summer of 1855 under the command of Captain Fellows. On June 30, 1855, the ship sailed her maiden voyage. The ship's main purpose was to transport passengers, mail, and cargo between Jackson's Point, Beaverton, Atherley, Orillia, Port Bolster, and Hawkstone before returning to Belle Ewart, on time for her passengers to make connections with the steam trains.

J. C. Morrison became very popular among the local community, so she was eventually chartered for night cruises under the command of Captain Bell at the price of $3 (roughly $150 today). The sudden success was in part because of her speed. She was much more comfortable than anything many of her passengers have seen all their lives, having stained glass windows and comfortable velvet sofas.

=== Mishaps during her career ===
J. C. Morrison suffered a few mishaps within her career, some of which were massive embarrassments for her owners and the ship itself. Her rudder was stiff, making the ship difficult to steer quickly, and she was top-heavy. Within her career she collided with small sail boats, and the light-weighted build of the ship meant that it was easily swept off course. On August 11, 1855, the ship ran aground on the Atherly Narrows and was left there with a full load of passengers. Only having berths for a fraction of its current load, many passengers slept in the lounges and dining saloons until the smaller steamer Morning arrived to pick them up the following day.

== Final voyage ==
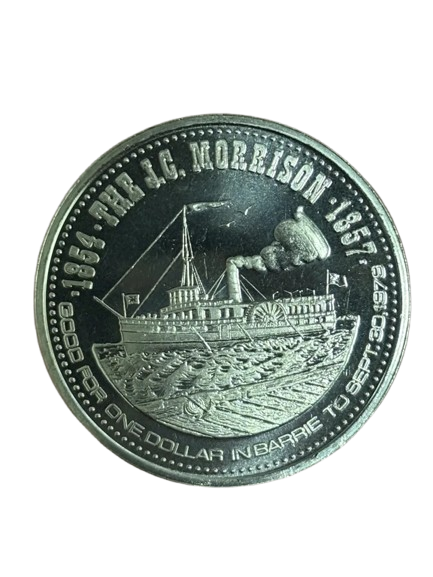
1979 Collector's coin featuring J. C. Morrison

Captain Bell gave the all clear for J. C. Morrison to depart from Belle Ewart at 10:00 a.m. on August 4, 1857. She had a relatively uneventful voyage, following her usual Belle Ewart route. At 7:00 p.m. the ship docked at Allendale Station with intent to leave early the next morning for Belle Ewart. At 7:30 p.m., Captain Bell declared his ship safe and secure, and allowed passengers to depart. He departed the ship to meet with a committee so he could plan out a pleasure cruise later in the week. Captain Bell arrived back to the ship at 11:30 p.m. and went to bed, noting that he seemed to be the only one awake at the time.

== Loss ==
On August 5, 1857, J. C. Morrison was docked at Allendale Station overnight with passengers asleep in their berths. At around 12:30 AM, one of the firemen was woken up and ordered to head up on deck. The fireman saw fire spreading from the ship's boiler while he was on his way up so he sounded the alarm. Captain Bell, still in his nightgown, assessed the situation as it unfolded in front of him. He gave the order to abandon ship and began to wake his passengers. A young woman who was asleep when the fire started had some difficulty evacuating the ship. Only a few minutes passed before the entire ship was in flames, and it was feared that Captain Bell would not make it off the ship himself. Captain Bell eventually saved himself from the burning J. C. Morrison after evacuating every last passenger on board.

Firefighters quickly made it on the scene and decided to let the ship go out on the lake to burn without the risk of nearby buildings going up in flames. As they did, a light breeze began to push the ship farther north than intended, causing the vessel to land at one of the many wharves on the north side of Barrie. She was let go once more, burning with such intensity that buildings on the shoreline were lit up by the reflection of the flames. J. C. Morrison finally plunged after an hour and a half of burning, described with a "loud hissing noise".

Nothing was saved from J. C. Morrison with the exception of some cash and a few account books, which were saved by the ship's purser. The cause of the fire was never determined by officials. Documented personal losses included the Rolfe family, who lost a large number in cash, and the Sutherland family who lost a $130 gold watch (roughly $4,764 today). Both families also lost all of their clothing and had to borrow or take donations in clothing following the fire. Captain Bell also lost a watch and important business documents. Of all the losses, only $1,000 was paid by insurance (roughly $36,759 today).

== Following the sinking ==
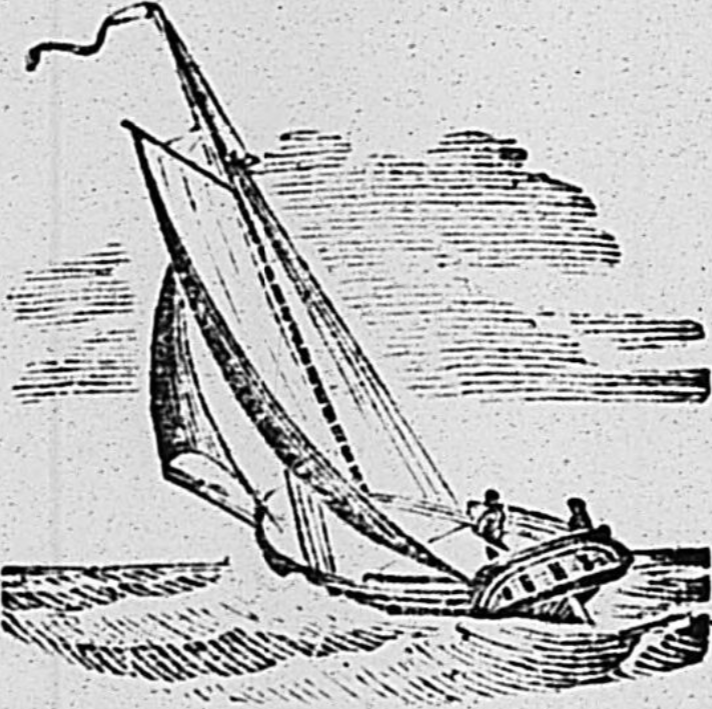
1857 lithograph of a Lake Simcoe Boat Club Regatta

Immediately following the loss of J. C. Morrison, an unknown boat club located the wreck and removed the paddle wheels from the site and into deeper waters so it would not damage any of their boats on the wreck. In 1997, one of the paddle wheels were found near the site of the wreck, but its arrival at the site is undocumented. It is possible that the boat club was forced to re-locate it and return it to the wreck. Only a month after the fire, in September 1857, a decision was made to raise the wreck. The reason why this never happened is unknown. In October 1860, Captain Charles Fortin recovered J. C. Morrison's boiler with intent to re-use it on a new steamship, Emily May. After being abandoned in 1883, Emily May lies rotting near Belle Ewart. For nearly a year after the fire, the latest report being from May 1858, the wreck was still plainly visible above the surface in Lake Simcoe.

A cruise to Orillia from Belle Ewart for a party of 200 people was supposed to take place on board J. C. Morrison on August 22, 1857, but because the steamer was burnt, the company's other steamer, Morning, was scheduled as a replacement. The party and cruise included live music, specially decorated railway cars to the dock at Belle Ewart, a half hour sightseeing cruise around Lake Couchiching, and many toasts to drink.

=== Wreck and artifacts ===
In 1974, two Innisfil scuba divers located the broken up wreck of J. C. Morrison. They noted that the wreck was split into three main sections- the bow, mid-ships, and the stern, the latter was mostly intact. Artifacts were recovered and put on display at the Simcoe County Museum, including silverware and glasses made by W. Adams & Sons, pottery, and a flintlock pistol which was used to identify the wreck. A tobacco pipe still remains on the site. The wreck is mostly used as a training site for amateur scuba divers in Simcoe County.

As of May 2025, the aft keel, a paddle wheel and part of the engine still remain. It is estimated that some divers visit the wreck around 50 times a year. One of the main attractions for divers at the wreck of J. C. Morrison are the kinds of fish and wildlife that use the wreck as an artificial reef. The most common ones include smallmouth bass, crayfish, algae and zebra mussels. The latter has nearly completely engulfed the wreck. In 1979, a $1 collectable coin was made in remembrance to the 125th anniversary of the ship's launch, featuring an engraving of the ship on one side. It was good to use until September 30, 1979.
