= Events of national historic significance =

Event designation by Canada's Minister of the Environment

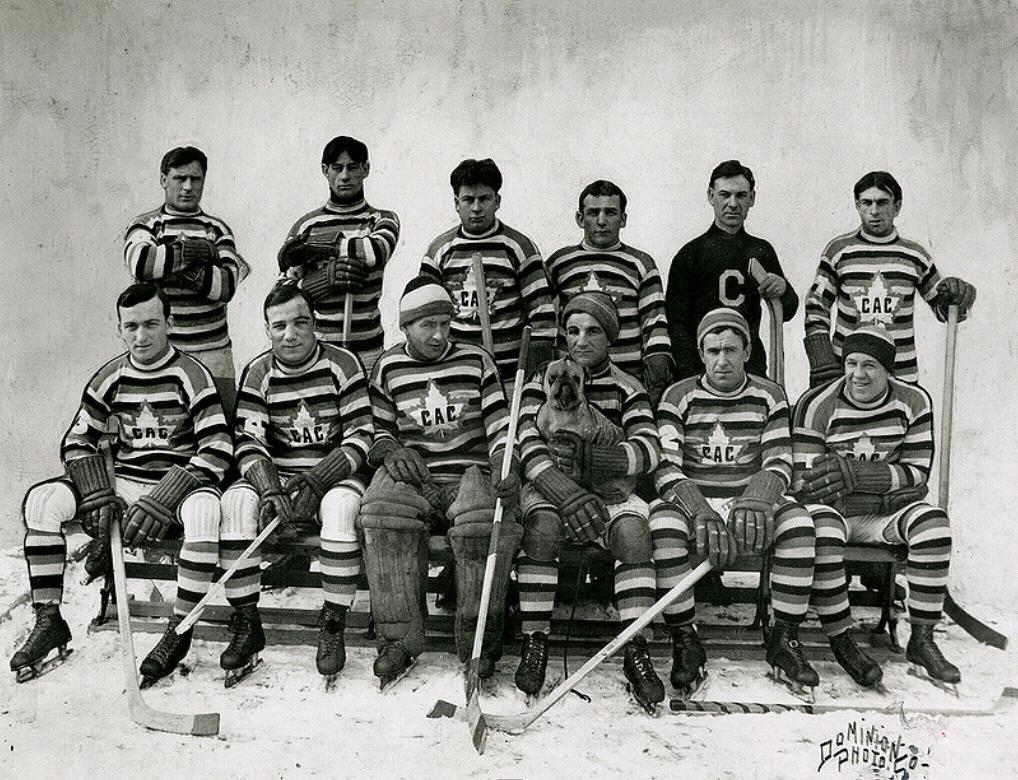
The years of triumphs and tribulations of the Montreal Canadiens, seen here during the 1912–13 season, were designated the Club de hockey Canadien national historic event in 2008.

The events of national historic significance, also called national historic events (French: événements d'importance historique nationale), are events that have been designated by Canada's government, on the advice of the national Historic Sites and Monuments Board to the Minister of Environment and Climate Change, as being defining actions, episodes, movements or experiences in Canadian history. To be designated, an event must have occurred at least forty (40) years previous; events that continue into the more recent past are evaluated on the basis of what occurred at least 40 years ago. As of November 2025, there are 523 National Historic Events that are already recorded.

Related federal designations exist for National Historic Sites and National Historic Persons. Events, Sites, and Persons are each typically marked by a federal plaque, but the markers do not indicate which designation a subject has been given. The Welland Canal is an Event, while the Rideau Canal is a Site. The cairn and plaque to John Macdonell does not refer to a National Historic Person, but is erected because his home, Glengarry House, is a National Historic Site. Similarly, the plaque to John Guy officially marks not a Person, but an Event—the Landing of John Guy.

Events have been designated in all ten provinces and three territories, as well as Belgium, China, France, Italy, the Netherlands, South Korea, the United Kingdom, and the United States.

== List ==
As of November 2025, there are 523 National Historic Events recorded. The "Location" column identifies the place where an event happened or, in the case of widespread or non-specific locations, marks the place where a federal plaque to the event is located or is likely to be located, if known.

Event	Date of Event	Location	Year designated
Attack at Grand-Pré	1747	Grand-Pré, NS	1924
Cabot's Landfall in the New World	1497	Cape Bonavista, NL and Cape North, NS	1958
Windsor Agricultural Fair	1765 (started)	Windsor, NS	1935
Calgary Stampede	1912 (started)	Calgary, AB	2012
First Dairy School in Canada	1882 (started)	Saint-Denis-de-La Bouteillerie, QC	1953
Displacement of the Anishinaabeg of Southern Georgian Bay	1829–1840	Coldwater and Beausoleil Island, ON	2011
Voyageurs		Sainte-Anne-de-Bellevue, QC	1938
Inuit Co-operative Movement in Canada	1959–1968	Kangiqsualujjuaq (George River), QC	2011
1972 Summit Series	1972	Montreal, Toronto, Winnipeg, Vancouver	2012
Immigration to Canada	ongoing	national	1984
Canadian Federation of University Women	1919–1970	Winnipeg, MB	2011
Thule Migration	1000–1300	Alaska to YT, NT, NU	1978
Hogg's Hollow Disaster	1960	Toronto, ON	2011
Transportation in the Yukon		Whitehorse, YT	1967
Cercles de fermières	1915–1968	Plessisville, QC	2011
Battle of Sainte-Foy	1760	Quebec, QC	2011
Fur Trade		Lachine, QC	1968
Capitulation of Montréal	1760	Montreal, QC	1952
Manufacturing in Canada		national	1987
Canoe Routes of Canada		national	1958
Siege of Quebec, 1759	1759	Quebec, QC	2011
Seigneurial System		Saint-Jean-d'Orléans, QC	1984
Great Lakes Fisheries	1800s	Port Dover, ON	1983
Sisters of Charity of Ottawa	1845 (founded)	Ottawa, ON	1988
Arrival of Foreign Protestants in Nova Scotia (1749–1756)	1749–1756	Halifax, NS	2011
Postal Service	1693 (first courier); 1763 (regular service)	Montreal, QC	1927
Columbia Express	1820s–1855	York Factory, MB, to Pacific coast	2011
Aboriginal Military Service in the First World War	1914–1920	national	2011
Arrival and Settlement of Hungarians at Esterhazy-Kaposvar	1886–1931	Esterhazy, SK	2007
Franco-Aboriginal Alliance of 1603	1603	Baie-Sainte-Catherine, QC	2005
Craig's Road	1810	Richmond, QC	1939
Brothers of the Christian Schools	1840s	Montreal, QC	1988
Arctic Exploration and Inuit Culture		the North	1972
Niagara Land Purchases	1781–1792	Niagara-on-the-Lake, ON	1928
Athabasca Trail	1875	Edmonton, AB	1957
Congrégation de Notre-Dame	1650 (founded)	Montreal, QC	1988
Railway Rolling Stock		Saint-Constant, QC	1961
The Grey Cup	1909 (started)	Toronto, ON	2012
Girl Guide Movement in Canada	1910 (established)	Toronto, ON	2011
Establishment of the Canadian Youth Hostel at Bragg Creek, Alberta	1933 (established)	Bragg Creek, AB	2011
Marquis de Malauze (vessel)	1760	Ristigouche, QC	1943
Experience of Italian Sojourners	1890–1914	Montreal, QC	2011
Canadian Participation in the Royal Flying Corps	1916–1918	Ontario	2012
Establishment of the Halifax Zoological Garden	1847 (established)	Halifax, NS	1948
Île-aux-Coudres	1535	Île-aux-Coudres, QC	1925
Hydro-Electric Power Development in Canada		national	1987
Coming of the New England Planters (Pre-Loyalists)	1760–1763	Horton Landing, NS	1958
Settlement of Viger by Maliseets	1827	Saint-Épiphane, QC	2002
Co-operative Union of Canada	1909 (established)	Ontario	1984
Survey of Prince Edward Island	1764–1766	Holland Cove, PE	1932
Establishment of the Polymer Corporation	1942 (established)	Sarnia, ON	2005
Bank Fishery		Lunenburg, NS	1966
Indian Treaty N^{o} 3	1873	Kenora, ON	1943
Oil and Gas Extraction	1947–1953	Leduc, AB	1955
Pacific Cable	1902 (completed)	Bamfield, BC	1927
First Canadian House of Assembly	1758	Halifax, NS	1957
Nipigon River Forts	1678 and 1727	Nipigon River, ON	1944
Winning of Responsible Government	1855	St. John's, NL	1954
Temiscouata Portage	1746 (French route)	Cabano, QC	1925
Old Town Victoria	1800s	Victoria, BC	1990
Covered Bridges	1860s–20th century	eastern Canada	1977
Construction of Yonge Street	1795 (begun)	Oak Ridges, ON	1927
Creation of the Dominion Parks Branch	1911	Banff National Park, AB	2011
Whaling Industry in Eastern Arctic	1820–1910	Kekerten Island, NU	1983
Nanaimo	1852	Nanaimo, BC	1924
Battle of Signal Hill	1762	St. John's, NL	1959
Japanese Canadian Soldiers of the First World War and the Fight to Win the Vote	1916–1918	Vancouver, BC	2011
Landing of United Empire Loyalists in New Brunswick	1783	Saint John, NB	1923
Battle of Montmorency	1759	Quebec, QC	1951
Black Pioneers Immigration to Alberta and Saskatchewan	1908–1940	Alberta and Saskatchewan	2007
Return of the Acadians	after 1755	Sainte-Anne-du-Bocage, NB	1955
Chemin Royal	1734	Quebec, QC	1927
Battle of Petitcodiac	1755	Hillsborough, NB	1928
Naval Encounter	1745	Tatamagouche, NS	1938
104th Regiment	1813–1814	Fredericton, NB	1934
Introduction of Multilingual Multicultural Radio Stations in Canada	1966	Toronto and Montreal	2011
Lachine Massacre	1689	Lachine, QC	1923
Gananoque	1812–1814	Gananoque, ON	1936
Forest Industry in the Ottawa Valley	1806–1850s	Ottawa, ON	1985
Moravian Missions and the Inuit in Labrador		Newfoundland and Labrador	2011
Grenville Canal	1819–1833 (built); 1871–1882 (enlarged)	Grenville, QC	1929
Brant's Ford		Brantford, ON	1927
Abenaki Basket-Making Industry, 1870–1920	1870–1920	Quebec	2011
Meductic-Eel River Portage		Meductic, NB	1943
Battleford-Swift Current Trail	1885	Swift Current, SK	1954
Welch Company	1895–1970	Thunder Bay, ON	2011
Yorkshire Immigration	1772–1776	Aulac, NB	1925
Ursulines of Trois-Rivières	1697 (began)	Trois-Rivières, QC	1997
Poutrincourt's Mill	1607	Lequille, NS	1947
National Farm Radio Forum		Toronto, ON	2009
Distribution of King's Presents, 17th–19th centuries	17th–19th centuries	Quebec	2011
Food and Agriculture Organization	1945	Quebec, QC	1955
Defence of York	1813	Toronto, ON	1924
Prince Edward Island Land Question	1767–1866	Charlottetown, PE	1988
Sisters of Providence	1843 (founded)	Montreal, QC	1988
First Cheese Factory	1864	Ingersoll, ON	1931
Whaling Industry in Western Arctic		Herschel Island, NT	1972
Refugees of the 1956 Hungarian Revolution	1956	national	2010
Galt Irrigation Canal	1898–1900 (built)	Magrath, AB	1983
Dawson Road	1858–1871	Ste. Anne, MB	1933
Sinking of the S.S. VALENCIA	1906	Pacific Rim National Park Reserve, BC	2008
Tadoussac	1535, 1600, 1603	Tadoussac, QC	1923
First Legislature of Manitoba	1871	Winnipeg, MB	1943
First Export of Coal	before 1650	Minto, NB	1929
Founding of the Bois-Francs by Charles Héon	1825	Saint-Louis-de-Blandford, QC	1925
Winterhousing	early 18th – mid-20th centuries	Deep Cove, NL	1990
Accommodation (Vessel)	1809	Montreal, QC	1925
Pulp and paper industry in Canada	19th, 20th centuries	regional	1987
Roseau Route	1733	Letellier, MB	1934
Battle of Île-aux-Noix	1813	Île-aux-Noix, QC	1923
First Air Crossing of the Canadian Rockies	1919	Richmond, BC	1961
Cascades Canal	1779–1783	Pointe-des-Cascades, QC	1929
Exploitation of the Nova Scotia Coal Fields	late 19th, 20th centuries	Nova Scotia region	1998
Group of Seven	1920 (first exhibition)	Kleinburg, ON	1974
Establishment of the Maritime Wireless Telegraph System	1904	Pointe-à-la-Renommée, QC	2011
Selkirk Settlement	1803	Belfast, PE	1954
Persons Case	1929	Edmonton, AB	1997
Application of Direct Drive Waterpower		national	1986
Chaudière Portages	1613–mid-1800s	Gatineau, QC	1927
Jesuit Fathers	1635–1759, 1842 onward	Montreal, QC	1988
Lachine Rapids		Lachine, QC	1982
Canadians and the Normandy Landing	1944	Bernières-sur-Mer, France	1999
Ste. Croix Island	1604	Saint Croix Island, ME, United States	1968
Nlaka'pamux Basket-Making, Pre-Contact to 1970		British Columbia region	2011
Canadian Women's Christian Temperance Union	late 19th century	national	1997
Intercolonial Railway	1876	Moncton, NB	1976
Pioneer Fox Farming	1880–1910	Alberton, PE	1939
Discovery of Prince Edward Island	1534	Alberton, PE	1924
Queen's University	1842 (founded)	Kingston, ON	1991
Chambly Road	1665	Saint-Hubert, QC	1929
First Banding of a Bird	1905	Toronto, ON	1955
Role of Placentia	1662–1713	Placentia, NL	1951
National Council of Jewish Women of Canada		Toronto, ON	2008
Fort de Lévis	1760	Johnstown, ON	1968
Forest Industry in New Brunswick	18th–20th centuries	Saint John, NB	1943
Cornwall Canal	1834–1842 and 1876–1904	Cornwall, ON	1929
Beothuks	before 1829	Grand Falls-Windsor, NL	1955
The Creation of the National Flag	1964–1965	Ottawa, ON	2015
Opening of the St. Lawrence to All Nations	1849	Quebec, QC	1925
First Marine Compound Engine	1845	Saint John, NB	1926
Dominion Telegraph	1874–1878	Humboldt, SK	1943
First Patent in Canada	1824	Quebec, QC	1929
Prairie Settlement Patterns		Prairies	1984
Meetings of Parliament	1916–1919	Ottawa, ON	1949
Cunningham v. Tomey Homma	1902	British Columbia	2011
Sisters of Ste. Anne	1850	Lachine, QC	1988
Butler's Rangers	1777–1784	Niagara-on-the-Lake, ON	1930
Quebec Conferences (1943-1944)	1943–1944	Quebec, QC	1946
Torbay	1762	Torbay, NL	1952
Frog Portage	before 1774 to after 1828	Churchill River, SK	1977
Canadian Naval Aviation during the Cold War		Shearwater, NS	2011
Action at Butler's Farm	1813	Niagara-on-the-Lake, ON	1926
Petitcodiac-Washademoak Portage		Petitcodiac, NB	1936
Grey Nuns of Montréal	1737 and later	Montreal, QC	1988
Welland Canal	1824; 1829–1833 (built); 1841 (rebuilt)	Thorold, ON	1924
Creation of the Province of Alberta	1905	Edmonton, AB	1946
Six Nations	1755–1763; 1775–1783; 1812–1814; 1837–1838	Six Nations Grand River Reserve, ON	1930
Lemuel Sherman Barn / Military Hospital	1813	Thamesville, ON	1954
Red Fife wheat	1842	Keene, ON	1931
Atlantic Charter	1941	Placentia-Ship Harbour, NL	1973
First Sault Ste. Marie Canal	1797–1798	Sault Ste. Marie, ON	1921
Edmonton Grads	1915–1940	Edmonton, AB	1976
Acadian Odyssey	1750s–1881 and after	Memramcook, NB	1976
On-to-Ottawa Trek	1935	Regina, SK	1997
Breaching of the Gothic Line	1944	Rimini, Emilia-Romagna, Italy	2000
Canadian Landing in Sicily	1943	Pachino, Sicily, Italy	2000
Shield Archaic Culture	5000 BC–1000 BC	Labrador to Maine; Port au Choix, NL (discovery)	1981
Engagement at the Forty	1813	Grimsby, ON	1954
Isgonish-French River Portage	18th, 19th centuries	Lower Onslow, NS	1939
Fugitive Slave Movement	1800s 1850–1861 (peak)	Windsor, ON	1925
Canadian Presence in Britain	1939–1945	London, England, United Kingdom	2000
Founding of New Brunswick	1784	Saint John, NB	1934
Hull Timber Slide	1829	Gatineau, QC	1976
Pony Express	1849	Victoria Beach, NS	1950
Founding of Université-Laval	1852	Quebec, QC	1972
W. D. Lawrence (Vessel)	1872–1874 (built)	Maitland, NS	1955
Discovery of the Mackenzie River	1789	Fort Providence, NT	1969
Canada's Capital	1857	Ottawa, ON	1976
Eagle Pass	1865, 1885	Craigellachie, BC	1971
Fifth Thule Expedition	1921–1924	Danish Island, NU	1977
Carbonear Island	1697, 1705	Carbonear, NL	1954
Transatlantic Flights	1919–1937	Harbour Grace, NL	1951
Battle of the St. Lawrence	1942–1944	Forillon National Park, Gaspé, QC	2000
Dominion Lands Survey System	1871	Headingly, MB	1930
Black Loyalist Experience	1783–1792 and after	Birchtown, NS	1994
Franklin D. Roosevelt and Campobello Island	1883–1921; 1933, 1936, 1939	Welshpool, NB	1945
Nancy (vessel)	1814	Wasaga Beach, ON	1923
Henry House	1811–1830s	Jasper National Park, AB	1926
Bluenose	1921–1946	Lunenburg, NS	1952
Caisse Populaire (Mouvement Desjardins)	1900	Lévis, QC	1984
Fédération nationale Saint-Jean-Baptiste	1907	Montreal, QC	2005
Dispersal of Huron-Wendat from Huronia	1650, 1697	Wendake, QC	1997
Canadian Raid on Dieppe	1942	Dieppe, France	2000
Indian Treaty of 1778	1778	Saint John, NB	1971
First Transcontinental Train	1886	Montreal, QC	1939
United Empire Loyalists	late 18th century	Cornwall, ON	1933
Mattawa Route	early 17th – 19th centuries	Mattawa, ON	1926
Surrender of Indian Lands	1798, 1815, 1818	Orillia, ON	1932
Survey of the Great Lakes	1814–1816; 1817–1825	Owen Sound, ON	1933
Shipbuilding in New Brunswick	late 18th – 19th centuries	St. Martins (plaque), Saint John, Moncton, Miramichi, NB	1995
First Electric Telegraph	1846	Toronto, ON	1925
Crawford Purchase	1783	Carleton Island, Kingston, ON (plaque)	1929
Herschel Island	1890–1920s	Herschel Island, YT	1972
Creation of the Province of Manitoba	1870	Winnipeg, MB	1948
Frontier College	1899	Toronto, ON	1998
Building of the St. Clair Tunnel	1889–1891	Sarnia, ON	1992
Construction of the Sambro Island Lighthouse	1758	Sambro Island, NS; Sambro, NS (plaque)	1937
Royal Navy on Lake Champlain	1776–1777; 1812–1814	Fort Lennox National Historic Site, Île-aux-Noix, QC	1927
Slave River Rapids	1789, 1880s, 1940s	Fort Smith, NT	1969
Antigonish Movement	1928	Antigonish, NS	1981
Siege of Quebec in 1775	1775–1776	Quebec, QC	1984
Creation of the North-West Mounted Police National	1873	Fort Walsh, SK	1972
First Paper Mill in Canada / Argenteuil Paper Mill	1803–1805	Saint-André-Est, QC	1925
Good Shepherd Sisters of Québec	1844	Quebec, QC	2010
Missionary Oblates of Mary Immaculate	1841	Ottawa, ON	1988
Japanese Experience in Alberta	1900s	Raymond, AB	2007
Battle of the Scheldt	1944	Walcheren Island, Netherlands	2005
Veterans Charter	1945	Ottawa, ON	1999
Discovery of the Coppermine River	1771	Nunavut	1956
Winning of the Vote by Women	1914, 1916	Winnipeg, MB	1997
Okanagan Brigade Trail	1811–1848	Westbank, BC	1943
Landing of the Trans-Atlantic Submarine Cable	1866	Heart's Content, NL	2001
System of Tide Gates (Aboiteaux)	mid-1600s	Memramcook, NB	1997
Coast Salish Knitters and the Cowichan Sweater	late 19th century	British Columbia	2011
Struggle for Hudson Bay	1686–1713	Ville-Marie, QC	1936
University of Ottawa	1848	Ottawa, ON	1998
Establishment of Fort Maurepas	1739–1749	Pine Falls, MB	1931
Dawson to Ashcroft Telegraph Line	1899	Whitehorse, YT	1994
Anglo-Russian Treaty of 1825	1825	Stewart, BC	1975
Kootenay Mining Region	late 19th century onward	Rossland, BC	1998
Exploration of the Strait of Juan de Fuca	1787, 1792	Victoria, BC	1924
Boundary Water Treaty of 1909	1909	London, ON	1997
Mckee's Purchase	1790	Blenheim, ON	1931
Yukon Gold Discovery	1896	Bonanza Creek, YT	1926
First Butter Factory in Canada	1873	Athelstan, QC	1943
Sisters of the Assumption of the Blessed Virgin Mary	1853	Nicolet, QC	1988
Halifax and Castine	1814–1815	Castine, Maine, USA; Halifax, NS (plaque)	1936
Establishment of New Iceland	1875–1876	Gimli, MB	1999
Oregon Treaty of 1846	1846	Surrey, BC	1946
Fraser Canyon Transportation Corridor	1857–1866 and after	Spuzzum, BC	1985
General Mining Association	1827–1865	Stellarton, NS	1983
Williamsburg Canals System	1844–1856	Morrisburg, ON	1929
Mohawks at Annapolis Royal	1712–1713	Annapolis Royal, NS	1932
Methye Portage	1778–1820	La Loche, SK	1933
Creation of the Province of British Columbia	1871	Victoria, BC	1948
Beginnings of Coal Mining	1720	Port Morien, NS	1959
Exploration of the Fraser River	1791, 1793, 1808	Vancouver, BC	1927
Territorial Grain Growers Association	1902	Indian Head, SK	1953
Royal Montreal Curling Club	1807	Montreal, QC	1953
St. John's Regatta	1826	St. John's, NL	1990
New Westminster	1859–1868	New Westminster, BC	1924
Beaubassin / Ancient Indian Portage		Frosty Hollow, NB	1943
Nineteenth Century Shipbuilding at Quebec	1850s	Quebec, QC	1957
Mi'kmaq on Malpeque Bay	early 19th century onward	Lennox Island, PE	1997
De Havilland 'Beaver'	1946	Toronto, ON	1974
Scouting Movement in Canada	1908	Niagara-on-the-Lake, ON	2009
Mackenzie–Papineau Battalion	1937–1939	Toronto, ON	1985
Sack of Lunenburg	1782	Lunenburg, NS	1950
Toronto Carrying Place	1615–1796	Humber River to Holland River; Rouge River to Holland River; Toronto, ON (plaque)	1969
Deportation of the Inhabitants of Île Saint-Jean	1758	Rocky Point, PE	2011
Landing of John Guy	1610	Cupids, NL	1952
First Legislative Assembly of Upper Canada	1792	Niagara-on-the-Lake, ON	1990
Imperial Order Daughters of the Empire	1900	Toronto, ON	1982
Palliser Expedition	1857–1860	Banff National Park, AB	1957
Crowsnest Pass	1873, 1897	Crowsnest Lake, AB	1971
Transatlantic Wireless	1902	Marconi National Historic Site; Glace Bay, NS	1938
New Brunswick Forest Products Industry	1780s – 20th century	Edmundston, NB	1999
Pro Patria	1812–1814	Amherstburg and Kingston, ON	1928
Canadians in the Korean War	1950–1953	Gapyong-Gun, South Korea	2000
Battle for Ortona	1943	Ortona, Italy	2000
Sisters of the Holy Names of Jesus and Mary	1843	Longueuil, QC	1988
Design and Construction of the Victoria Tubular Bridge	1854–1860	Montreal, QC	1999
Creation of the Province of Saskatchewan	1905	Regina, SK	1939
Shannon and Chesapeake (vessels)	1813	Halifax, NS	1925
Noorduyn Aviation Company 'Norseman'	1935–1960	Dorval, QC	1974
Expulsion of the Acadians	1755–1763	Grand-Pré National Historic Site, Grand Pré, NS	1955
Original Gold Discovery / Discovery Claim	1896, 1897–1898	Bonanza Creek, YT	1959
Treaty of Montréal in 1701	1701	Montreal, QC	2001
Collins' Overland Telegraph		Quesnel, BC	1929
Immigration of the King's Daughters to New France	1663–1673	Quebec, QC	2007
Discovery and Development of the McIntosh Apple	1811	Dundela, ON	1999
Petro Mohyla Institute	1916	Saskatoon, SK	2008
Hôtel-Dieu Saint-Joseph de Tracadie	1849–1965; 1844–1894	Tracadie-Sheila, NB	1992
Immigration of Home Children	1869–1939	Stratford, ON (plaque)	1999
Establishment of the National Council of Women of Canada	1893	Toronto, ON	2000
1954 Voyage of HMCS Labrador	1954	Resolute, NU	1981
Invention of the telephone	1874, 1876	Brantford, ON	1938
Midwives of New France	before 1759	Quebec, QC	2007
American Military Presence in Newfoundland	1940	Argentia, NL	1988
First Military Test Flights	1909	Petawawa, ON	1951
Japanese Canadian Internment	1942–1949	Vancouver, BC (plaque)	1984
War Brides	1942–1948	Halifax, NS (plaque)	1997
Post War Immigration	1945–1955	Halifax, NS (plaque)	1988
Origins of Coal Industry in Alberta	1874 and after	Lethbridge, AB (plaque)	1926
Canadian Pacific Railway's Trans-Canada Limited (1919–1931)	1919–1931	Cranbrook, BC	2011
Indian Battle of 1870	1870	Lethbridge, AB	1966
Dalhousie Law School	1883	Halifax, NS	1982
Victorian Order of Nurses – VON	1897	Ottawa, ON	1997
David Thompson on the Columbia River	1807–1812	Castlegar, BC	1952
Canadian Sovereignty in the Arctic Archipelago	1880 onward	Melville Island, NT	1981
Battle of the Atlantic	1939–1945	Halifax, NS (plaque)	2000
Northwest Territories and Yukon Radio System	1923–early 1960s	Dawson, YT	1997
Ice Boat Service	1827–1917	Traverse, PE	1955
French Shore Treaty	1713–1904	Port au Choix, NL	1955
Port Arthur	1869, 1870, 1883, 1902	Thunder Bay, ON	1920
First Women's Institutes	1897	Stoney Creek, ON	1937
Construction of Dundas Street / Governor's Road	1793–1794	Dundas, ON	1927
Underground Railroad	early 19th century – 1865	Windsor, ON	1925
Liberation of the Netherlands	1944–1945	Wageningen or Nijmegen, Netherlands; Apeldoorn, Netherlands (plaque); Ottawa, ON (plaque)	2000
Noble and Wolf v. Alley	1950	London, ON	2009
Grain Growers' Grain Company	1905	Sintaluta, SK	1984
Winnipeg General Strike	1919	Winnipeg, MB	1974
First Aeroplane Flying in Canada	1909	Baddeck, NS	1934
Club de hockey Canadien	1909	Montreal, QC	2009
Montréal Dressmakers' Strike of 1937	1937	Montreal, QC	2007
Young Women's Christian Association (YWCA)	1870 onward	Saint John, NB	1998
Establishment of Ice Roads in the Northwest Territories	1945 onward	Fort Providence, NT	2000
Arrival of Jacques Cartier at Gaspé	1534	Gaspé, QC	1924
Canol Road	1941–1945	Johnsons Crossing, YT (plaque); Norman Wells, NT (plaque)	1983
Wabana Iron Ore Mines	1895–1966	Bell Island, NL; St. John's, NL (plaque)	1988
Preservation of the Plains Bison	1906 and after	Lamont, AB; Elk Island National Park, AB	1943
Construction of Hudson Bay Railway	1908–1917, 1925–1929	The Pas to Churchill, MB	1994
Shipbuilding in Prince Edward Island	1820–1880	Cardigan, PE	2009
Gouzenko Affair	1945–1946	Ottawa, ON	2002
Queenston-Chippawa Portage Road	1789–1829	Stamford, ON	1925
Forest Industry in British Columbia	19th–20th centuries	Port Alberni, BC	1943
Overlanders of 1862	1862	Jasper National Park, AB	1938
Development of Whitney Pier	1899–1930	Sydney, NS	2015
St. Laurent Class of Canadian Warship	1948–1949	Bridgewater, NS	1998
North American Boundary Commission of 1872–1876	1872–1876	Emerson, MB	1997
Fort Garry – Fort Edmonton Trail	1800s–1890	Batoche, SK; Winnipeg, MB; Edmonton, AB	1972
Detention of Second World War Military Prisoners of War and of Enemy Aliens Sent to Canada from Great Britain	1940–1947	national Marathon, ON (plaque)	2011
Cariboo Wagon Road	1862–1865 (built)	Yale, BC	1923
Quebec Ship Labourers' Benevolent Society	1862 (founded)	Quebec, QC	2005
Bush Pilots of Canada	1920s, 1930s	Yellowknife, NT	1960
First Ministry of Health	1918	Fredericton, NB	1938
First Railway in Western Canada	1877–1878	Dominion City, MB	1954
Shipbuilding at the Burrard Dry Dock Company	1900s	North Vancouver, BC	2004
Career of the Marco Polo (vessel)	1851–1883	Saint John, NB	1990
Early Land Survey in Ontario	1783–1784	Kingston, ON	1932
Upper Canadian Act of 1793 Against Slavery	1793	Niagara-on-the-Lake, ON	1992
Construction of the Lethbridge Viaduct	1907–1909	Lethbridge, AB	2005
Ten Acadian National Conventions (1881–1937)	1881–1937	Miscouche, PE	1997
Shore Crew of Newfoundland and Labrador	1900s	Newfoundland and Labrador	2011
Canada and the South African War	1899–1902 and after	national London, ON	2005
Fort Benton-Fort Macleod Trail	1800s until 1882	Coutts, AB (plaque)	1938
Completion of the Canadian Pacific Railway	1885, 1886	Port Moody, BC	1936
Construction of the St. Lawrence Seaway	1954–1959	Iroquois, ON (plaque)	2004
Wyandot (Hurons)	18th–19th centuries	Amherstburg, ON	1953
Alouette 1 Satellite Programme	1962–1972	Ottawa, ON	2007
Prince Edward Island becomes a Province of Canada	1873	Charlottetown, PE	1950
Capture of the Tigress and Scorpion	1814	off Drummond Island, Michigan, United States; Penetanguishene, ON (plaque)	1927
Women Workers in Canada's Military Munitions Industry	1882–1945	national Quebec, QC (plaque)	2008
Missaguash-Baie Verte Portage / Pre-contact Indian Portage	prehistoric	Baie Verte, NB	1936
Kaplan & Sprachman, Architects	early 20th century – 1950	national Toronto, ON (plaque)	2008
Pulp and Paper Industry in Quebec	1900s	Trois-Rivières, QC	2005
Formation and development of the Canadian Home and School Federation	1927	national Baddeck, NS (plaque)	2003
First International Polar Year 1882–1883	1882–1883	Fort Conger, Quttinirpaaq National Park, NU; Old Fort Rae, NT	1981
Removal of Ripple Rock	1958	Campbell River, BC	2008
Skirmish at McCrae's House	1813	Chatham, ON	1924
First Submarine Telegraph Cable	1852	Cape Traverse, PE (plaque) to Cape Tormentine, NB	1932
North Atlantic Treaty of 1949	1949	Ottawa, ON	1999
Postal Service in Nova Scotia	1754 onward	Halifax, NS	1924
Founding of the Canadian Jewish Congress	1919	Montreal, QC	2005
Establishment of Continuous Meteorological Record-keeping in Canada	1840 and after	Toronto, ON	1989
Stained Glass of Robert McCausland Limited	1856 onward	Toronto, ON	1991
Gaultier de La Vérendrye's Journey to the Mandans	1738	Darlingford, MB	1946
Secret Intelligence Activities at Camp X	1941–1969	Whitby, ON	2011
Fight at the Long-Sault	1660	Carillon, QC and Chute-à-Blondeau, ON	1954
Newfoundland's Entry into Confederation	1949	Saint John's, NL	1958
First Steamship on Lake Ontario	1816	Bath, ON	1923
Literary and Historical Society of Quebec	1824–1944	Quebec, QC	1984
Maple Products	1900s onward	McDonalds Corners, ON; Mont-Saint-Hilaire, QC	2007
First Meeting of the New Brunswick Legislature	1786	Saint John, NB	1929
Battle of Passchendaele	1917	Passchendaele, Belgium	2007
Founding of The Royal Canadian Legion	1925	Winnipeg, MB	2009
Seat of Territorial Government	1876–1878; 1878–1883; 1883–1905	Pelly, Battleford, and Regina, SK	1973
Alcock – Brown Transatlantic Flight	1919	Saint John's, NL	1950
Soulanges Canal	1892–1899 (built) until 1959	Pointe-des-Cascades, QC	1929
British Commonwealth Air Training Plan	1939	national Trenton, ON (plaque); Brandon, MB (plaque)	1983
Canada's Marine Biological Stations	1908	St. Andrews, NB; Nanaimo, BC	2011
First Steam Fog Horn	1854, 1859	Saint John, NB	1925
Battle of Odelltown	1838	Lacolle, QC	1924
Shipbuilding in Nova Scotia	18th–19th centuries	Nova Scotia; Yarmouth, NS (plaque)	1960
Newfoundland Outport Nursing and Industrial Association (NONIA)	1924 (founded)	Newfoundland and Labrador; Pool's Cove, NL (plaque)	1999
Huron Tract	1826–1860	Goderich, ON	1929
Founding of the Canadian Naval Service	1910	national Halifax, NS (plaque)	2010
Contributions of the Sœurs de Miséricorde	1848	Quebec, QC	2006
Fishing Industry on the East Coast	before 16th–19th centuries	Bonavista, NL	1975
Black Railway Porters and their Union Activity	1880s–mid-1900s	national Montreal, QC (plaque)	1994
Abolition Movement in British North America	1783–1860s	Ontario, Quebec, Maritimes; Chatham, ON (plaque)	2004
First Meeting of the Executive Council of Upper Canada	1792	Kingston, ON	1920
Establishment of the Commercial Bush-Flying Industry in Canada	1919	Shawinigan, QC	2005
Survey of the Gulf and River of St. Lawrence	1827–1856	Charlottetown, PE (plaque)	1935
Voluntary Aid Detachments	1914–1919; 1939–1945	national Ottawa, ON	2011
Migration of Doukhobors to British Columbia	1908–1913	Castlegar, BC	2008
First Printing Press in North America	1751	Halifax, NS	1923
Founding of the École des hautes études commerciales de Montréal	1907	Montreal, QC	2008
Canadian Military Presence in Newfoundland	1940 and after	Botwood, NL	2000
Sisters of Charity of Saint Vincent de Paul, Halifax	1849 onward	Halifax, NS	2008
Sternwheel Steamer Snagboats on British Columbia's Rivers		British Columbia; New Westminster, BC	2007
White Pass and Yukon Route Railway	1900	Whitehorse, YT	1986
Building of the Canso Causeway	1952–1955	Port Hastings, NS	2005
Ranching Industry	1880s–1906	Prairies; Longview, AB	1968
Coming of the Mohawks	1784	Deseronto, ON	1929
Service of the Royal Canadian Air Force (RCAF) during the Second World War	1939–1945	Europe, Africa, Asia; London, England, United Kingdom	2000
Maritime Archaic Cemeteries / Phillips Garden Dorset	5000 BC–1000 BC	Labrador to Maine; Port au Choix, NL	1982
Development of Cobalt-60 Beam Therapy Unit (Cobalt Bomb)	1951	London, ON; Saskatoon, SK	1996
Fishing Industry on the West Coast	1830s onward	Pacific coast Richmond, BC	1976
Role of the Canadian Merchant Navy during the Second World War	1939–1945	worldwide Halifax, NS	2001
First Responsible Government in the British Empire Overseas	1848	Halifax, NS	1947
Contributions of the Religieuses hospitalières de Saint-Joseph	1659 onward	Montreal, QC	2006
Capture of the Ohio and Somers	1814	Fort Erie, ON	1929
Passenger and Packet Freighters on the Upper Great Lakes	to the mid-1900s	Upper Great Lakes; Sault Ste. Marie, ON	2008
Indian Treaty N^{o} 6	1876	Fort Carlton, SK; Fort Pitt, SK	1927
Asahi Baseball Team	1914–1941	Vancouver, BC	2008
Abenaki Migrations to New France (1675–1748)	1675–1748	New England, Quebec; Wôlinak, QC; Odanak, QC	2007
Canadian Arctic Expedition, 1913–1918	1913–1918	High Arctic, Western Arctic coast Victoria Island, NT/NU; Esquimalt, BC	1925
Chinese Construction Workers on the Canadian Pacific Railway	1880s	British Columbia; Yale, BC	1977
Last Spanish Exploration	1792	Salish Sea, Vancouver Island; Vancouver, BC	1927
First Eastward Crossing of the Northwest Passage	1940–1942	Northwest Passage; Vancouver, BC to Sydney, NS; Regina, SK (plaque)	1943
Crossing of Lake Ontario by Marilyn Bell	1954	Lake Ontario; Toronto, ON (plaque)	2005
Black Pioneers in British Columbia	1858	Saanichton, BC	1997
Canadian Role in the Defence of Hong Kong	1941	Hong Kong, China; Ottawa, ON (plaque)	2000
Cape Breton – Newfoundland Cable	1856	Newfoundland to Cape Breton; North Sydney, NS	1927
Liverpool Privateers	American Revolution; French Revolution; War of 1812	Liverpool, NS	1933
Kaministikwia and Pigeon River Routes	before 1688, 1688 – after 1800	Kakabeka Falls, ON (plaque)	1925
Monseigneur Jean-Baptiste de La Croix de Chevrières de Saint-Vallier in Acadia	1686, 1689	Acadia; Grand Falls, NB	1990
Industry at Trail	1895 onward	Trail, BC	1954
Loyalists at Shelburne	1783	Shelburne, NS	1923
Norwegian Training in Canada during the Second World War	1940–1945	Gravenhurst, ON (plaque); Toronto, ON	2001
Beaver	1835–1888	Pacific coast Vancouver, BC; Langley, BC	1923
Explorations of Sir Alexander MacKenzie	1789 and 1793	Prince George, BC (plaque)	1923
Waterloo Pioneers	1800–1805 and after	Kitchener, ON	1924
Ayling and Reid Flight	1934	Wasaga Beach, ON	1949
Establishment of the Beaver Lake / Mundare Ukrainian Catholic Mission	1902	Mundare, AB	2007
N^{o} 2 Construction Battalion, C. E. F.	1916–1920	Pictou, NS	1992
Alaska Highway	1941–1943	Contact Creek, BC; Soldiers Summit, YT	1954
Establishment and Role of the St. Lawrence River Pilots	mid-1600s onward	Pointe-au-Père, QC	2000
Indian Treaty N^{o} 1	1871	Selkirk, MB	1927
Arrival of the Selkirk Settlers	1812	Winnipeg, MB	1924
Contributions of the Augustines de la Miséricorde de Jésus of Québec City's Hôtel-Dieu	1639–1960s	Quebec, QC	2006
Contribution of German Troops to the Defence of Canada during the American War of Independence (1776–1783)	1776–1783	Quebec, QC	2007
Chartering of Local 120 of the United Garment Workers of America at the Great Western Garment Company	1911	Edmonton, AB	2007
Fort William	late 17th century, 1804–1821; 1875, 1883, 1905	Thunder Bay, ON	1923
Capture of Detroit	1812	Port Dover, ON; Windsor, ON	1923
Meetings of Parliament, 1841–1866	1841–1866	Kingston, ON; Montreal, QC; Toronto, ON; Quebec, QC	1949
Entry of Women in the Military in World War II	1941–1946	Esquimalt, BC; Calgary, AB; Halifax, NS	1994
Establishment of the Experimental Farm Branch	1886	Ottawa, ON; Nappan, NS; Brandon, MB; Agassiz, BC; Indian Head, SK	1981
Mining	1880s onward	Sudbury, ON; Cobalt, ON; Noranda, QC; Asbestos, QC; South Porcupine, ON; Labrador City, NL; Port Radium, NT	1973
Nine Mile Portage and Willow Depot	1814	Barrie to Minesing, ON	2014
18th Century Mi'kmaw-French Alliance	1720–1758	Port-la-Joye, PE and Port-Toulouse (St. Peters), NS	2016
Black Militia Units in Upper Canada 1812–1850	1812–1815, 1837–1850	Queenston Heights, Fort George, Fort Mississauga, ON, et al.	2016
Charlottetown and Québec Conferences of 1864	1864	Charlottetown, PE and Quebec, QC	2016
Continental Air Defence in the Cold War	1945–1991	national, including Toronto and North Bay, ON	2016
Grain Transshipment at the Lakehead	1883–1929 (peak period)	Thunder Bay, ON	2016
Hundred Days Offensive	August 8–November 11, 1918	Amiens, The Scarpe, Drocourt-Quéant Line, Canal du Nord, Valenciennes, France, and Mons, Belgium. Plaque located at Cambrai, France.	2016
Military Nurses of Canada	since 1885	nationwide, worldwide	2016
Preston Rivulettes Women's Hockey Team	1931–1940	Preston, ON	2016
Ski Jumping at Mount Revelstoke	1915–1975	Mount Revelstoke National Park, BC	2016
The Annual Innu Missions at Musquaro (1800–1946), Quebec	1800–1946	Musquaro, QC	2016
The Arrival of Displaced Persons in Canada, 1945–1951	1945–1951	nationwide	2016
The Canadian War Memorials Fund	1916–1918	First World War battlefields	2016
The Construction of the Trans-Canada Highway	1949–1970	nationwide	2016
The Founding of the Saint John Labourers' Benevolent Association	1849 (founded)	Saint John, NB	2016
The Nova Scotia Coal Strikes of 1922–1925	1922–1925	Cape Breton Island, NS	2016
The Second Battle of Ypres	April 22–25, 1915	Ypres, Belgium	2016
Tugboating along the West Coast	1860s–present	British Columbia Coast	2016
Assiniboine Park and Zoo	since 1904	Winnipeg, MB	2016
Jacques & Hay Furniture Manufacturers	1835–1885	Toronto, ON, and beyond	2016
The Halifax Explosion	1917	Halifax, NS	2016
Komagata Maru Incident	1914	Vancouver, BC	2016
Stanley Cup	1892	Ottawa, ON, and nationwide	2017
National Hockey League	1917	Montreal, QC, across Canada and the USA	2017
The Red River Expedition of 1870	1870	From Toronto, ON, to Fort Garry, MB, via land and the Great Lakes	2018
Vice-Admiralty Court of Halifax	1749 (founded)	Halifax, NS	2018
Discovery of Insulin	1921–22	Toronto, ON	2018
The Dionne Quintuplets	1934	Callander, ON	2018
Toronto Maple Leafs Hockey Club	1917 (Arenas); 1927 (Maple Leafs)	Toronto, ON	2018
The Universal Negro Improvement Association in Canada	1919	Montreal, Toronto, and nationwide	2018
Expo 67	1967	Montreal, QC	2018
The Spanish Flu in Canada (1918–1920)	1918–1920	Quebec City, Montreal, Halifax, and nationwide	2018
Early Science in Canada and the Hudson's Bay Company (1768–c. 1810)	1768–1810	Prince of Wales Fort, MB, and several other northern posts	2018
Stratford Festival	1953	Stratford, ON	2018
Construction of the Prince Edward Island Railway	1871	Prince Edward Island	2018
Ducks Unlimited Canada	1938–present	Winnipeg, MB, and nationwide	2019
Winnipeg Falcons Hockey Club	1909–1920	Winnipeg, MB	2019
German U-Boat Attacks at Bell Island	1942	Bell Island, NL	2019
Meshikamau-shipu Travel Route	1500 BCE	A 330 km route between Sheshatshiu and Michikamau Lake, NL	2019
Early Commercial Radio Broadcasting	1918–1932	Montreal, QC, and nationwide	2019
Enslavement of African People in Canada	c. 1629–1834	QC, ON, NS, NB, PE	2020
West Indian Domestic Scheme	1955–1967	Toronto, Montreal, and nationwide	2020
Residential school system	1880s to 1990s	nationwide	2020
Examination Unit (XU)	1941–1945	Ottawa	2021
Sable Island Humane Establishment	1801 to 1958	Sable Island, NS	2021
Tackaberry Skates	1896 to 1981	Brandon, MB	2022
Breaking Racial Barriers in the NHL	1918 to 1958	Toronto, Boston, Chicago, New York	2022
Jamaican Maroons in Nova Scotia	1796 to 1800	Halifax, Preston, Boydville, NS	2022
Exclusion of Chinese Immigrants	1923 to 1947	Vancouver and nationwide	2023
Black Migrations to Sierra Leone	1792 and 1800	Nova Scotia and New Brunswick	2023
Celebrations of Emancipation Day	1834 to present	Ontario, Quebec, Nova Scotia, New Brunswick	2023
Klippert Case	1967	Northwest Territories	2025
Invention of the Morris Rod-Weeder	1929	Bangor, Saskatchewan	2025
RCMP Musical Ride	1887-present	nationwide	2025
Rural Electrification Across Canada	1912–1970	nationwide	2025
Miramichi Fire of 1825	1825	New Brunswick	2025
First World War Training at Sarcee Camp	1825	Tsuu T'ina 145, Alberta	2025

== See also ==
- National Historic Sites
- National Historic Persons
- Heritage Minutes
- List of years in Canada
