= John Jacques =

John Jacques may refer to:

- John Jacques, Baron Jacques (1905–1995), British businessman and politician
- Sir John Jacques, 1st Baronet (died 1650), English politician
- John Jacques (furniture manufacturer) (1804–1886), Canadian cabinet-maker, furniture manufacturer and financier
