= Clearview Public Library =

Public library in Ontario, Canada

- 44°25′11″N 80°05′17″W
- Location: Clearview, Simcoe County, Ontario, Canada
- Type: Public library
- Established: 1921
- Branches: 3 (Creemore, New Lowell, Stayner)

Other information
- Website: www.clearview.library.on.ca

Clearview Public Library is a public library serving the residents of the Township of Clearview, Simcoe County, Ontario, Canada, and through contracts to the residents of the adjoining townships of Adjala–Tosorontio, Simcoe County, and Mulmur, Dufferin County. Library branches are located in the communities of Stayner, Creemore and New Lowell. A drop box is located in the community of Nottawa.

== History ==
Before the formation of Clearview Township, local Women's Institutes played a significant role in establishing local libraries. The Stayner chapter of the Women's Institute owned the Stayner Branch library building at 201 Huron Street until just after World War II. After the war, this building was remodeled and the Women's Institute waived the final $900 payment on the Stayner Branch, returning the money to the Library Board for the purchase of new books.

In 1921, the first public library in Creemore was located on the top floor of the Corbett Drug Store. Miss Flossie Weir was appointed as the first librarian. In the next 15 years, the library moved to the upstairs of the Matchett House, and then the Village Council struck a deal with the municipality to move the library to the "old bank building" as a Canadian Centennial project in 1966. In 1989, plans to enlarge the library's space began as part of the Centennial celebrations. By 1992, the ground was broken, and the new building erected at 165 Library Street that same year. A Friends of the Library continues to offer support to the Creemore Branch.

For many years the Sunnidale branch was located in the New Lowell Community Hall, and then relocated to a small portable. After a dedicated community fundraising effort, the Sunnidale Branch was again relocated into a reclaimed historical schoolhouse in New Lowell. The 137-year-old schoolhouse on County Road 9 was extensively renovated, and opened its doors as a library in March, 2008.

== Services ==
All locations offer programs for children, summer reading program, teen programs, and the opportunity to join the bookclub at the Stayner branch. Collection materials include print books, books on CD, Playaways, DVDs, music CDs and talking books provided by the CNIB. Library card holders may also download free audiobooks and ebooks through the library's website, and consult staff for reference assistance through the Ask Ontario service. Career access computers, in-house public computers, and wireless internet service are available at each branch. Interlibrary Loan service is facilitated through association with the Southern Ontario Library Service (SOLS).

The Stayner Branch of Clearview Public Library acts as the administrative/management centre and is the repository for its resource collection and both provincial and federal government documents.

Branches of the library
| Branch | Address |
|---|---|
| Creemore | 165 Library Street, Creemore, Ontario |
| Stayner | 269 Regina Street, Stayner, Ontario |
| Sunnidale | 5237 County Road 9, New Lowell, Ontario |

== Mission statement ==
Clearview Public Library exists to respond to the educational, informational and cultural needs of the residents in the communities that make up the Township of Clearview.
