= Henry's House, Alberta =

Former Jasper-area fur trading post

Henry House
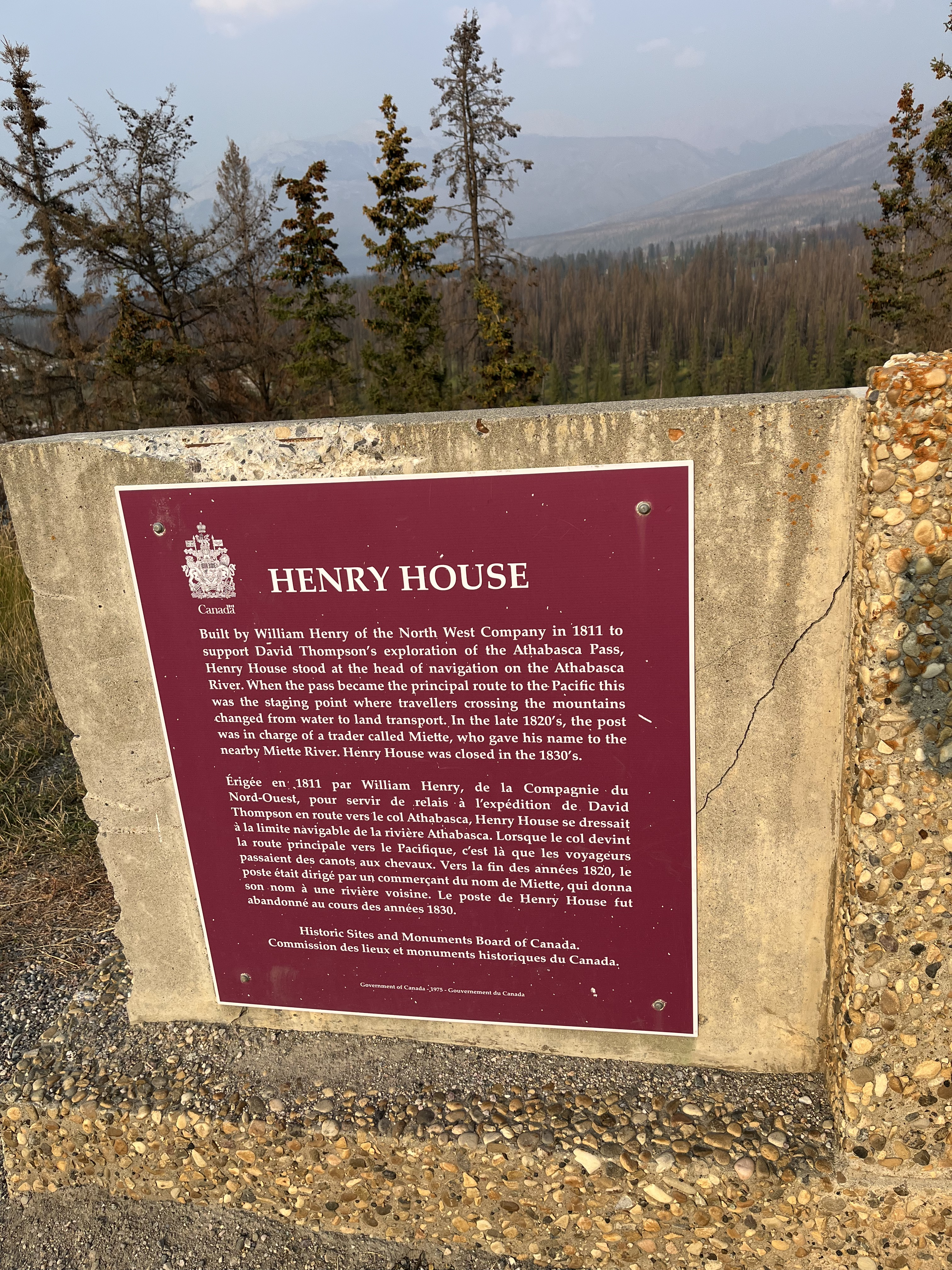
- Monument at a pullout off Highway 16 near Jasper, Alberta

- Location within Canada Location within Alberta
- 52.87649°N 118.0722°W
- Location: Jasper National Park, Alberta, Canada

History
- Built: 1811
- Built for: North West Company

Site notes
- Governing body: Parks Canada

National Historic Site of Canada
- Type: Event
- Designated: May 22, 1926

Henry's House or William Henry's Old House was a minor fur trading post presumed to be near present-day Old Fort Point, across the Athabasca River from the town of Jasper in Jasper National Park. Its establishment in 1811 was designated a National Historic Event in 1926 and commemorated with a plaque.

David Thompson's North West Company brigade arrived in the upper Athabasca in December 1810. After preparing for the trip over Athabasca Pass to reach the Columbia River, William Henry remained behind in January 1811 to keep supplies and horses for their return. Thompson's journal refers to a hut, meat shed, and an encampment for the horses. Thompson's party returned in May 1812 and wrote that everything was in order. The site seems to have been unsuitable because in 1813, François Decoigne established a new post, which would come to be known as Jasper House, downriver near Brûlé Lake.

Contrary to the 1926 plaque which claims this was an important trading post for 20 years, it only served as a hastily constructed supply depot and was probably abandoned a little over a year after it was built. In 1813, Henry was in present-day Oregon, and by 1814 Gabriel Franchère reported the post as being long abandoned.
