= Clearview, Ontario =

Clearview
- Township (lower-tier)
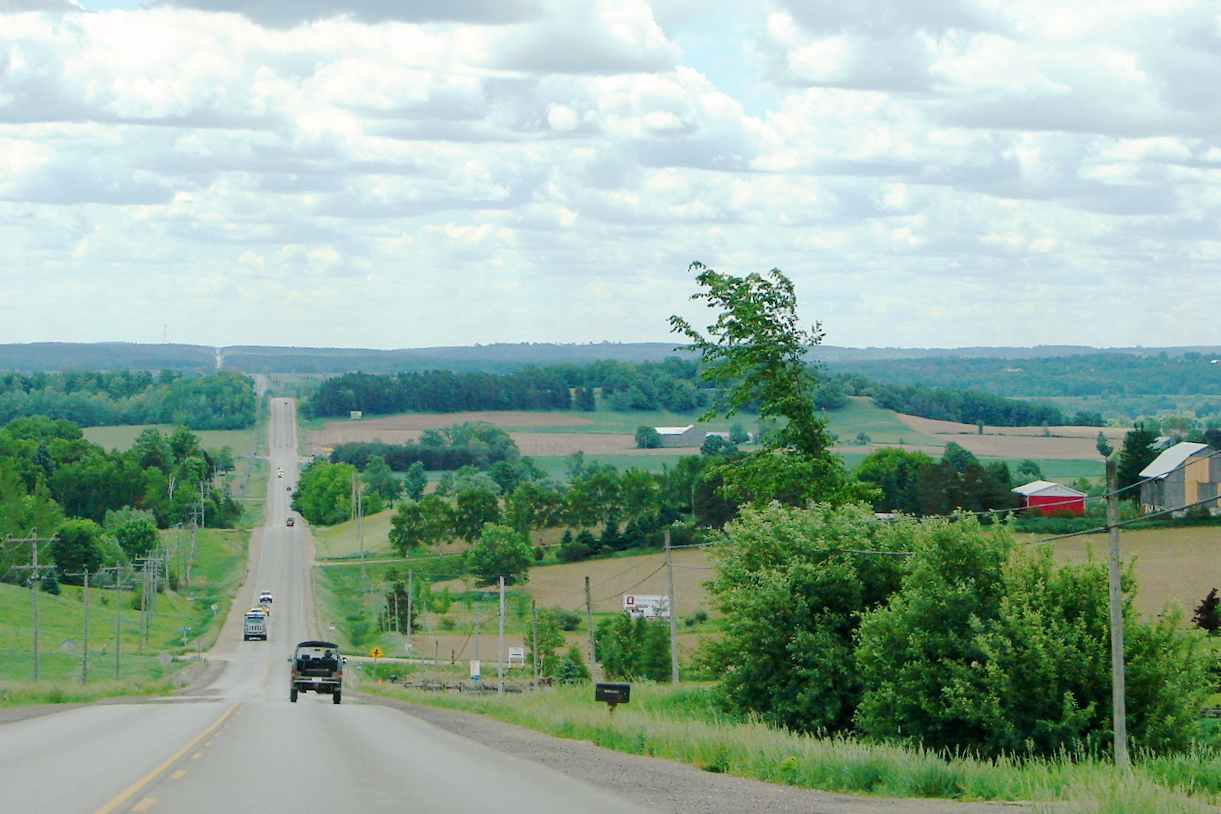
- Motto: Beautiful Landscapes, Friendly People
- Location within Simcoe County Location within Southern Ontario
- Coordinates: 44°23′53″N 80°04′27″W
- Country: Canada
- Province: Ontario
- County: Simcoe
- Established: January 1, 1994

Government
  - Mayor: Doug Measures
  - MPs: Terry Dowdall (C)
  - MPPs: Brian Saunderson (PC)

Area
  - Land: 556.37 km^{2} (214.82 sq mi)
- Elevation: 221 m (725 ft)

Population (2021)
  - Total: 14,814
  - Density: 26.6/km^{2} (69/sq mi)
- Time zone: UTC-5 (Eastern Time Zone (EST))
  - Summer (DST): UTC-4 (Eastern Time Zone (EDT))
- Postal code FSA: L0M
- Area codes: 705, 249
- Website: www.clearview.ca

Clearview is a rural incorporated township in Simcoe County in Central Ontario, Canada, west of Barrie and south of Collingwood and Wasaga Beach.

== History ==
Human occupation of the area is evident starting in as early as the Paleo-Indian period.

Before the arrival of European settlers, the area of Clearview Township was part of the territory of the Petun, a confederation of Iroquoians who were closely related to the Wendat (Huron) and Neutral peoples. The Petun were ravaged by disease epidemics in the early 17th century and victim to raids by the Haudenosaunee Confederacy (a part of the Beaver Wars), with much of their remaining population fleeing as refugees and vacating the territory. There are abundant archaeological remains in the township from the Petun period.

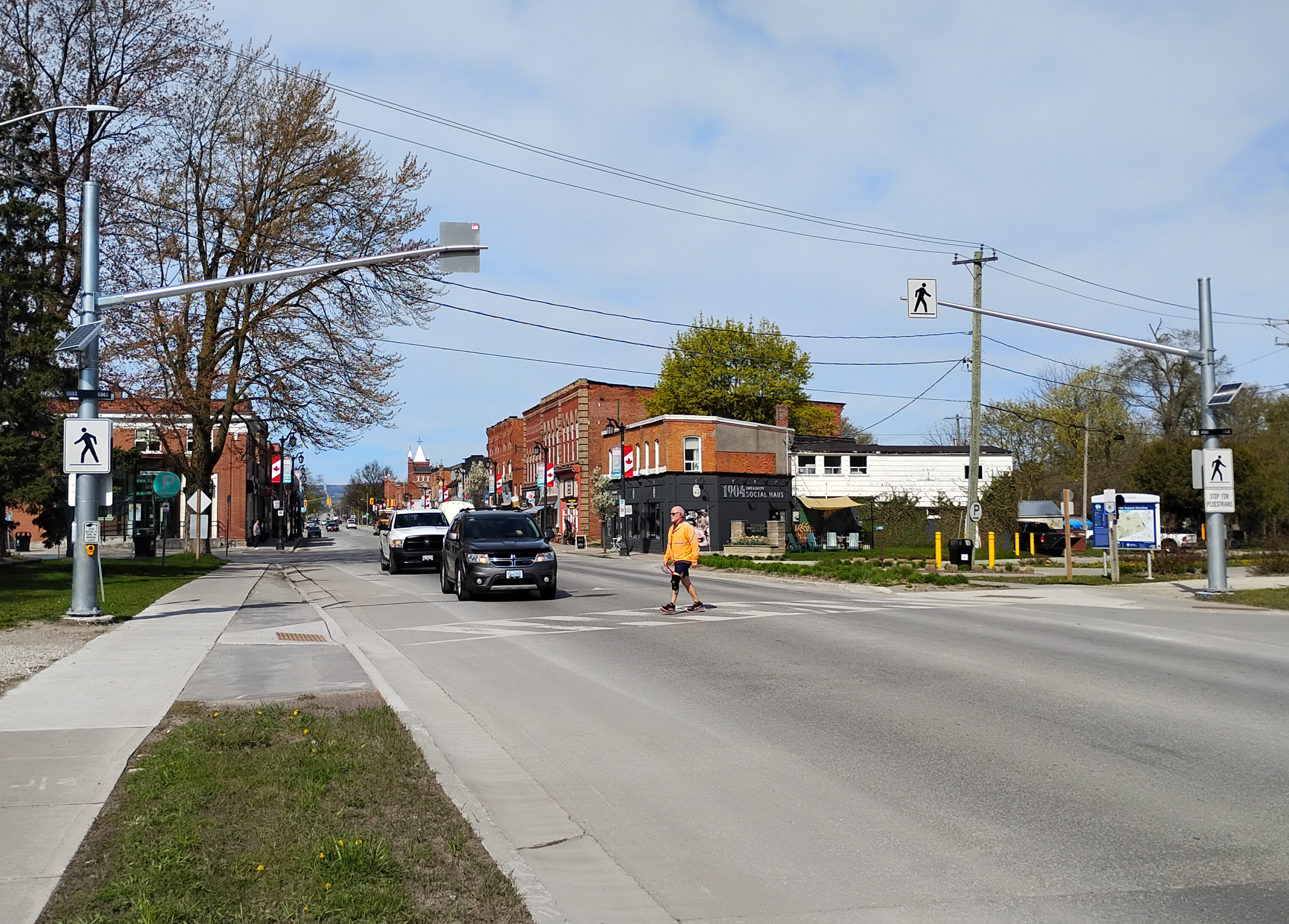
Stayner

Early settlement on the site of Stayner coincided with the construction of the Toronto, Simcoe and Huron Railway between 1851 and 1855. The community of Stayner, which was originally called Nottawasaga Station, developed into a significant agricultural and lumbering centre. Stayner was incorporated as a village in 1872, and as a Town in 1888. The Village of Creemore was incorporated effective 20 November 1889.

Before incorporation, New Lowell was the site of a timber plant owned by Jacques and Hay.

Clearview Township was established on January 1, 1994, when the Town of Stayner, the Village of Creemore and the Townships of Nottawasaga and Sunnidale were amalgamated. The Townships of Nottawasaga and Sunnidale had been incorporated in 1851 and 1858, respectively.

== Geography ==
The township comprises the communities of Avening, Batteaux, Brentwood, Cashtown Corners, Creemore, Dunedin, Duntroon, Glen Huron, Maple Valley, New Lowell, Nottawa, Pretty River Valley, Singhampton, Smithdale, Stayner, Sunnidale, Sunnidale Corners and Websterville.

It borders on the following municipalities:

- North Collingwood, Wasaga Beach
- East Springwater, Essa
- South Adjala-Tosorontio, Mulmur, Melancthon
- West Grey Highlands, The Blue Mountains

Clearview (and Simcoe County in general) is part of Central Ontario as well as the Georgian Triangle. The climate in the area is classified as Humid Continental (Warm Summer Subtype).

Located in the Great Lakes lowlands, it has fertile soil quite suitable for farming. As a result of the proximity to the Great Lakes it suffers from Lake Effect.

== Demographics ==
In the 2021 Census of Population conducted by Statistics Canada, Clearview had a population of 14,814 living in 5,570 of its 6,296 total private dwellings, a change of 4.7% from its 2016 population of 14,151. With a land area of 556.37 km^{2} (214.82 sq mi), it had a population density of 26.6/km^{2} (69.0/sq mi) in 2021.

Canada census – Clearview community profile

	2021	2016	2011
Population	14,814 (+4.7% from 2016)	14,151 (+3.0% from 2011)	13,734 (-2.5% from 2006)
Land area	556.37 km^{2} (214.82 sq mi)	557.10 km^{2} (215.10 sq mi)	557.44 km^{2} (215.23 sq mi)
Population density	26.6/km^{2} (69/sq mi)	25.4/km^{2} (66/sq mi)	24.6/km^{2} (64/sq mi)
Median age	44.8 (M: 43.6, F: 45.6)	45.3 (M: 44.4, F: 46.0)
Private dwellings	6,296 (total) 5,570 (occupied)	6,040 (total)	5,852 (total)
Median household income	$97,000	$78,519

References: 2021 2016 2011

Historical census populations – Clearview, Ontario
Year	Pop.	±%
1996	12,407	—
2001	13,796	+11.2%
2006	14,088	+2.1%
2011	13,734	−2.5%
2016	14,151	+3.0%
2021	14,814	+4.7%
Source: Statistics Canada

== Economy ==
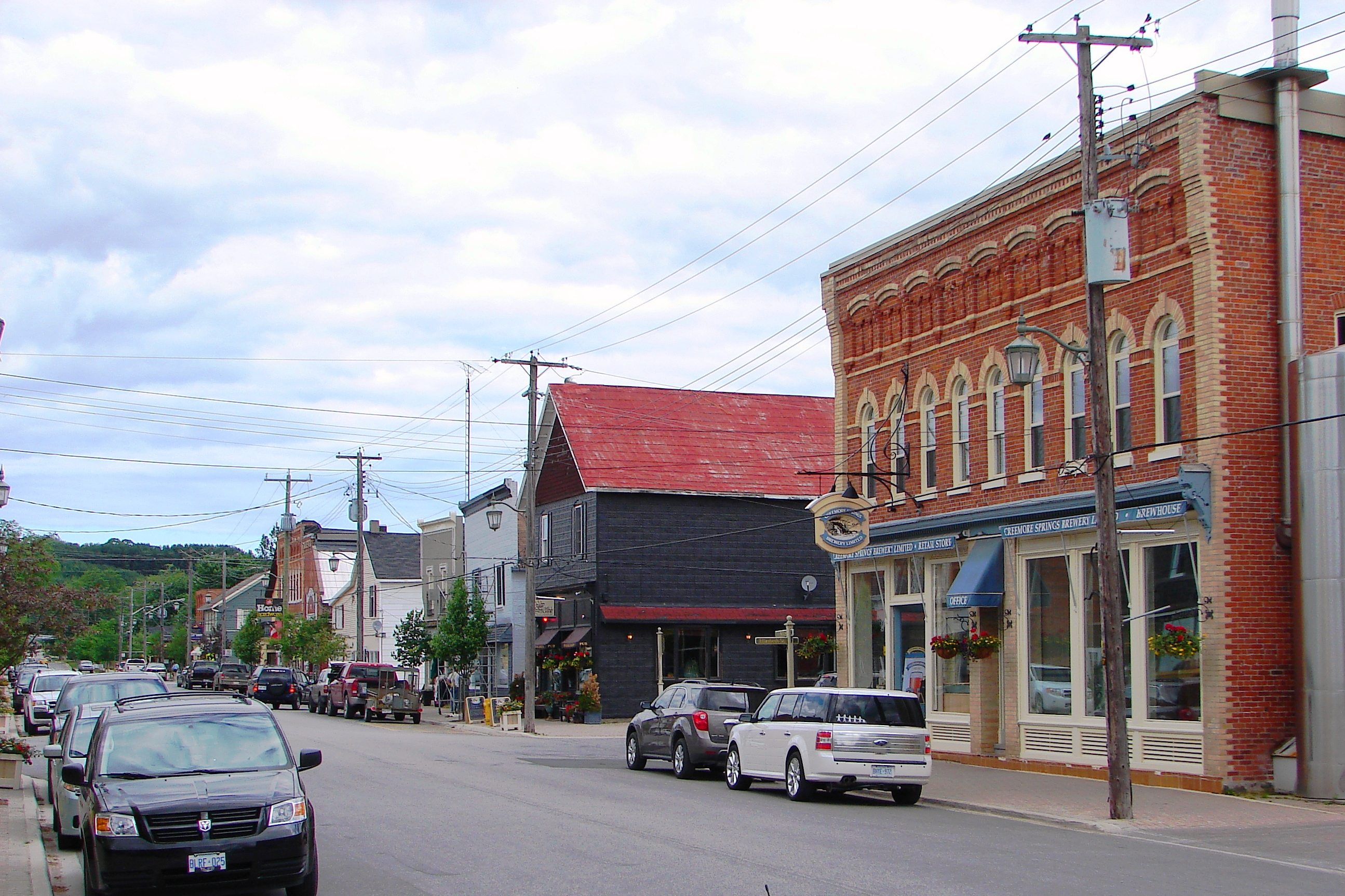
Creemore

As of 2006, compared to Ontario as a whole, construction, agriculture, and manufacturing industries employ a greater than average percentage of the workforce (business, finance and real estate employ smaller than average). The employment rate was 67.1% (62.8% for Ontario) and the unemployment rate was 4.5% (6.4% for Ontario). 40% of the workforce worked outside the municipality and 13% worked from home.

The well-known Creemore Springs Brewery is located in Creemore.

Health Canada medical marijuana licensed producers The Peace Naturals Project and Agripharm Corp. produces their medicinal Cannabis in Clearview Township.

The Stayner Sun is the township's newspaper of record. It has published continually since 1877. The newspaper is owned by Metroland Media Group.

== Government ==
The township is administered by a Town Council with one member from each of the seven (numbered) wards, a mayor and deputy-mayor.

The administration of the town is divided into the Departments of Finance, Planning and Development, Public Works, an Administration staff as well as the Public Library and Fire Department. All the main administrative buildings of Clearview are located in Stayner.

The 2019 approved budget for the township was $28.98 million.

== Attractions ==
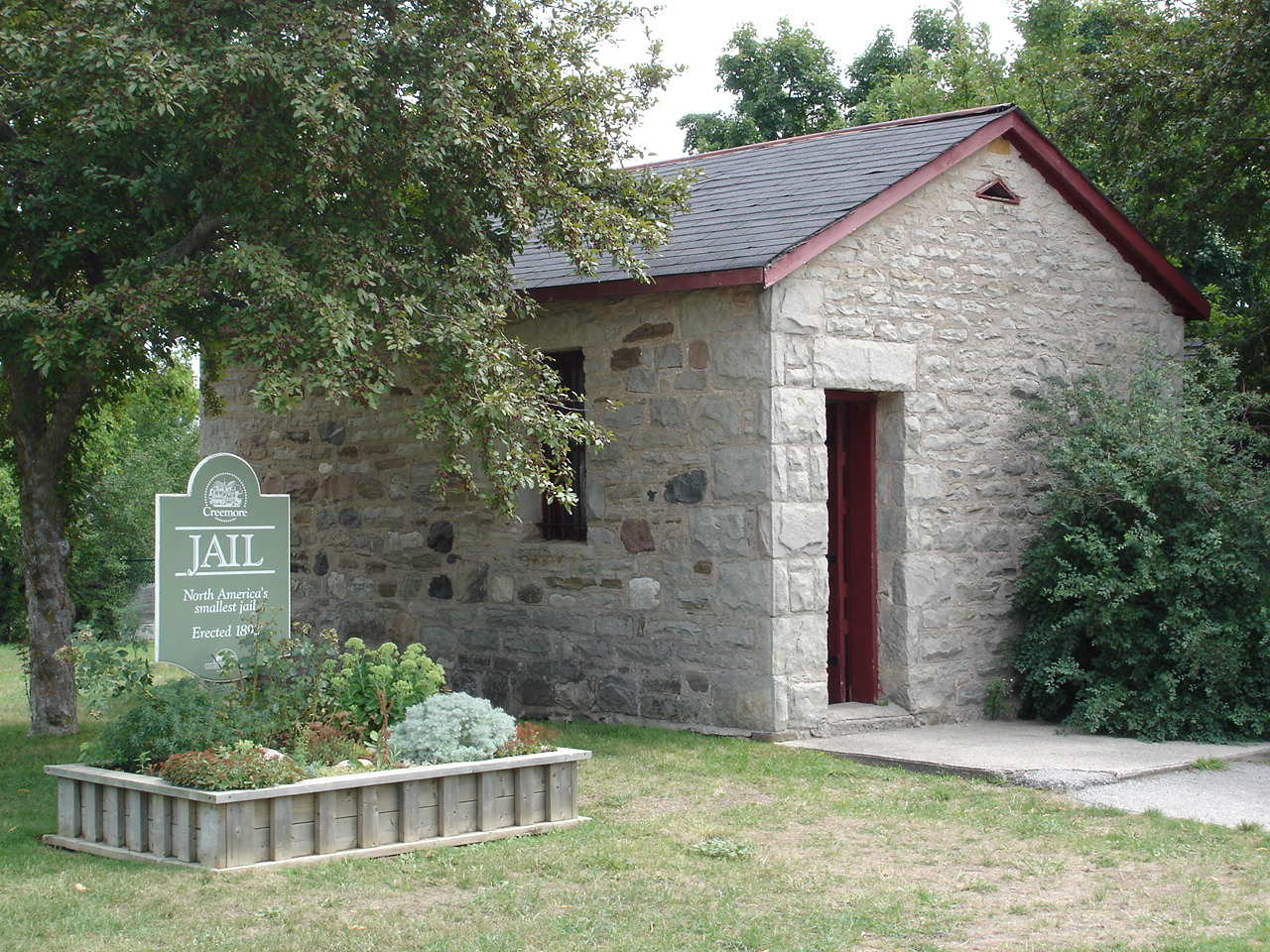
Creemore Jail

Creemore was one of the original claimants for the location of Ontario's smallest jailhouse. Its jailhouse, with dimensions at 4.5 metres by 6 metres, make it smaller than the other early claimants, Tweed, and Coboconk; however, others in Rodney, Port Dalhousie, Providence Bay, and Berens River are smaller. Today, the jail has been converted into a museum.

There are two arenas (Stayner, Creemore), three Baseball Parks (Nottawa, Stayner, with the largest being in New Lowell) and 3 Golf Courses (Duntroon Highlands, Batteaux Creek Golf Club, Mad River Golf and Country Club) in Clearview. The Bruce Trail runs along the Niagara Escarpment in the western part of the township, and there is a cross-country skiing centre in Duntroon. Devil's Glen Provincial Park, Nottawasaga Lookout and Noisy River Provincial Nature Reserves, and Nottawasaga Bluffs, New Lowell, and Carruthers Memorial Conservation Areas as well as the Mel McKean Memorial Park, Gowan Memorial Park, Ives Park, Kinsmen Participark, and Legion Park are all green spaces located within the township. The Stayner hay monster is located at Fernwood Farm & Market. It is a monster made of hay.

The Great Northern Exhibition is held annually in Clearview Township.

== Infrastructure ==
=== Transportation ===
Major roads in Clearview include Highway 26, County Road 124, (formerly Highway 24, and a part of Hurontario Street), County Road 42 (formerly a part of Airport Road), as well as other county roads such as 7, 9, 10, and 91. Despite its name, Collingwood Airport is also located in Clearview.

Clearview Public Transit is a small system that runs in the Clearview Township operating one route that connects in Wasaga Beach. The system started November 21, 2016, and is operated by Sinton-Landmark.

The Simcoe County LINX inter-community bus service's 2 Wasaga Beach to Barrie route has stops in Clearview at the Brentwood Community Centre in Brentwood and the Clearview Administration Centre in Stayner.

=== Services ===
Clearview is served by Collingwood General And Marine Hospital in Collingwood. Policing services are provided by the Huronia West detachment of the OPP out of Wasaga Beach. Fire protection is provided by volunteer fire stations located throughout the township.

== Education ==
Clearview township is served by the Simcoe County District School Board (SCDSB), Simcoe Muskoka Catholic District School Board (SMCDSB) and the French Catholic School Board Conseil scolaire catholique MonAvenir. A number of schools, although located in other municipalities (specifically Collingwood, Essa Township and Wasaga Beach), have catchment areas that extend into Clearview.

Name	Type	Location	Board	Municipality
Clearview Meadows Elementary School	Primary	Stayner	SCDSB	Clearview
Duntroon Central Public School	Primary	Duntroon	SCDSB	Clearview
New Lowell Central Public School	Primary	New Lowell	SCDSB	Clearview
Our Lady of Grace School	Primary	Angus	SMCDSB	Essa
Nottawa Elementary School	Primary	Nottawa	SCDSB	Clearview
Nottawasaga & Creemore Public School	Primary	Creemore	SCDSB	Clearview
Nottawasaga Pines Secondary School	Secondary	Angus	SCDSB	Essa
St. Mary's School	Primary	Collingwood	SMCDSB	Collingwood
St. Noel Chabanel	Primary	Wasaga Beach	SMCDSB	Wasaga Beach
Stayner Collegiate Institute	Secondary	Stayner	SCDSB	Clearview
Collingwood Collegiate Institute	Secondary	Collingwood	SCDSB	Collingwood
Our Lady of the Bay Catholic High School (previously Jean Vanier)	Secondary	Collingwood	SMCDSB	Collingwood

While there is no post-secondary education in Clearview itself, the main campus of Georgian College is in nearby Barrie with a satellite campus in Collingwood nearby.

The Clearview Public Library maintains branches in Stayner, Creemore and New Lowell.

== Notable people ==
- Tony Burgess (born 1959), Canadian novelist and screenwriter
- Francis Edward Crawford (1870-1947), fourth mayor of Sault Ste. Marie, Ontario
- Dorothy Macham (1910-2002), nursing superintendent
- Ron Oliver (born 1960), film director and writer
- Newt Randall (1880–1955), professional baseball player from New Lowell, Ontario

== See also ==
- List of townships in Ontario
