= Jacques & Hay =

Canadian furniture manufacturer

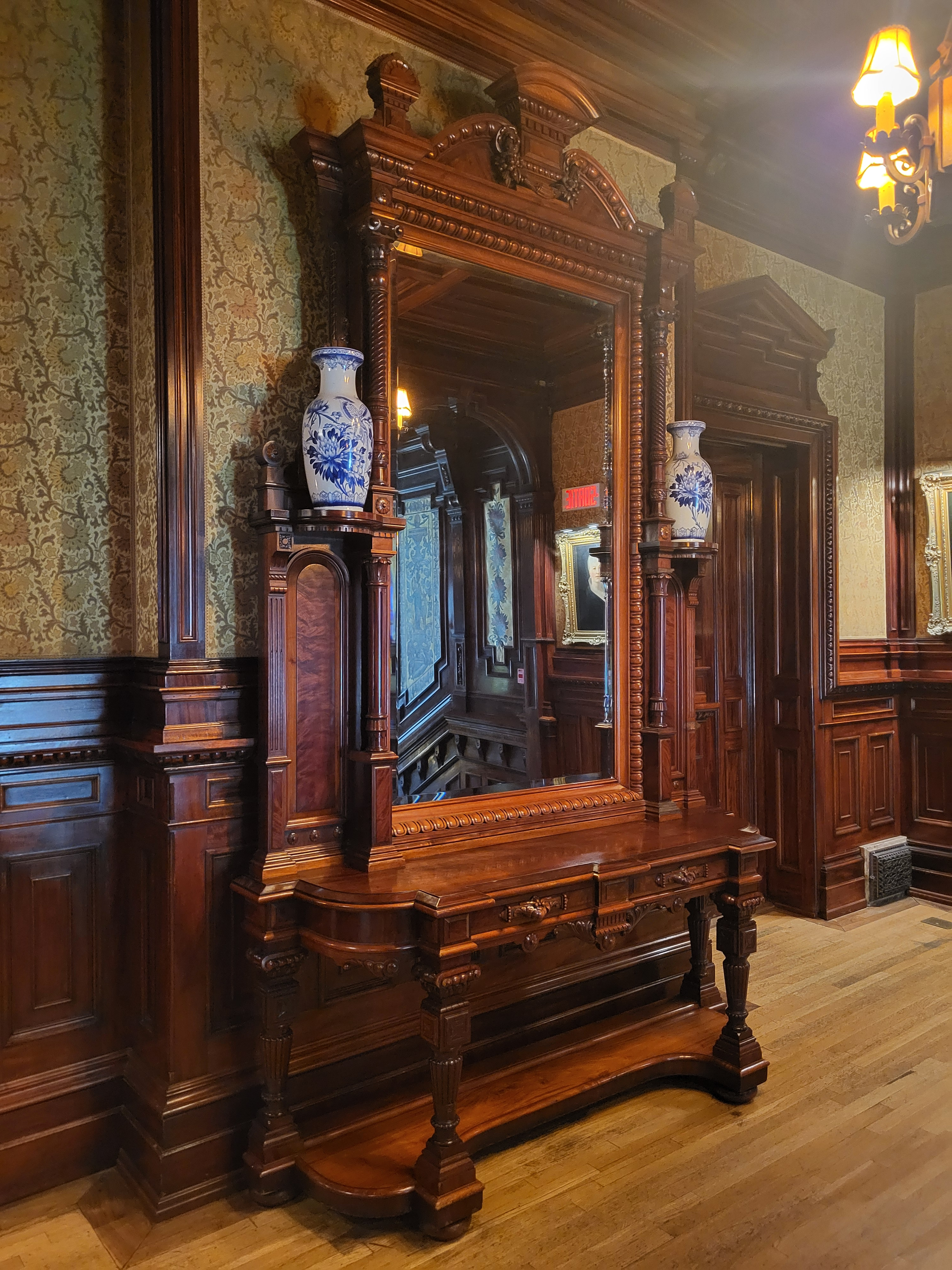
- Console Table by Jacques & Hay
- Industry: Furniture manufacturing
- Founded: 1835
- Founder: John Jacques and Robert Hay
- Defunct: 1922
- Headquarters: Canada
- Products: Furniture

Jacques & Hay was a 19th-century furniture manufacturer in Toronto, Canada, in 1872 to be renamed Robert Hay and Company and later still to become Charles Rogers and Sons Company. The company was colloquially known as "jakesenhay".

== History ==
Co-founded in 1835 by John Jacques (then a journeyman cabinetmaker from England) and Robert Hay (a journeyman cabinetmaker from Scotland). Originally the company started as just one small shop in Toronto, which Jacques and Hay had bought from Jacques' then boss, William Maxwell; but it expanded over the next several decades, in keeping with a regional boom in furniture manufacturing in the middle of the 19th century.

The company had a large plant in Toronto by the 1850s, which had an annual production of (among other things) 1,000 beds and 15,000 Windsor chairs, which were sold by outlets in several towns in the province of Ontario that the firm opened that decade. At the same time, the company had expanded its supply of raw materials with a timber plant at New Lowell (now part of the town of Clearview) and had industrialized its manufacturing at the Toronto factory to include multiple steam powered machines, including a jig saw, a belt sander, power planers, a multiple-drilling machine, a molding machine, and twenty circular saws. It was the largest factory of its kind in British America in 1864.

The company was employing marketing tactics such as manufacturing bespoke furniture for Albert Edward, the then Prince of Wales, and his retinue on his 1860 royal tour of several cities in the province. These marketing stunts proved to be ineffectual in the long term, however. The company lacked product catalogues and faced competition from other firms with lower production costs, such as not needing to ship lumber by rail from New Lowell to Toronto. And, after the initial burst of mechanization in the 1850s, the company failed to keep up with further advances in machinery from the 1860s onwards.

Jacques and Hay changed to Robert Hay and Company in 1872 when Jacques retired. Charles Rogers and George Craig became partners with Hay. Rogers, born in Glasgow in 1816, had immigrated to Canada in 1851, and joined the company as a carver. Craig, also born in Glasgow, in 1819, had earlier immigrated to Canada in 1842 and joined the company as a machinist.

Eventually, as Charles Rogers and Sons Company, the company dissolved in 1922.
