= Dorothy Macham =

Major (Principal Matron) Dorothy Ann Macham ARRC
- Born: July 19, 1910; New Lowell, Simcoe County, Ontario, Canada
- Died: July 12, 2002 (aged 91)
- Education: Women’s College Hospital School of Nursing (1932)
- Occupations: Nurse, Nursing Sister, Hospital Superintendent, Executive Director
- Years active: 1932-1979
- Employer(s): Women’s College Hospital, Royal Canadian Army Medical Corps, West Park Hospital

Dorothy Ann Macham ARRC (July 19, 1910 – July 12, 2002) was a Canadian Nursing Sister, hospital superintendent and later Executive Director of Toronto’s Women's College Hospital.

Macham joined the Royal Canadian Army Medical Corps in 1939 as a Nursing Sister. She served in mobile units and military hospitals in the United Kingdom and Europe, both as a nursing sister and a supervisor.

Macham received the Royal Red Cross Class 2 (ARRC) medal by King George VI in recognition of her wartime service. She also received an appointment to the Order of Canada on April 8, 1981.

== Early life ==
Dorothy Macham was born on July 19, 1910, in New Lowell in Simcoe County, Ontario.

Macham enrolled in the Women’s College Hospital School of Nursing in 1929 and completed the program in 1932. After graduation, she pursued postgraduate coursework in psychiatric nursing and nursing administration at the Whitby Mental Hospital from 1933 to 1935.

Macham returned to Women’s College Hospital in 1936, where she worked as an operating room supervisor until the start of World War II.

== Wartime service ==
On September 10, 1939, one day after Canada entered the war, Macham enlisted in the Royal Canadian Army Medical Corps as a Nursing Sister.

When Macham first enlisted in 1939, she held the rank of Lieutenant (Nursing Sister). She worked at the No. 15 Canadian General Hospital (CGH), which originated in the Toronto Military Hospital. In June 1940, she was transferred to the United Kingdom in one of the earliest groups of Canadian Nursing Sisters, travelling by ships in convoys alongside the soldiers.

In the United Kingdom, Macham served in the operating room at the No. 15 CGH in Bramshott Chase. In 1941, she was transferred to an innovative plastic surgery unit in Basingstoke, England, and was promoted to Nursing Sister-in-Charge. Macham later credited her experience in the operating room at Women’s College Hospital as a key factor in her recruitment to this role. In the summer of 1943, she was transferred to the No. 5 Casualty Clearing Station,. travelled over England and Italy. Macham was promoted to Captain (Matron).

In the summer of 1944, Macham moved to the No. 8 CGH, which was stationed in England, the Netherlands, France and Belgium. Later in 1944 she was stationed at hospitals in Holland and Antwerp. In December 1944, Macham was promoted to Major (Principal Matron). While in Antwerp, she once again was on the front lines, as part of the city was still a dangerous battleground. At the end of the war, Macham took on the task of closing several Canadian General Hospitals.

Years later, when asked why she had enrolled in the military, Macham responded “I was patriotic; this was an opportunity to do something different.”

== Postwar service ==
Macham returned to Canada in 1945. In January 1946, Macham was appointed as Women’s College Hospital’s superintendent. Macham served on the staff of Women’s College Hospital for 30 years and retired as its Executive Director in 1975. Under her leadership, Women’s College Hospital was transformed from a 140-bed hospital into a 450-bed teaching institution. After her retirement from Women’s College Hospital, Dorothy Macham joined the staff of West Park Hospital as their Executive Director, where she worked for four years.

== Personal life ==
According to her CV, Macham was a member of the Toronto Cricket Club and the Metropolitan United Church. Her hobbies also included going to the theatre, gardening and weaving.

Macham died on July 12, 2002, at age 91.

== Awards, recognitions, and memberships ==
King George VI presented Macham with the Royal Red Cross Class 2 (ARRC) medal at Buckingham Palace. In 1976, the City of Toronto presented her with the city’s Award of Merit. She received an appointment to the Order of Canada on April 8, 1981.

Macham was a member of several associations, including: Nursing Sisters Association of Toronto, Hospital Council of Metropolitan Toronto, Citizens Advisory Committee of the Ontario Medical Association (1974) and the University Teaching Hospital Association.
