= Mary Ann Macham =

Enslaved American woman who escaped to England (1802–1893)

Mary Ann Macham (10 May 1802 – 5 April 1893; married name Blyth) was an enslaved American woman living in Virginia who escaped to England in 1830 and lived in North Shields, Northumberland, where she died aged 92.

== Life ==
Macham was born 10 May 1802, in Middlesex County, Virginia, the child of an enslaved woman, Judy, who was raped by "a gentleman's son". She was separated from her mother at the age of 15 months, and sent to her father's sister's estate, to avoid scandal. She was well treated there, until her aunt died and she became the property of her aunt's son-in-law. She was sold at auction aged 12, for $450, and spent 17 years in slavery at a property in the Tidewater Region of Virginia, where she was very harshly treated, with frequent whippings. After being locked up on a Sunday she escaped by climbing out of an upstairs window which had been nailed shut. With the help of a slave from a neighbouring estate, she hid in woods and at one time inside a haystack, until being smuggled aboard an English ship, the Atlas. After an Atlantic crossing of about 60 days, and a stay of 7 weeks in Flushing in the Netherlands, she crossed to England, landing in Grimsby. She then travelled via Hull and York to North Shields, where she was taken into the care of two Quaker sisters, the Misses Spence.

Some sources state that she arrived in North Shields on Christmas Day 1831, but a letter she dictated to her mother is dated April 1831, which appears to confirm other sources which say she arrived on Christmas Day 1830.

She married John Blyth, a rope-maker, in 1840. He died in 1877, and was buried in Preston cemetery. Macham died on 5 April 1893 and was buried alongside her husband, although her grave was not marked until a stone was installed in 2020.

== Legacy ==
A letter to her mother, dictated by Macham to a local minister in April 1831, is held in the Virginia Museum of History and Culture. It describes her enslaved life and her escape and journey to England.

Macham dictated an account of her life in 1875 and expanded it in 1890. This was published in 1950 in Tynemouth Parish Church Magazine.

A statue of her by sculptor Keith Barrett was installed on the riverside in North Shields in 2025.
