= Creemore =

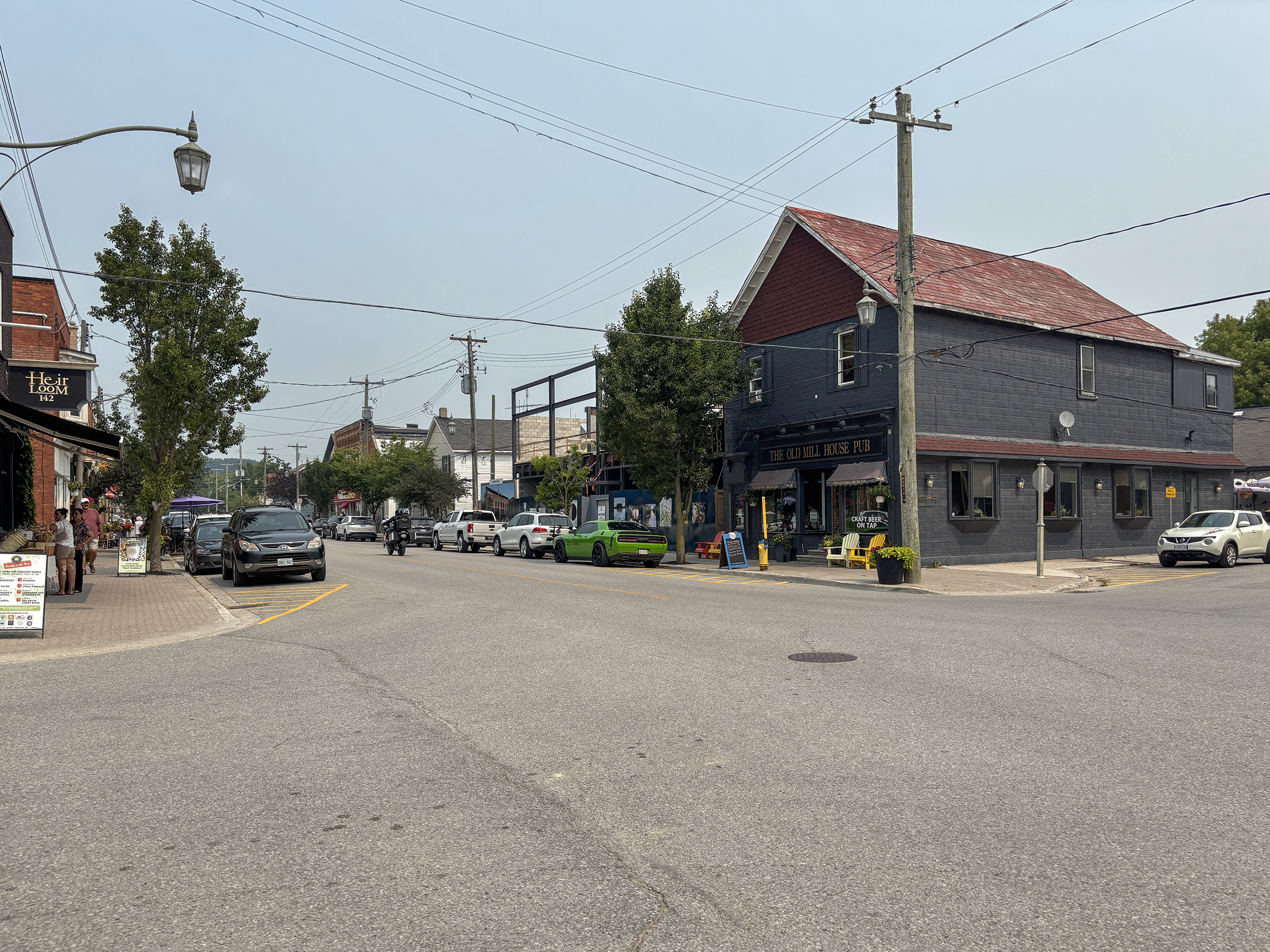
- Mill Street at Elizabeth Street East in Creemore (2025)

- Location of Creemore, Ontario Creemore (Canada)
- Coordinates: 44°19′N 80°06′W
- Country: Canada
- Province: Ontario
- County: Simcoe
- Municipality: Clearview

Government
  - Mayor: Doug Measures
  - MP: Terry Dowdall (C)
  - MPP: Brian Saunderson (PC)

Area
  - Total: 1.59 km^{2} (0.61 sq mi)

Population (2021)
  - Total: 1,194
  - Density: 750.8/km^{2} (1,945/sq mi)
- Time zone: UTC−05:00 (EST)
  - Summer (DST): UTC−04:00 (EDT)
- Postal code: L0M

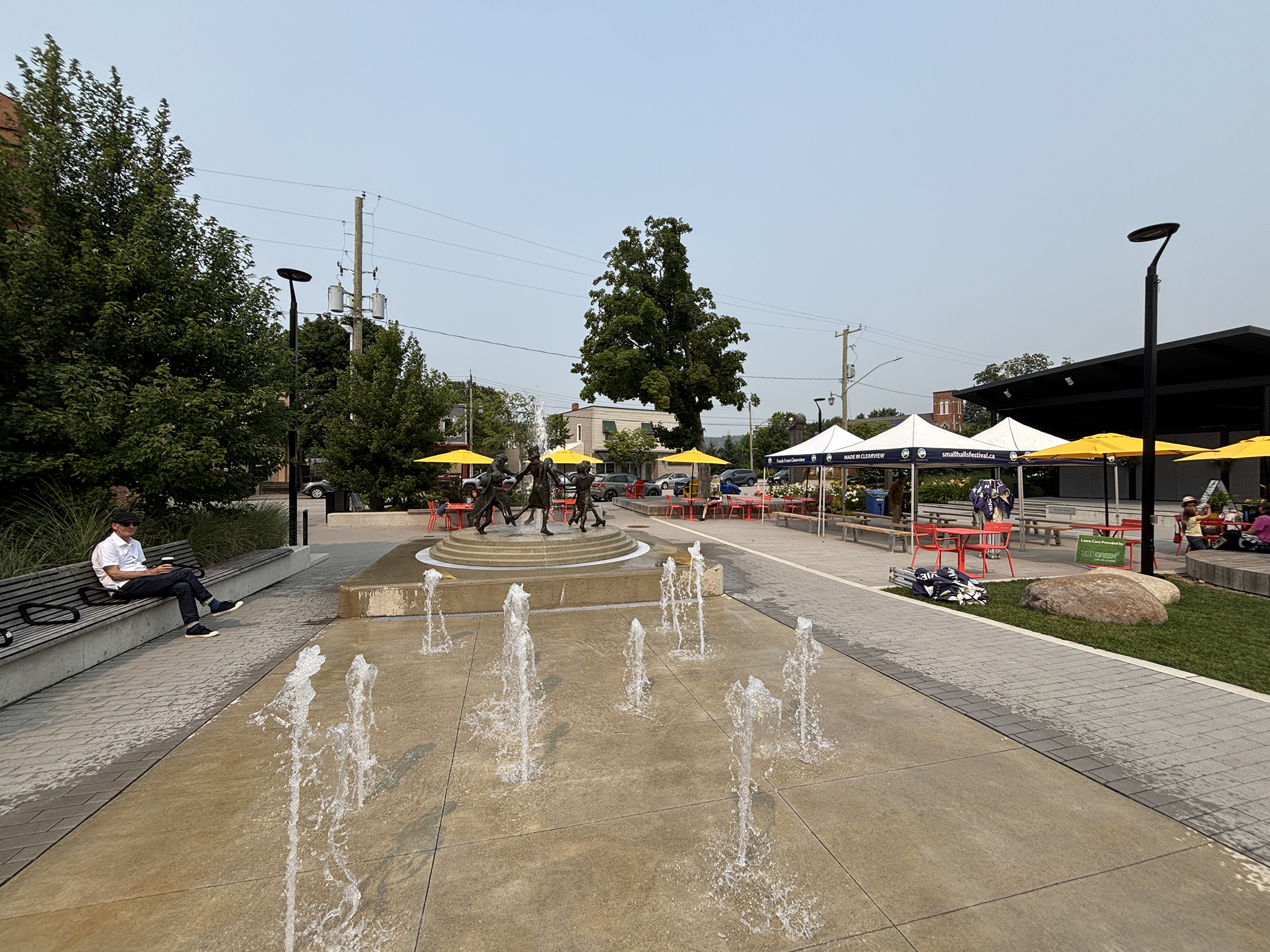
Creemore Horticultural Park

Creemore (from Irish Croí Mór 'big heart') is a former village, now part of Clearview Township, located in Simcoe County, Ontario, Canada. It lies approximately 130 km (81 mi) north of Toronto, 40 minutes west of Barrie, and 20 minutes south of Collingwood and Georgian Bay. It sits on the eastern boundary of the Niagara Escarpment.

Creemore purportedly has North America's smallest jail. Coboconk and Tweed make similar claims of their jails.

== History ==
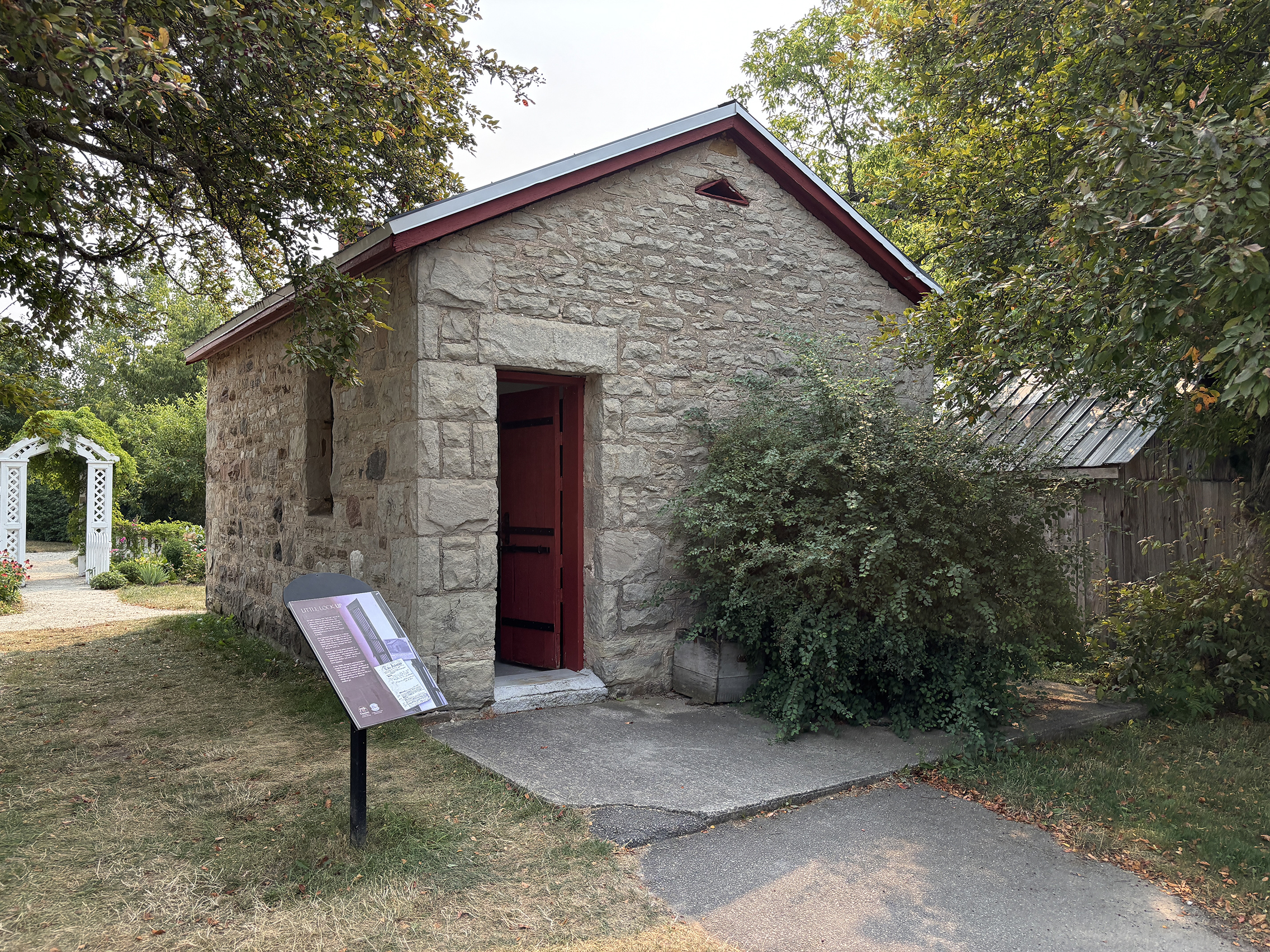
Creemore Jail is North America's smallest jail

French explorer Samuel de Champlain first visited the Creemore area in 1616 to promote trade with the Petun, a First Nations tribe. He was the first to write a description of the area: “The country is full of hill-slopes and little level stretches, which make it a pleasant country.’

Before explorers arrived in the early 17th century, indigenous people lived in the general area of Creemore. Some of these native tribes included: Petun, Wyandot (Wendat), Iroquois, and Algonquin. Soon, early white explorers arrived to trade with these native tribes. Along with the arrival of the explorers, English civilization was soon imported into the area that we now know as Creemore. The settlement of Creemore began in 1842, and by the turn of the century it was a thriving village of about 800 people with a vibrant business community.

Creemore's name and town origins have strong Irish roots – the name is derived from the Irish “croí mór,” which means “big heart” and it was the village's founder, Irish entrepreneur Edward Webster who coined the name in the year 1845. He paid tribute to his family by naming the original streets after them: Elizabeth (for his wife and daughter), Francis and Wellington (for his sons), and Alice and William (for his parents).

In 1993, the amalgamation of Sunnidale, Nottawasaga, Village of Creemore and the Town of Stayner took place and it became Clearview Township.

== Demographics ==
Canada census – Creemore community profile

	2021	2016
Population	1,194 (+2.1% from 2016)	1,170 (+2.0% from 2011)
Land area	1.59 km^{2} (0.61 sq mi)	1.59 km^{2} (0.61 sq mi)
Population density	750.8/km^{2} (1,945/sq mi)	739.8/km^{2} (1,916/sq mi)
Median age	48.8 (M: 46.8, F: 50.8)	49.0 (M: 46.0, F: 51.3)
Private dwellings	508 (total) 469 (occupied)	487 (total) 459 (occupied)
Median household income	$84,000	$66,347

References: 2021 2016

As of the 2021 census Creemore was approximately 93.0% white, 2.5% visible minorities and 4.5% Indigenous.

== Economy ==
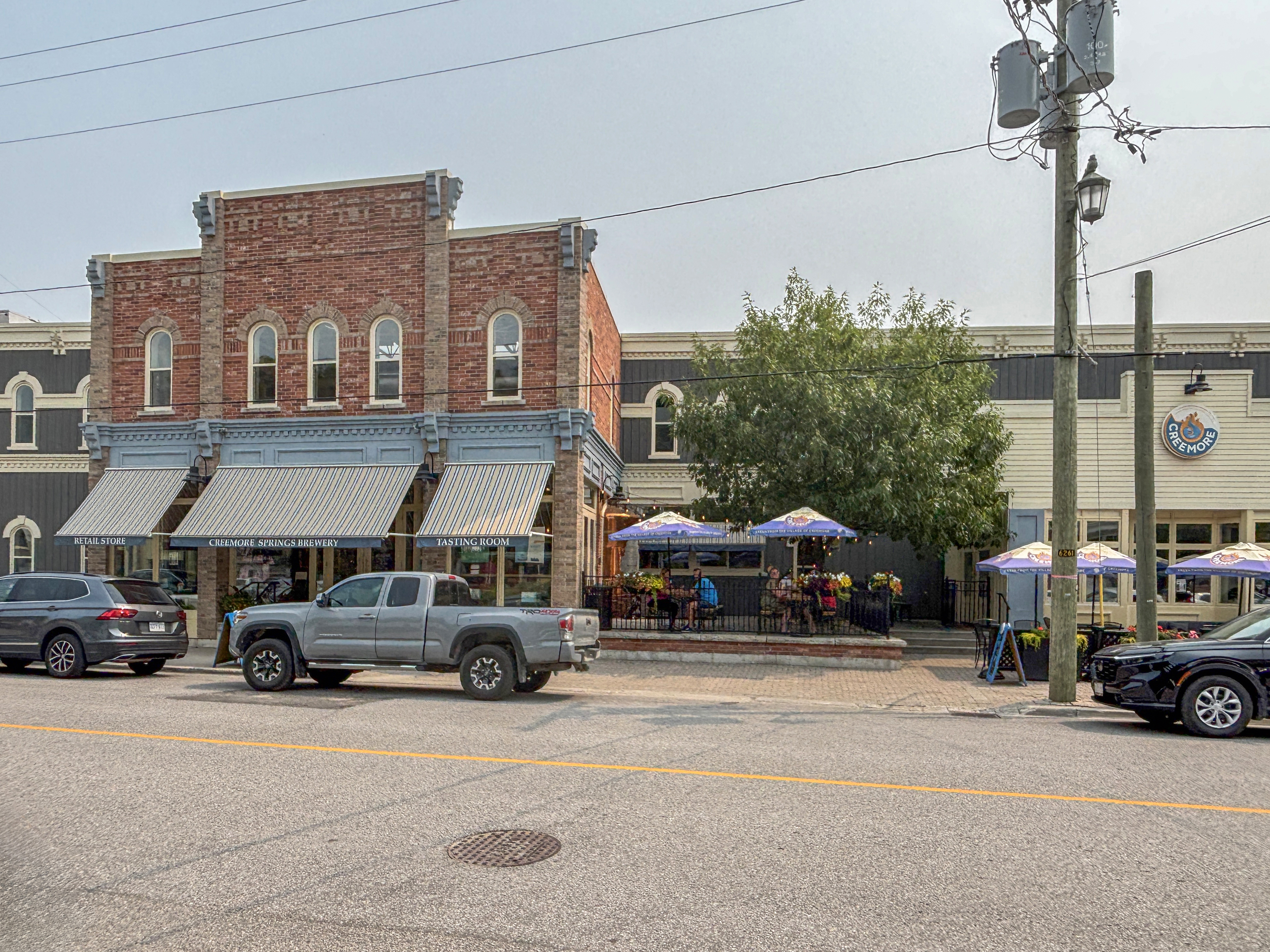
Creemore Springs brewery

Creemore is the home to Creemore Springs Brewery. The microbrewery was acquired by Molson on April 22, 2005. Each year the Copper Kettle festival attracts many, closing the main street with activities and antique automobile displays, bands, farm animals and many other attractions for young and old.

== Gallery ==
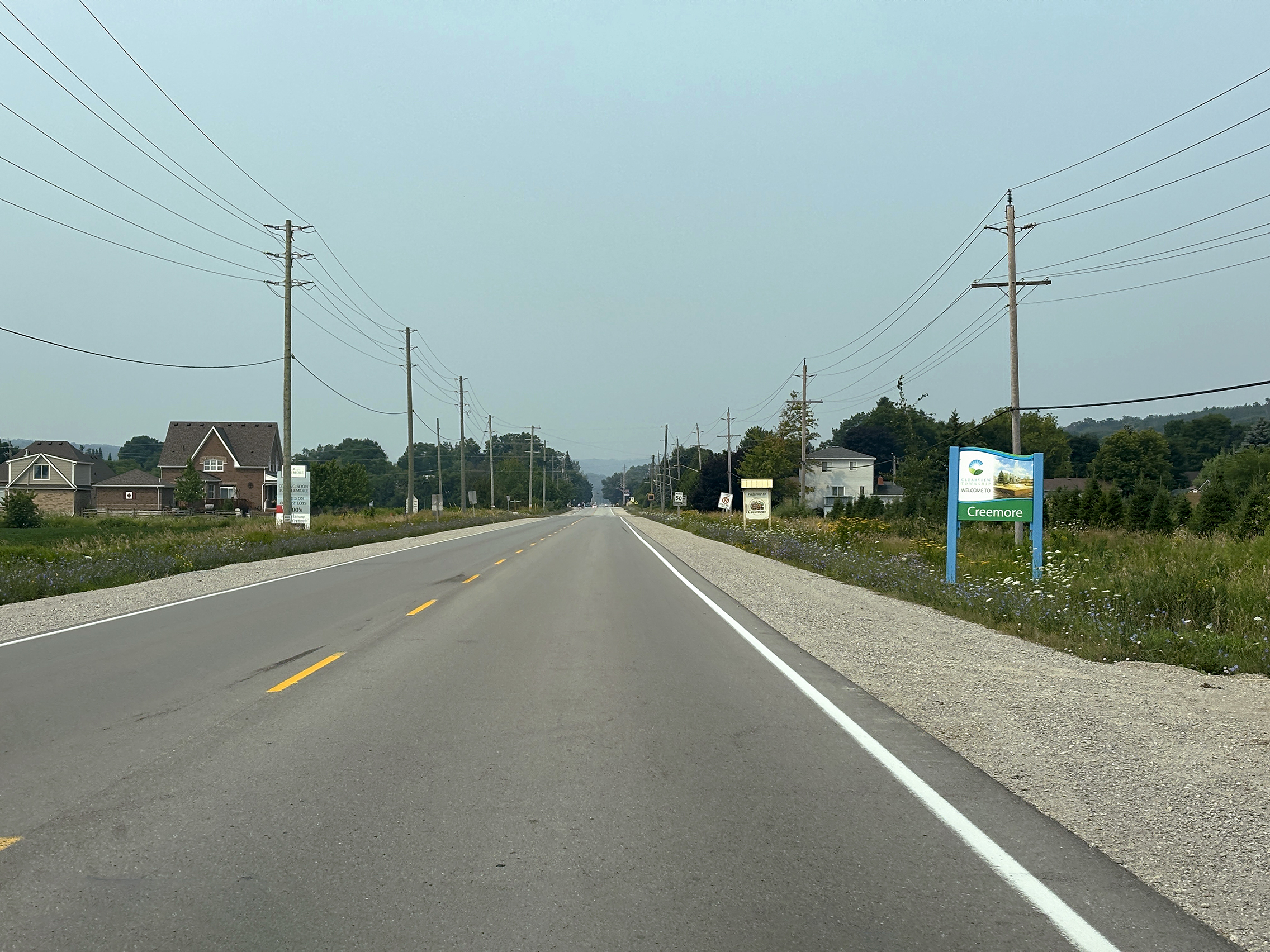
County Road 9 in Creemore

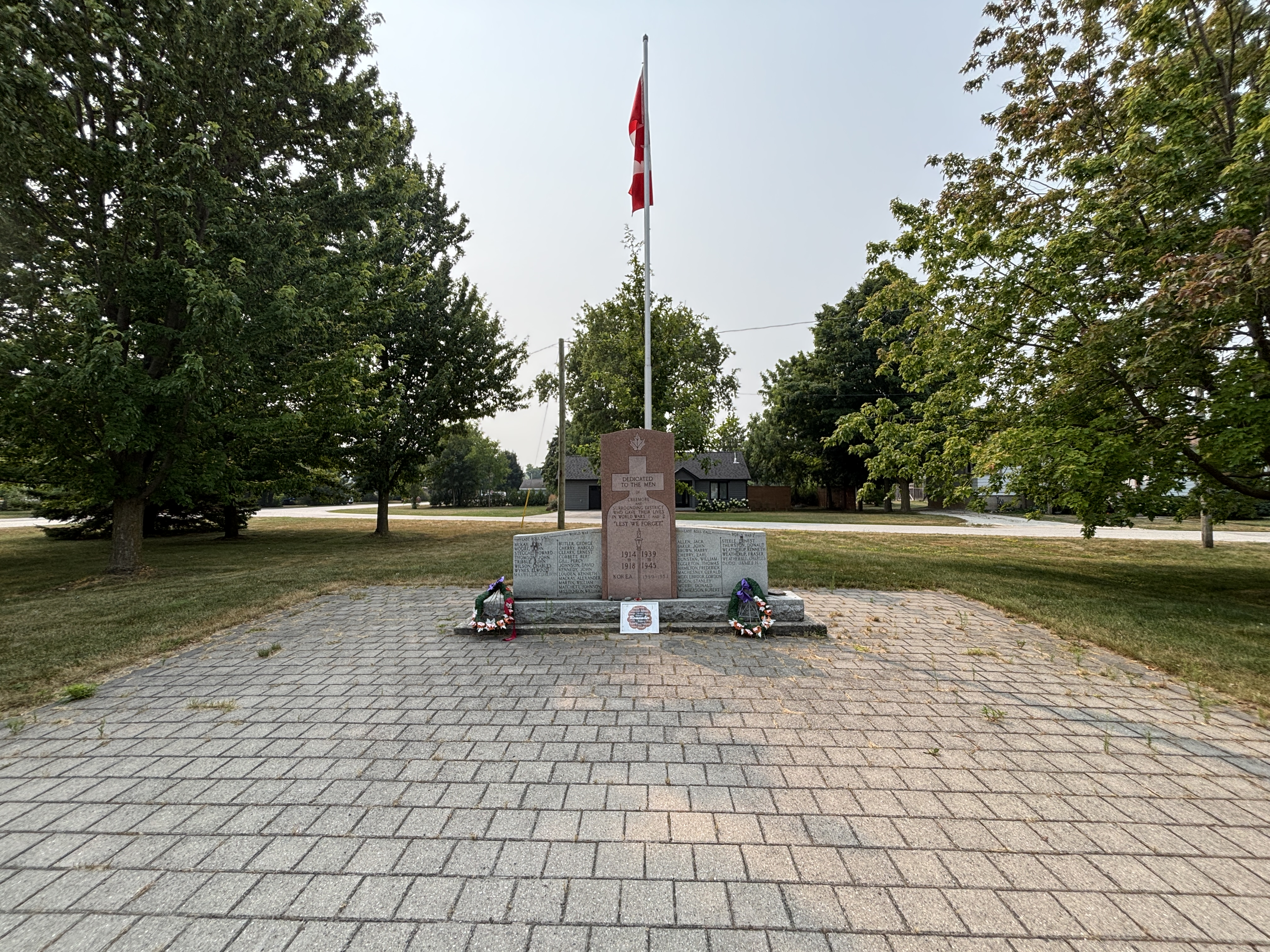
Memorial Statue in Creemore

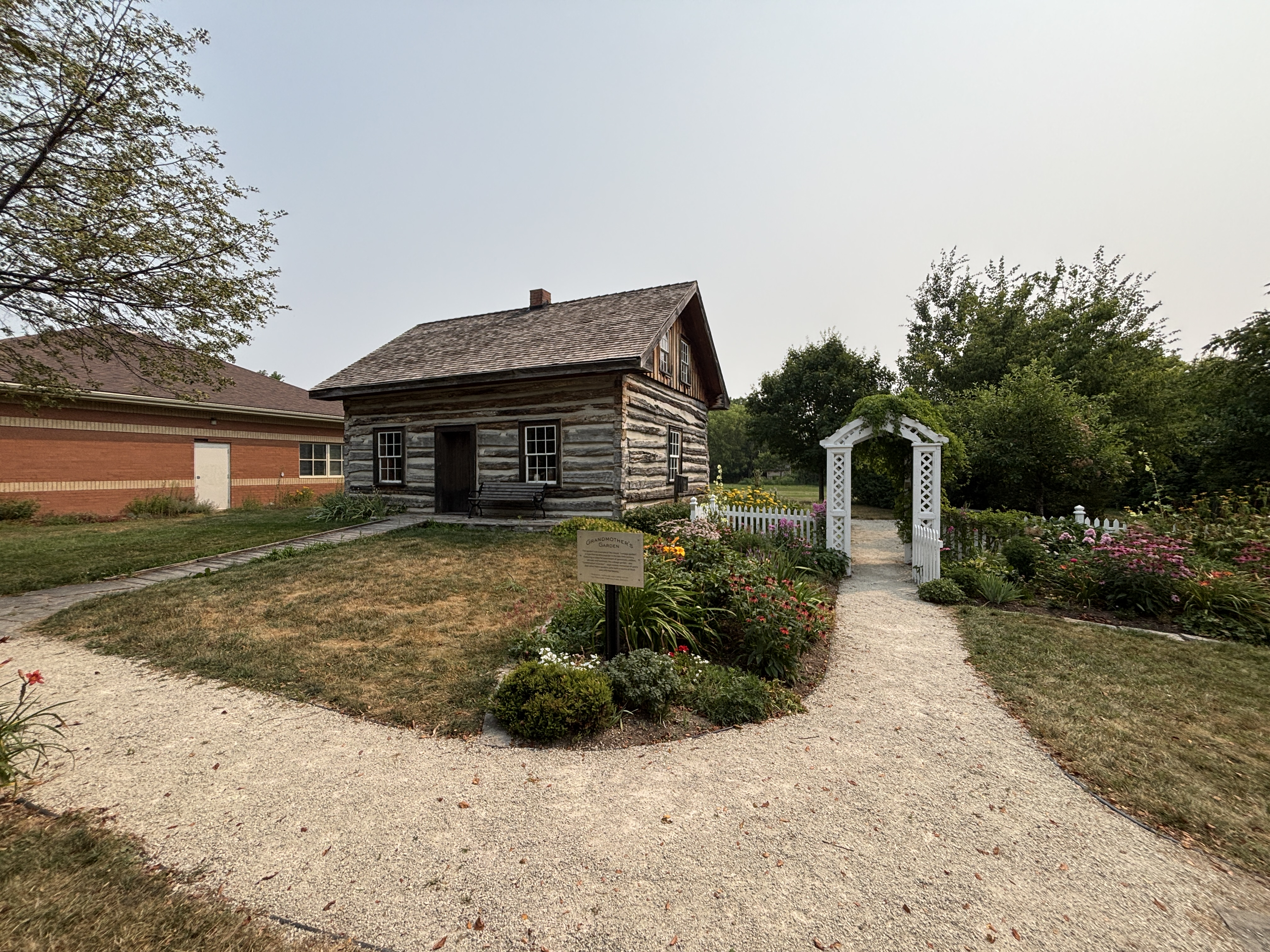
Historic Creemore Log Cabi

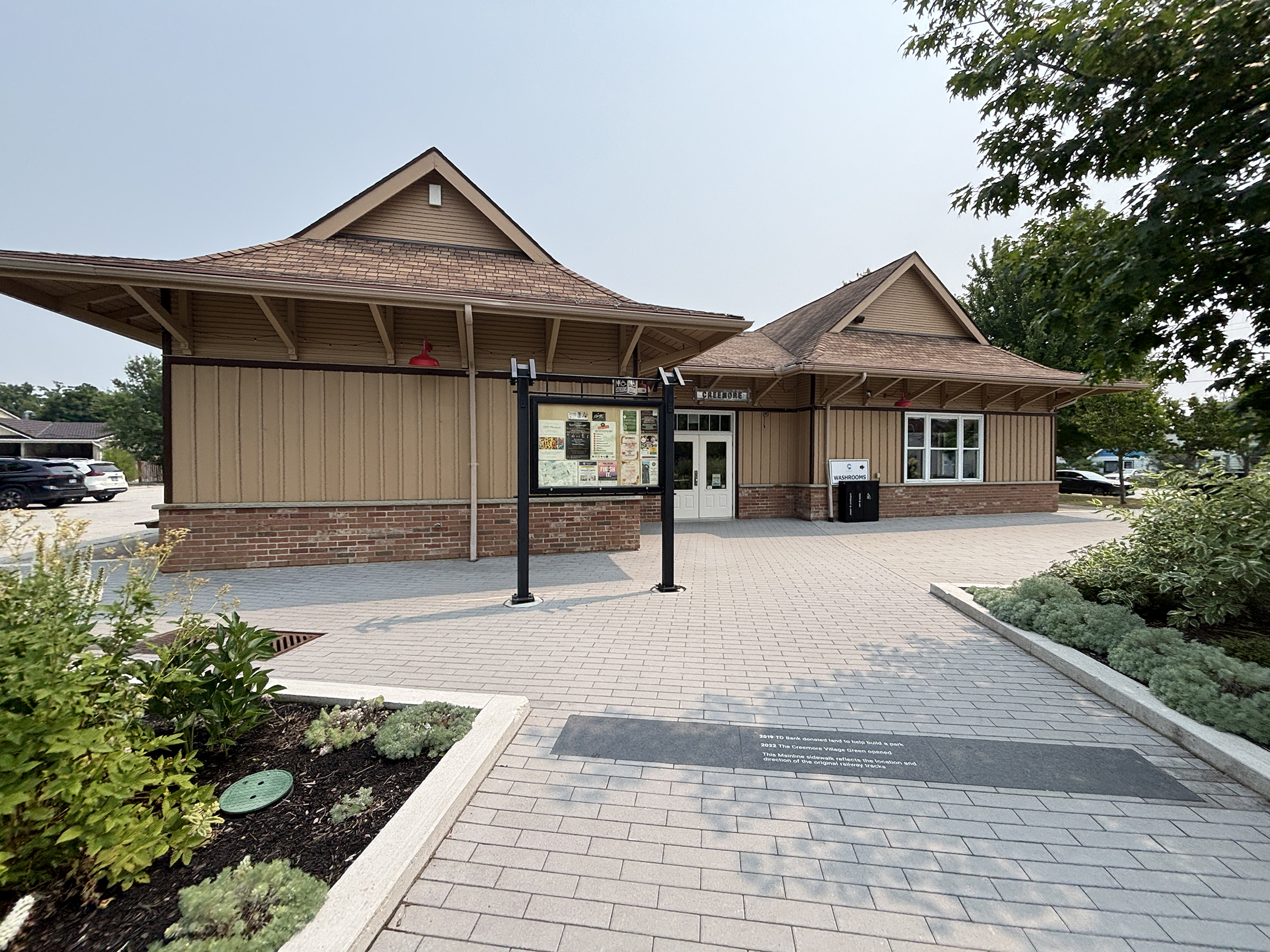
Former Creemore Station
