= John Jacques (furniture manufacturer) =

Canadian manufacturer and financier (1804–1886)

John Jacques (9 November 1804 – 14 February 1886) was a Canadian cabinet-maker, furniture manufacturer, and financier.

In 1835, Jacques, along with Robert Hay, bought William Maxwell's furniture business and established Jacques and Hay. The firm was a leading manufacturer in Canada for half a century. In the middle of the 19th century they helped establish the southern Ontario furniture style. This style was epitomized by the use of black walnut, the absence of veneer and more muted ornamentation than was typical for the period.
