= Beer in Serbia =

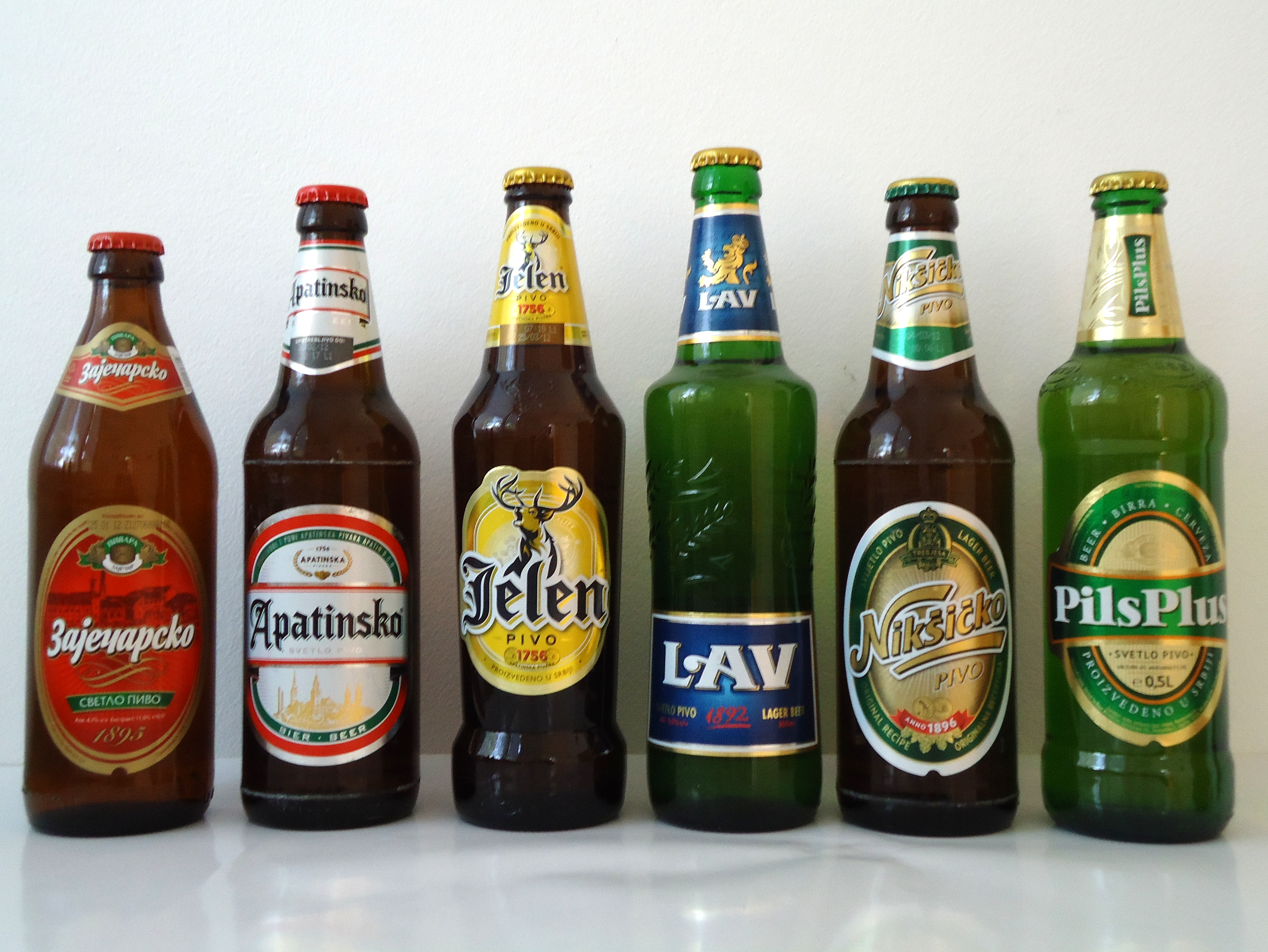
Bottles of popular Serbian brands

Beer (Serbian: пиво, romanized: pivo) is a popular beverage in Serbia.

== History ==
Beer was first mentioned in the 15th century during the reign of the despot Stefan Lazarević, as a new drink brought from the neighboring Kingdom of Hungary. It was brewed in households, taverns, and even in Belgrade Fortress, the residence of the despot. Its popularity rose several centuries later and industrial-scale production began in the mid-18th century.

== Production, packaging and consumption ==
Serbian breweries produce 523 million liters annually, which place country as 43rd largest beer producer in the world. Serbia exports some 138 million liters annually, mainly to neighboring countries, such as Bosnia and Herzegovina (79 million L), Bulgaria (22.3 million L), Montenegro (12.7 million L), Hungary (12.4 million L) or Croatia (11.9 million L), and to a minor extent to countries where there is significant Serbian diaspora, such as Germany, Austria, United States, Canada and Australia.

Beer for home consumption is mostly sold in 0.5-liter bottles of deposit type (reused) and 0.33-liter glass bottles, as well as cans. Most breweries began packing their product in plastic Q-pack bottles of 1.5, 2 or even 2.5 litres. In bars and restaurants, beer is either served in 0.33L or 0.5L bottles or as "draught" (točeno).

Serbia ranks 38th by beer consumption per capita, with 60 litres a year.

== Breweries and brands ==
=== Breweries ===
There are three main breweries in Serbia which combined, control 95% of market share. These are: Apatin Brewery, Heineken Srbija and Carlsberg Srbija. The remaining of market share is controlled by domestic breweries Valjevo Brewery, BIP Brewery, Jagodina Brewery and Niš Brewery and 20 other minor breweries.

Most popular domestic brand is Zaječarsko, followed by Jelen and Lav. Some foreign brands are distributed, while some are produced locally under license (mostly by its respective brand owners).

Pale lager has been the traditional beer choice for Serbians, and dark lager, while being popular, is produced in smaller quantities. Some breweries produce kvass.

=== Brands ===
Domestic

- Apatin Brewery (Jelen, Apatinsko, Jelen Cool, Jelen Fresh)
- Čelarevo Brewery (Lav, Merak)
- Novi Sad Brewery (Pils Plus, MB, Master)
- Zaječar Brewery (Zaječarsko, Zaječarsko crno)
- Valjevo Brewery (Valjevsko)
- BIP Brewery (BIP, Bg)
- Jagodina Brewery (Jagodinsko)
- Niš Brewery (Niško)

Foreign

- Apatin Brewery (Beck's, Stella Artois, Staropramen, Nikšićko)
- Čelarevo Brewery (Carlsberg, Tuborg, Holsten)
- Novi Sad Brewery (Heineken, Amstel)

== Beer festivals ==
=== Belgrade Beer Fest ===
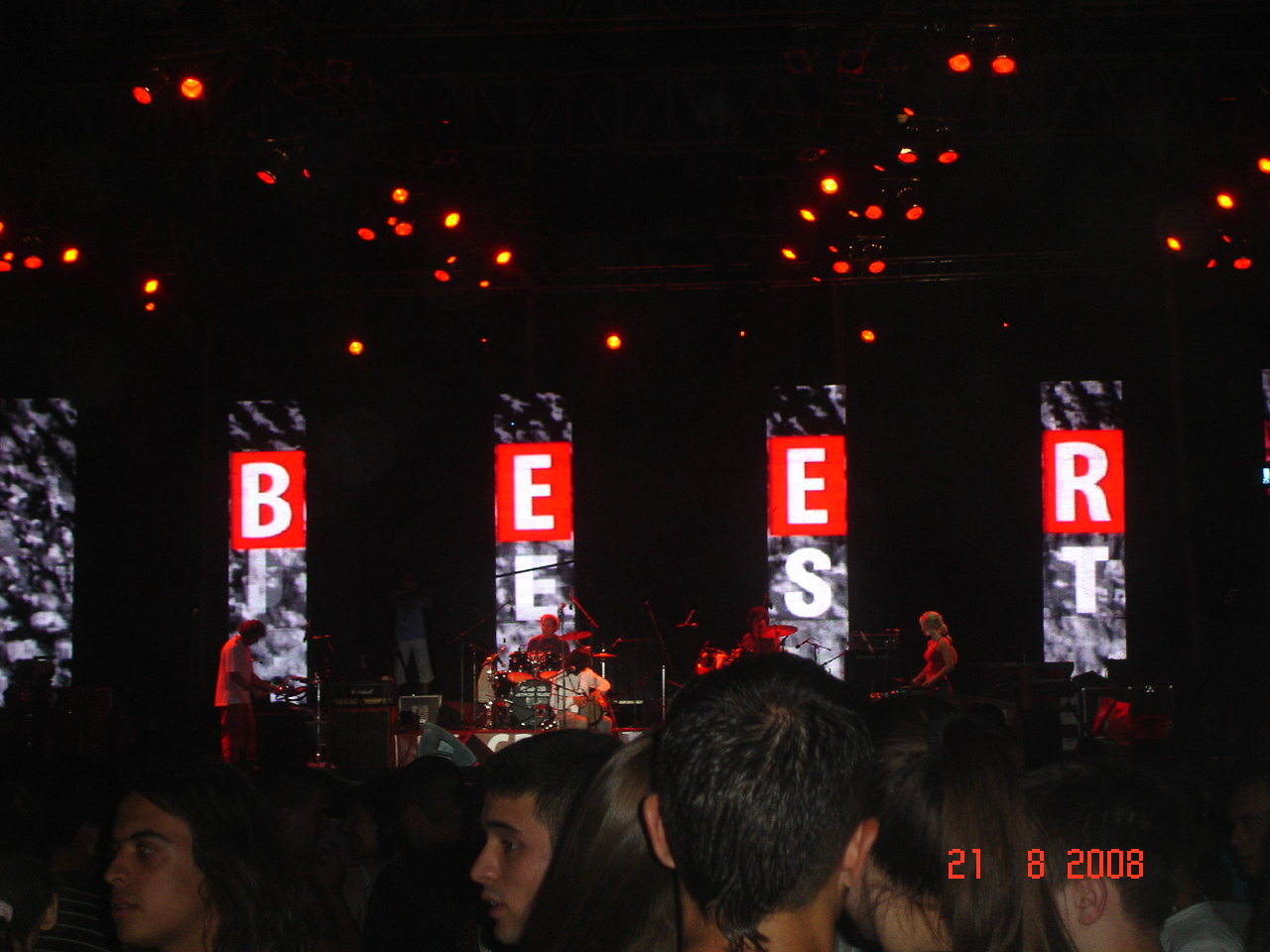
Belgrade Beer Fest in 2008

Started in 2003, Belgrade Beer Fest is held annually over 3–4 days at the foot of Belgrade's Kalemegdan fortress as a showcase event for various beer producers. In addition to domestic and foreign brews at affordable prices, the festival features live music performances each evening. It has quickly grown in size and popularity. On 31 December 2005 British daily The Independent named it as one of the worldwide events to visit in 2006.

=== Dani piva ===
Dani Piva (Beer Days) is a beer festival in Zrenjanin, started in 1985, organised by the Zrenjanin Brewery (Serbian: Zrenjaninska industrija piva).

== See also ==
- Beer and breweries by region
