= Valjevo Brewery =

Brewery in western Serbia

- Official logo
- Native name: Ваљевска пивара Valjevska pivara
- Company type: d.o.o.
- Industry: Beverages
- Founded: 28 February 1952; 74 years ago First founded in 1860
- Headquarters: Valjevo, Serbia
- Area served: Serbia
- Key people: Aleksandar Rajevac (Director)
- Products: Beers, soft drinks, vinegar and yeast
- Production output: 100,000 hl (2015)
- Revenue: ▼€4.24 million (2018)
- Net income: ▼ (€0.49 million) (2018)
- Total assets: ▼€8.48 million (2018)
- Total equity: ▼€7.90 million (2018)
- Owner: Government of Serbia (100%)
- Number of employees: 197 (2018)
- Website: valjevskapivara.rs

Valjevo Brewery (Serbian: Valjevska pivara) is a Serbian brewery based in Valjevo.

== History ==
The origins of Valjevo Brewery trace back to 1860 and in current form it operates since 28 February 1952.

In 2003, Valjevo Brewery was sold to consortium "Atlas Grupa" for 22 million dinars. In July 2010, the company went into bankruptcy procedure due to insolvency and in January 2011 the Government of Serbia took over it by converting its debts to shares.

As of February 2016, Valjevo Brewery was the sole government-owned brewery in Serbia that operated positively, although it has minor market share compared to Carlsberg Srbija, Apatin Brewery and Heineken Srbija.

In October 2018, the Ministry of Economy of Serbia auctioned Valjevo Brewery for 7.05 million euros, but there were no interested parties. On 17 January 2019, in a second auction, the brewery was sold for 3.5 million euros to the Serbian newly established company "Brauerei Group".
