= Novi Sad Brewery =

Serbia owned by Heineken Srbija

- Location: Novi Sad, Serbia
- Opened: 2003; 22 years ago
- Annual production volume: 1.5 million hl
- Owned by: Heineken Srbija

Novi Sad Brewery (Serbian: Novosadska pivara; full legal name: Pivara MB d.o.o. za proizvodnju piva Novi Sad) is a brewery in Serbia owned by Heineken Srbija. It started production in 2003 and is the youngest brewery operating in the country.

== History ==
Former logo of MB pivo

The brewery was founded as MB Brewery (Serbian: pivara MB). Through an aggressive marketing campaign that featured a "Svetsko, a naše" ("Global, but ours") slogan and a series of public personalities such as Lazar Ristovski, Ceca Ražnatović, and Pierluigi Collina, it quickly established its MB pivo brand.

At the time when Rodić Company decided to sell the brewery it held 7% of Serbian beer market with annual production of 1.5 million hectolitres, placing it fourth - behind Apatin Brewery, Carlsberg Srbija, and Efes Srbija.

In 2007, Dutch beer producer Heineken International announced its purchase of Brewery MB. The amount of the transaction was not disclosed. The takeover was finalized on 19 February 2008 at which time it was also announced that the company is changing its name to Brauerei MB.

In 2008, Heineken's Braurei MB (Novi Sad Brewery) merged with Efes Srbija (Zaječar and Pančevo breweries) to establish a new entity - Ujedinjene srpske pivare (United Breweries of Serbia), later renamed Heineken Srbija.

== Brands ==
Brands produced in Novi Sad Brewery are: Laško, Krušovice, Zaječarsko low-pasteurized, Pils Plus, MB, Master, Heineken and Amstel beer.
