= Trebjesa brewery =

Montenegrin brewery

Trebjesa Brewery
- Native name: Pivara Trebjesa; Пивара Требјеса
- Type: Public
- Industry: Alcoholic beverage
- Founded: 1896
- Headquarters: Nikšić, Montenegro
- Products: Beer
- Number of employees: 230
- Parent: Molson Coors
- Website: www.niksickopivo.com

Trebjesa Brewery (Pivara Trebjesa; MNSE: TRNK) is the largest brewery in Montenegro. It is based in Nikšić, and is owned by Molson Coors. It produces a small range of pale lagers under the "Nik" brand name.

In the state union of Serbia and Montenegro, with around 53 million litres of beer produced annually, it was second by beer production, just behind Apatin Brewery.

Beer from Trebjesa brewery is by far the most popular and most consumed beer in Montenegro. Besides the domestic market and that of Serbia, Nikšićko beer and other variants have significant popularity in Croatia, Slovenia, Albania and Bosnia and Herzegovina. Some quantities of beer are exported to France, Germany, Switzerland, Canada and England.

== History ==
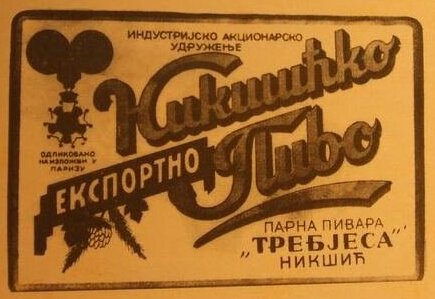
Bottle label from the time of the Kingdom of Yugoslavia, 1930s

Brewing industry in Montenegro traces its roots to 1896, when Vuko Krivokapić built Onogošt brewery in Nikšić. The construction of the brewery in the newly established Principality of Montenegro was endorsed and supported by Prince Nicholas.

In 1908, a number of entrepreneurs from Nikšić decided to build another brewery, named Trebjesa. The first beer came out of the brewery in 1911. The factory was burned during the First World War, and converted to a prison by occupying Austria-Hungary. After the war, the reconstruction was slow, and the brewery resumed operations in 1931. However, development was once again short-lived, as World War II once again brought destruction. After the liberation from the Axis powers, the brewery was nationalized, thoroughly reconstructed and expanded from 1946 to 1956, and quickly became one of the most recognizable Montenegrin brands.

The regional crisis during Yugoslav wars in the 1990s did affect the company, but it recovered relatively soon after the region stabilized, as inherent quality and regional brand awareness helped it to rebound quickly.

A majority stake in Trebjesa was acquired by Interbrew in 1997 for DM25 million.

In mid-October 2009, private equity fund CVC Capital Partners bought all of Anheuser–Busch InBev's holdings in Central Europe for €2.23 billion. They renamed the operations StarBev. In 2012, StarBev was acquired by Molson Coors. During the entire period in private ownership, the brewery expanded its operations to import and bottling various international brands, in addition to producing its signature Nikšićko brand. The company covers more than 90% of Montenegrin beer market, and is increasingly successful in regional market.

== Products ==
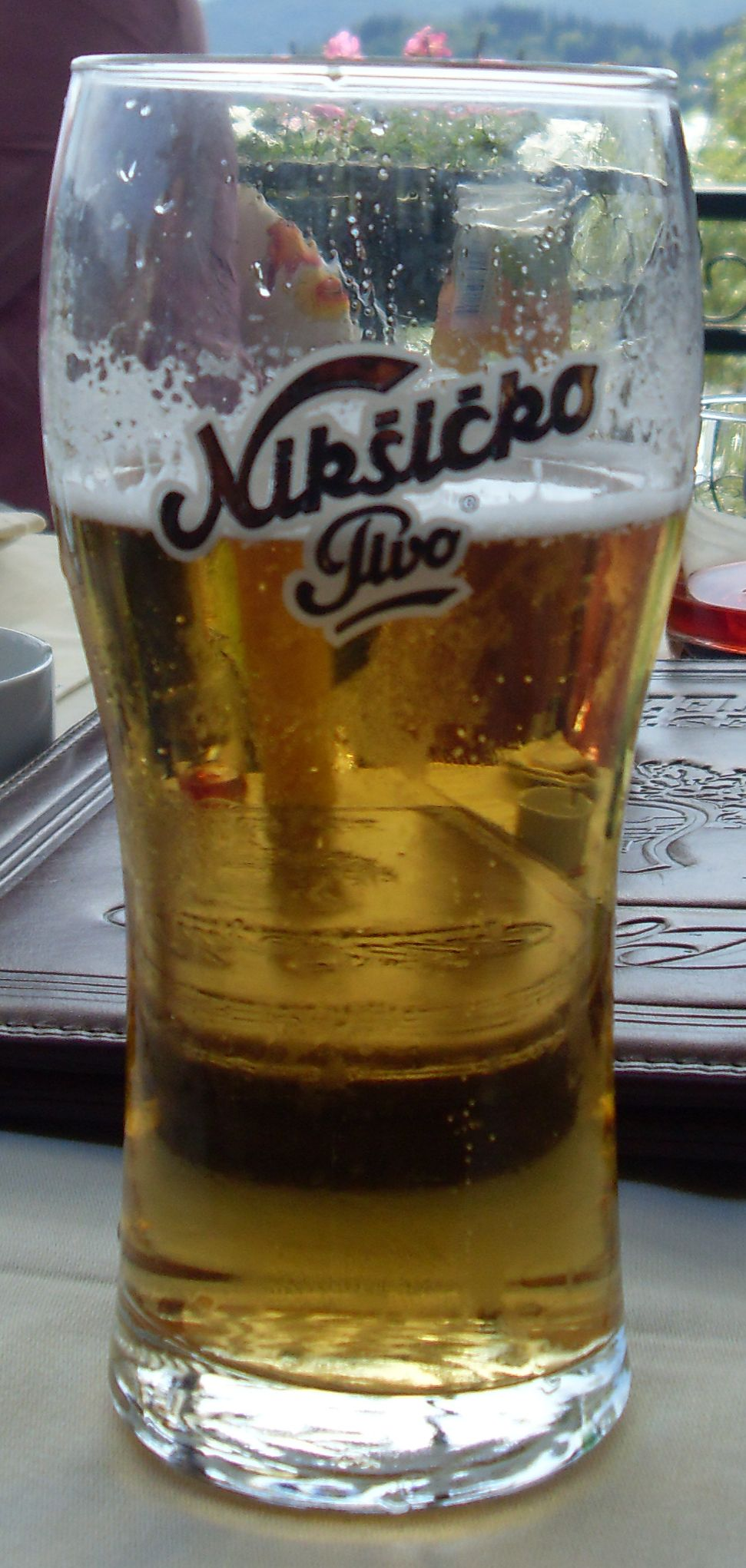
Nikšićko Beer

The company produces four lagers under the brand name "Nik": Nikšićko pivo, Nik Gold, Nik Cool, and Nikšićko tamno.

Besides Nikšićko beer, Beck's, Jelen and Staropramen beers are also bottled in Trebjesa brewery, and sold as domestic beers in Montenegro.

== Beer in Montenegro ==
Beer for home consumption is mostly sold in 500 ml, 330 ml, and 250 ml glass bottles, 330 ml or 500 ml cans. As of 2004, beer is very often sold in plastic Q-pack bottles of 2 litres. This beer is cheaper, though equal in quality. Half-litre glass bottles (popularly "mason's beer" – zidarsko pivo) are very common.

In bars, pubs and restaurants beer is either served in 500 ml or 330 ml bottles or as draught beer (točeno pivo), in 250 ml, 330 ml or 500 ml glasses.

Light beer dominates in Montenegro. Due to significantly lower consumption, dark beer is not as commonly present.

Beer in glass bottles costs around 1.2 euros per 500 ml, while plastic (2-litre bottles) cost around 2.6 euros. Beer in pubs costs around 1.7 euros per 330 ml bottle, and around 2.5 euros for 500 ml draught variant. In addition to domestic brand, the majority of bars serve the usual foreign fare of Heineken, Bavaria, Carlsberg, Tuborg, etc.
