= Lav pivo =

Serbian beer brand

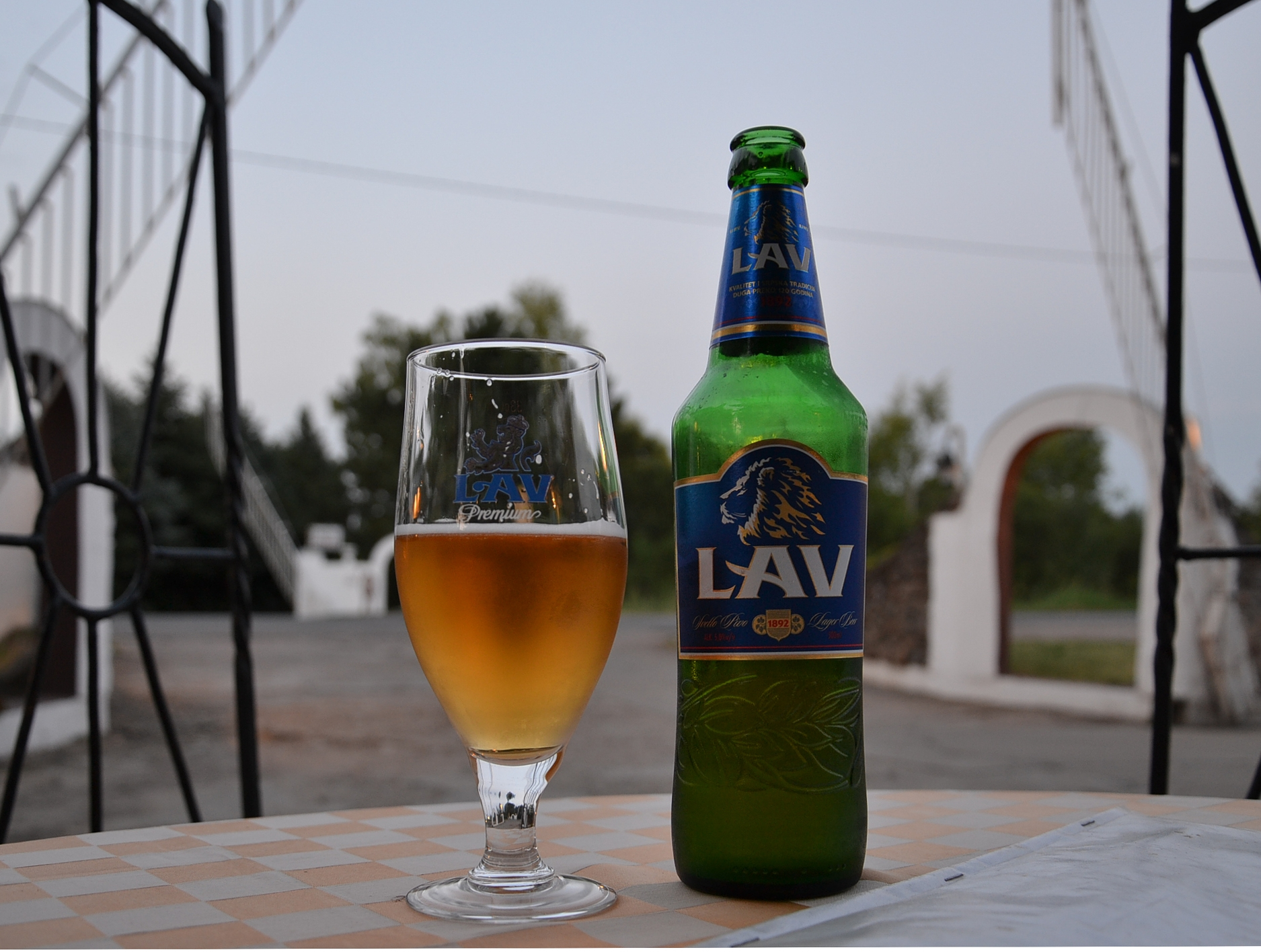
- Manufacturer: Carlsberg Srbija
- Alcohol by volume: 5.0%
- Style: Lager
- Website: www.lavpivo.rs

Lav pivo (Serbian Cyrillic: Лав пиво) is a Serbian beer brand. Produced and bottled by Carlsberg Srbija in the town of Čelarevo (Bačka Palanka municipality), it has the second-biggest market share among the beer brands in Serbia, behind their rivals Jelen. Lav means 'lion' in Serbian.

In addition to Serbia, it is also widespread in Montenegro and Bosnia and Herzegovina.

Lav used to sponsor the Serbia national football team. Lav's television campaign features a series of commercials featuring actor Nenad Jezdić.

Lav comes in three varieties: the regular one with 4.5% alcohol, the stronger one with 7%, known as Lav 7, and a "smooth" variety known as Lav Premium.

== See also ==
- Beer in Serbia
