= Ostravar Brewery =

Czech brewery

- Ostravar

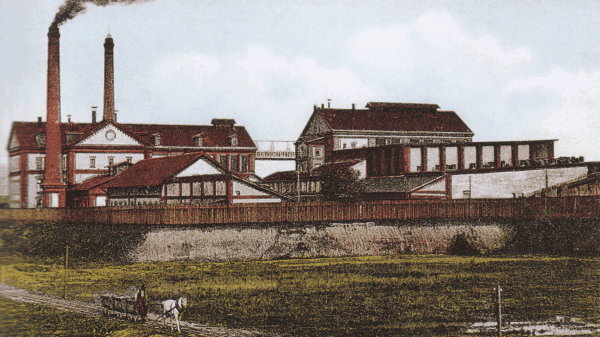
- Ostravar Brewery (1912)
- Location: Ostrava, Czech Republic
- Coordinates: 49°50′19.6″N 18°16′25.3″E
- Opened: 1897; 128 years ago
- Website: www.ostravar.cz

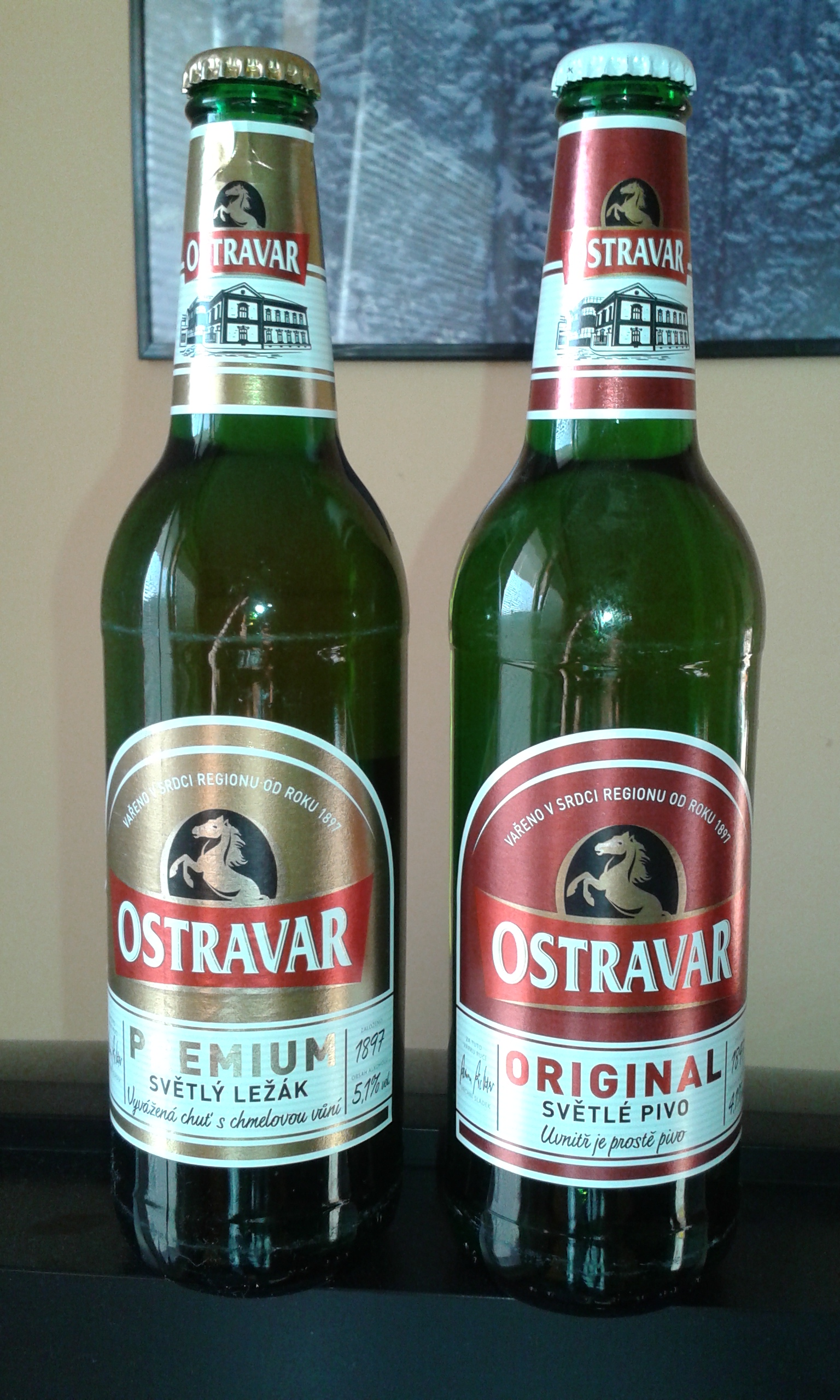
Ostravar beer

Ostravar Brewery (Czech: Pivovar Ostravar) is a Czech brewery located in the city of Ostrava. Ostravar was founded in 1897 as a joint stock company in Moravská Ostrava, and the first beer here was brewed in 1898. In 1997 the brewery was acquired by Bass, after a merger with the company Pražské pivovary a.s, which also brews Staropramen. It is one of the few Czech breweries which produces a dry stout, branded Kelt.

For most of its history the beer was only sold locally around Ostrava and the Moravian-Silesian region. In 2016 the brewery opened its first restaurant, called Ostravarna, and started an initiative to start selling the beer in other parts of the Czech Republic.

== Products ==
- Ostravar Original – a pale draught beer with 4.1% ABV (in Czech: 10° or Výčepní).
- Ostravar Mustang – a pale lager with 4.9% ABV (in Czech: 11° or Ležák).
- Ostravar Premium – a pale lager with 5.1% ABV (in Czech: 12° or Ležák).
- Ostravar Gavora – a special edition 11.4° wheat beer with 5.0% ABV (in Czech:Pšeničné).

== See also ==
- Beer in the Czech Republic
