= Church of the Assumption of Mary, Čelarevo =

Church of the Assumption of Mary
- Crkva uznesenja blažene djevice Marije
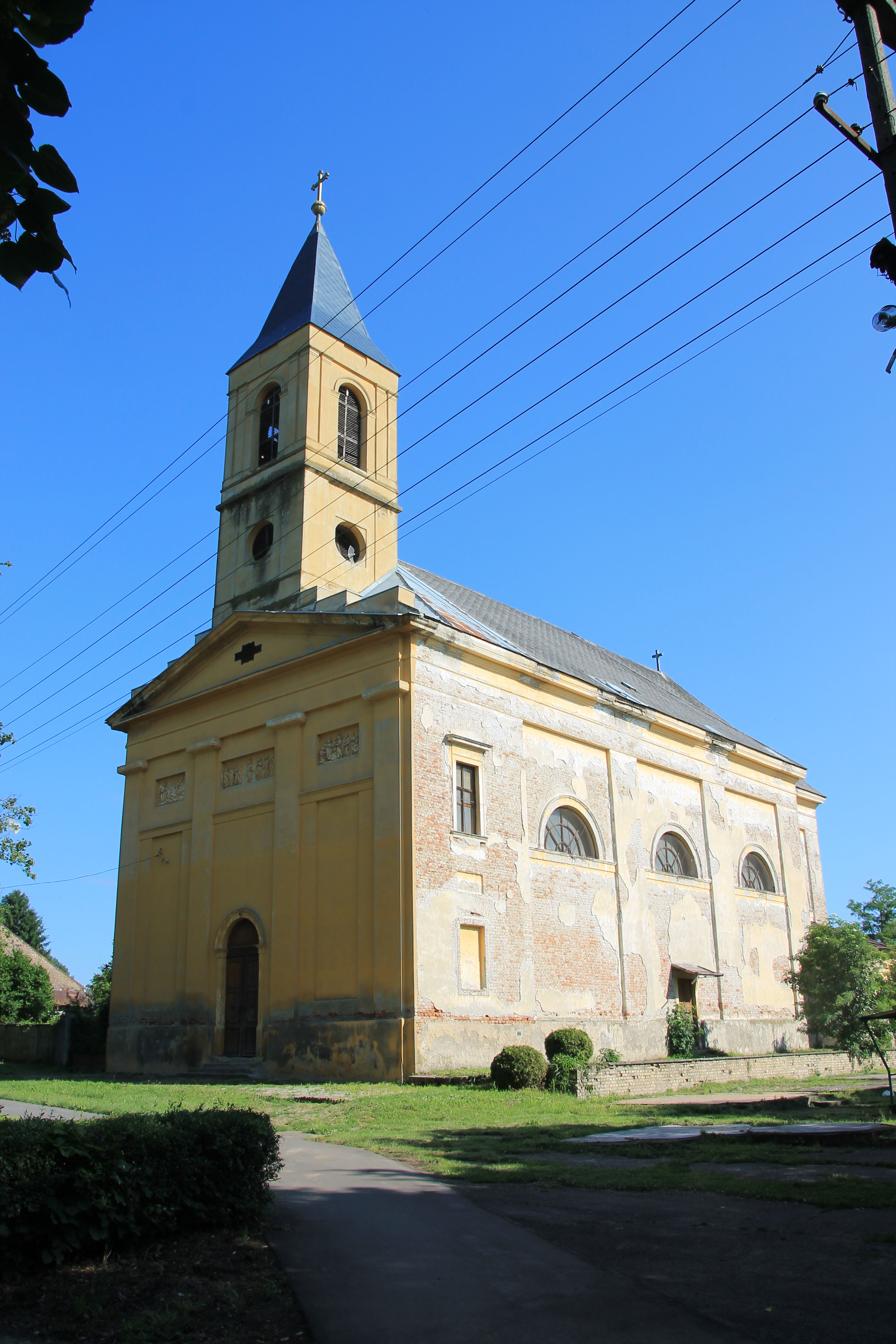
- Church of the Assumption of Mary
- Church of the Assumption of Mary
- 45°16′21″N 19°31′19″E
- Location: Čelarevo, Vojvodina
- Country: Serbia
- Denomination: Roman Catholic

History
- Dedication: Assumption of Mary

Architecture
- Style: Neoclassicism
- Years built: 1822

Administration
- Archdiocese: Roman Catholic Diocese of Subotica

Church of the Assumption of Mary (Serbo-Croatian: Crkva uznesenja blažene djevice Marije) is a Roman Catholic Parish church in Čelarevo in Vojvodina, Serbia. Local Roman Catholic parish in the village was mentioned for the first time in 1493 and the current church was completed in 1822. Parish books are available from 1802 onwards. The church, located centrally within the settlement, is surrounded by the park.
