= Čelarevo =

Čelarevo Челарево (Serbian) Čelarevo (Slovak) Čib Чиб
- Village (Selo)
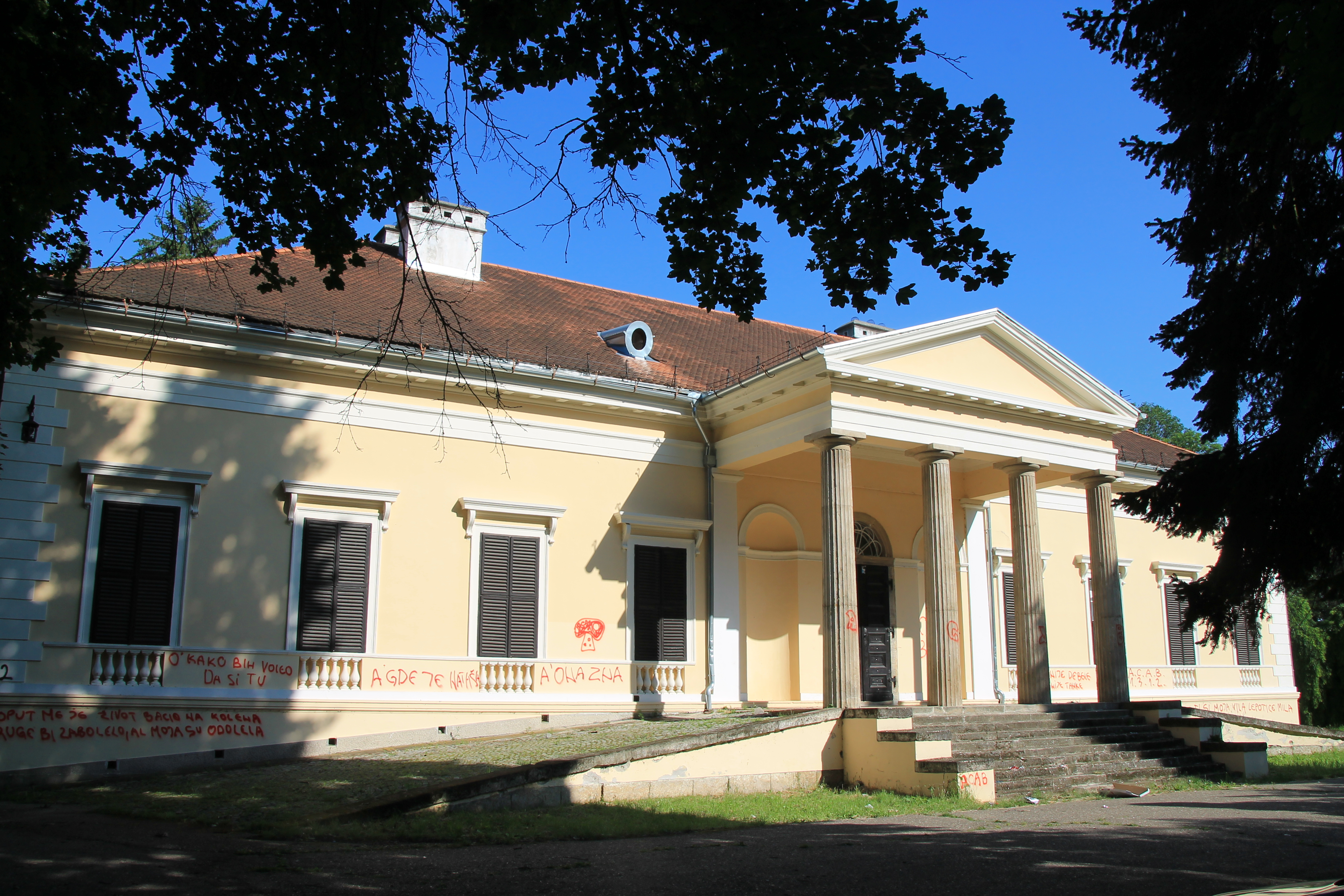
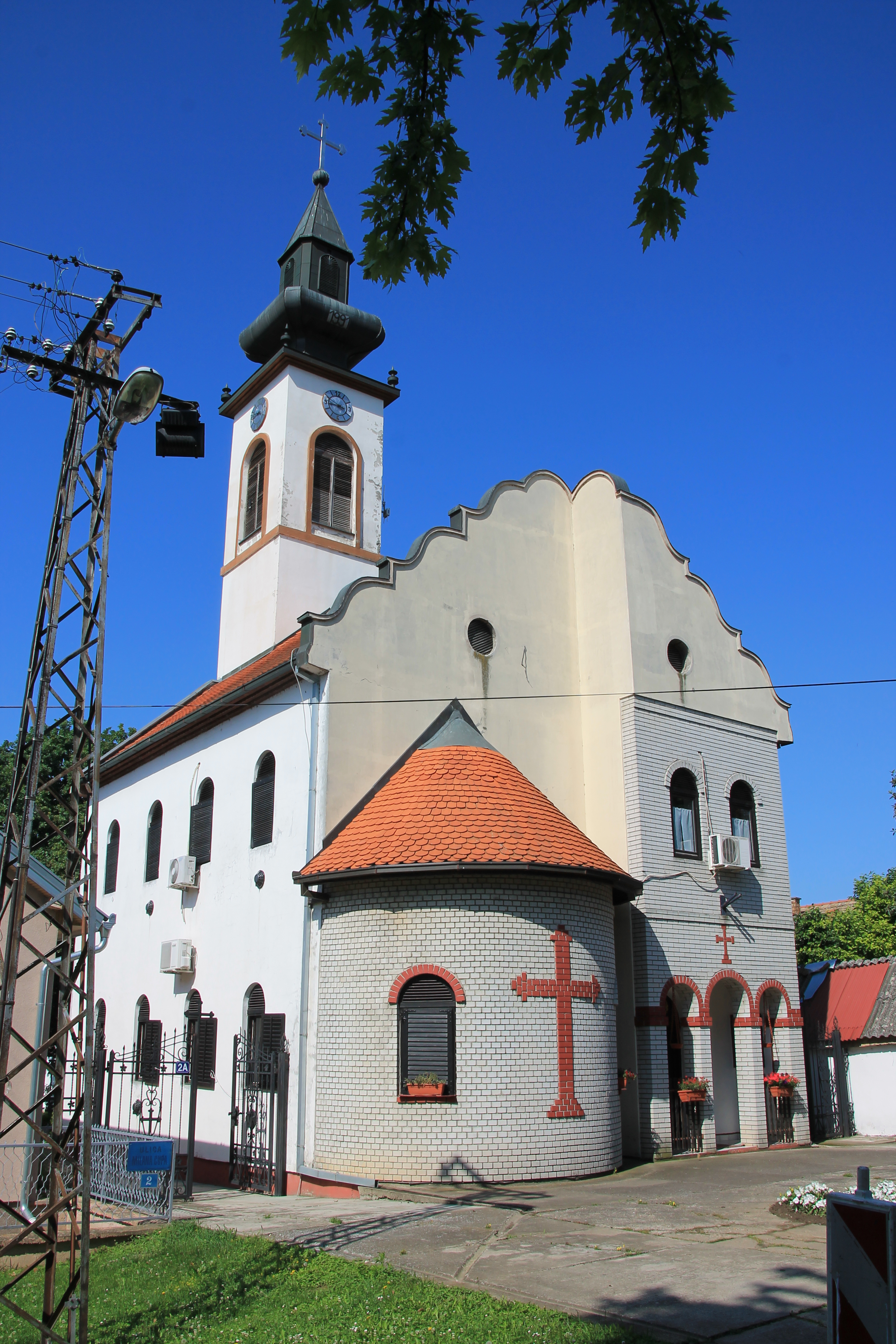
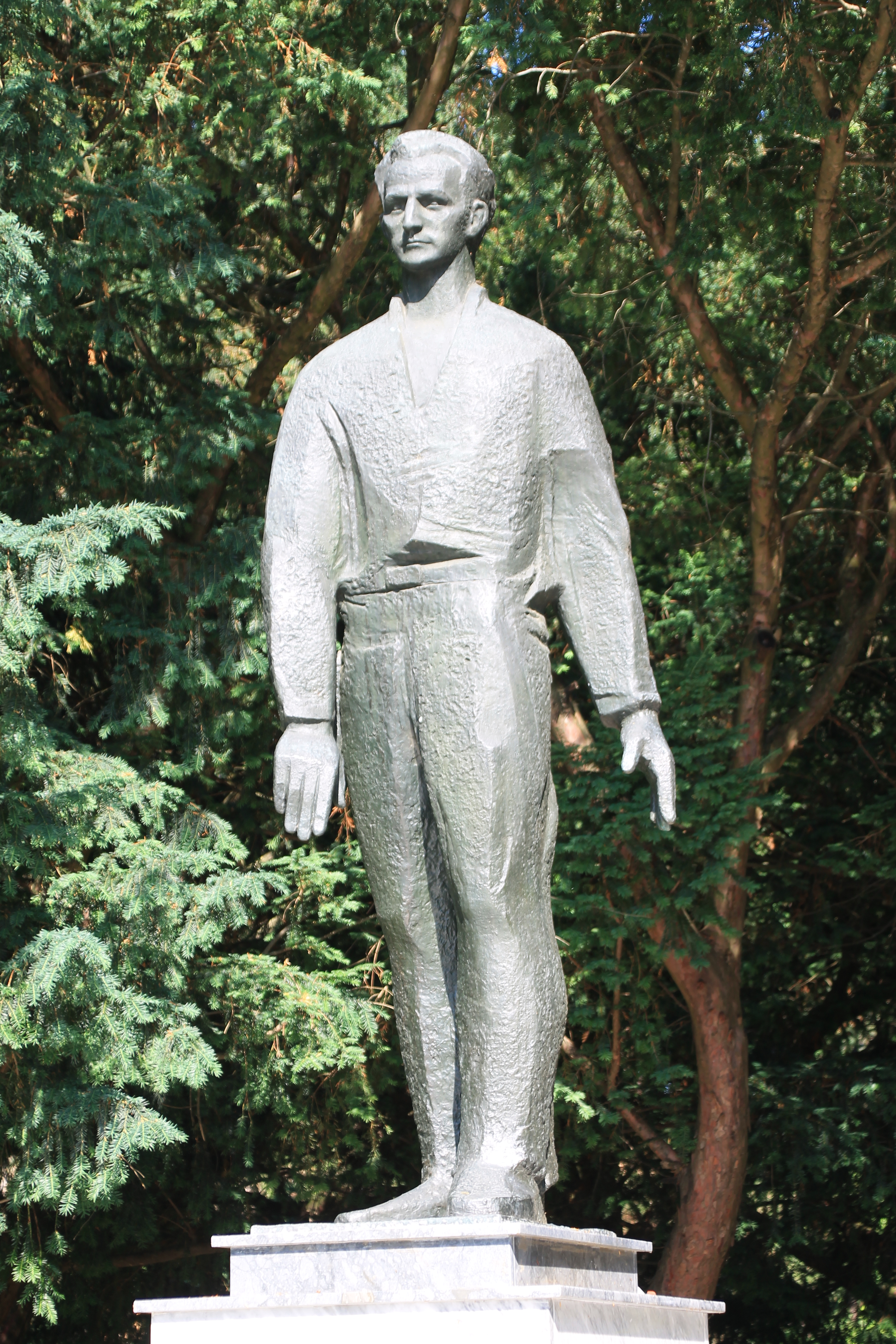
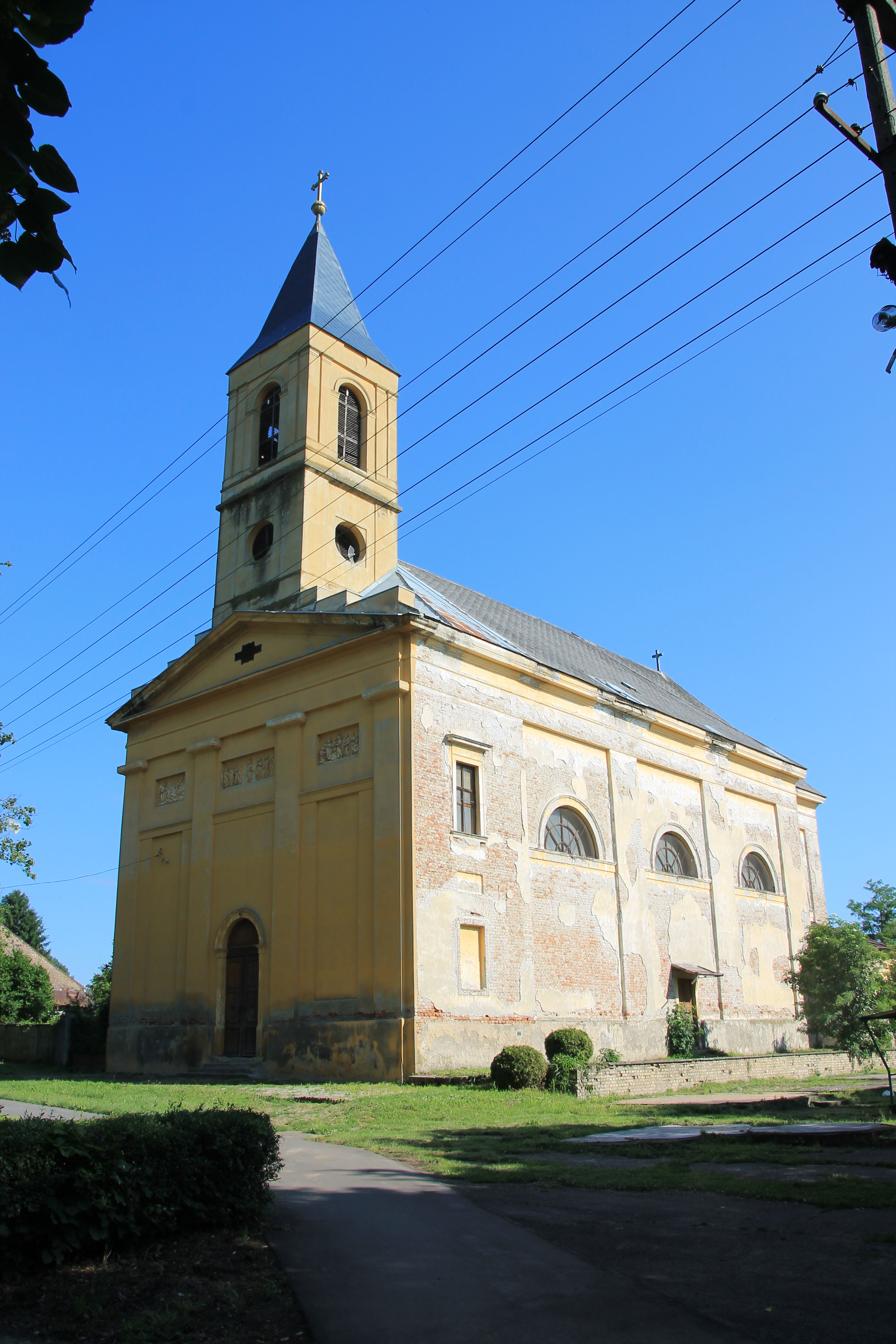
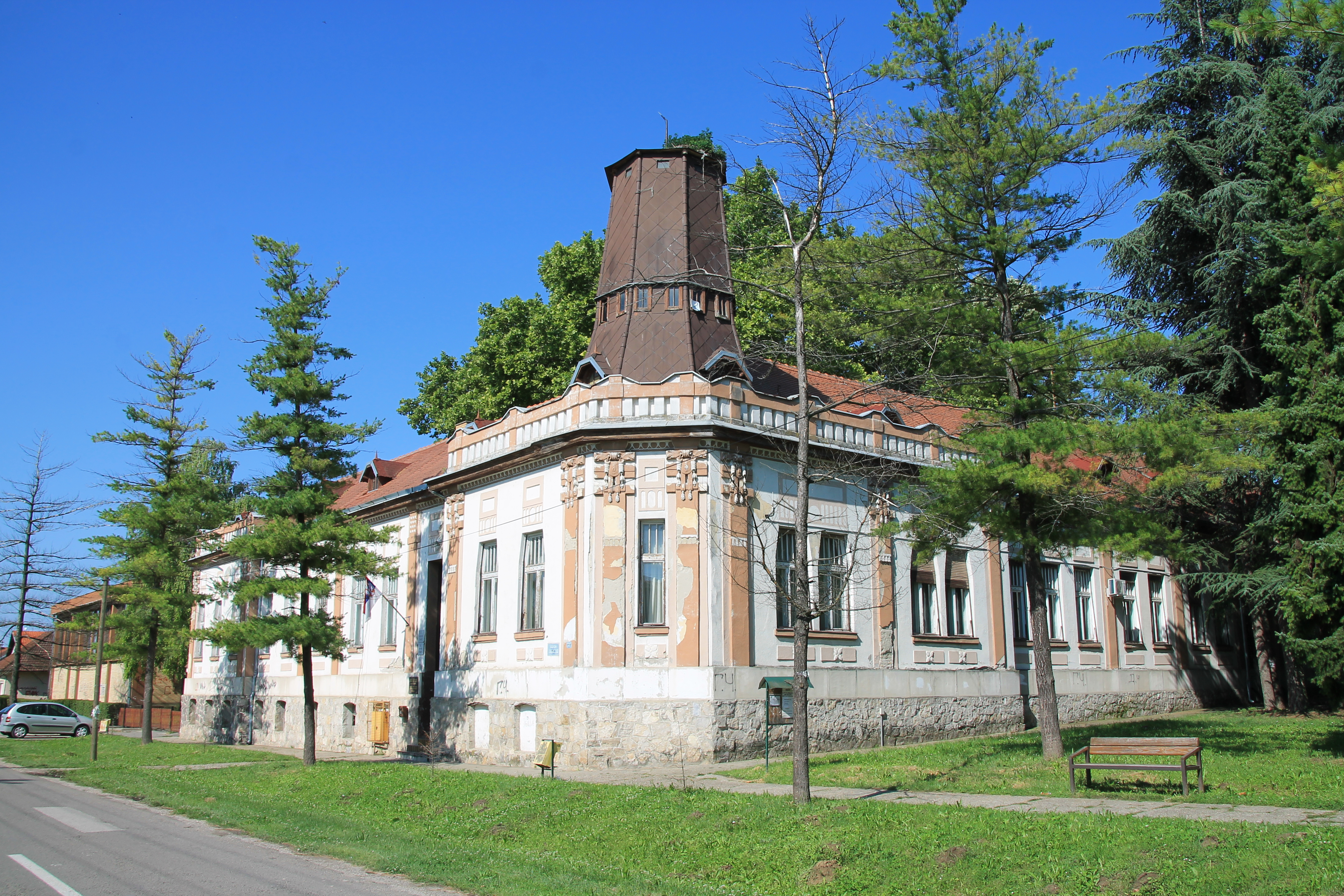
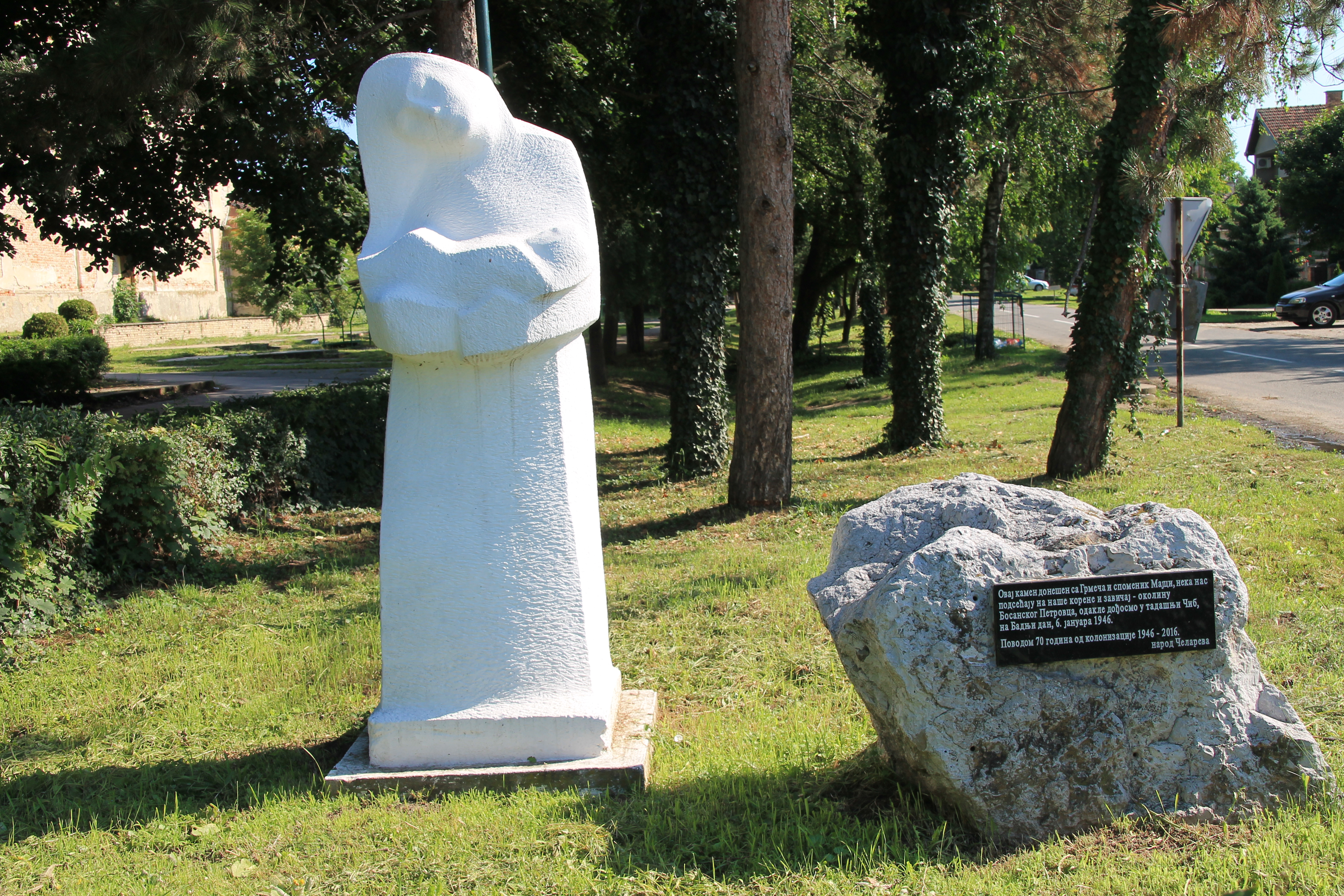
- Čelarevo

- Location within Vojvodina Location within Serbia Location within Europe
- Coordinates: 45°16′N 19°32′E
- Country: Serbia
- Province: Vojvodina
- Region: Bačka (Podunavlje)
- District: South Bačka
- Municipality: Bačka Palanka

Population (2002)
  - Total: 5,423
- Time zone: UTC+1 (CET)
  - Summer (DST): UTC+2 (CEST)

Čelarevo (Serbian Cyrillic: Челарево; Hungarian: Dunacséb) is a village located in the Bačka Palanka municipality, in the South Bačka District of Serbia. It is situated in the Autonomous Province of Vojvodina. The village has a Serb ethnic majority and its population numbers 5,423 people (2002 census).

Prior to 1946, the village was known as Čib (Serbian Cyrillic: Чиб), but was renamed Čelarevo in honour of Partisan commander and National Hero of Yugoslavia Zdravko Čelar (1917-1942).

== Demographics ==
Ethnic groups (2002 census):

- Serbs = 4,396
- Slovaks = 462
- Hungarians = 138
- Yugoslavs = 114
- Croats = 62
- Montenegrins = 22
- Germans = 15
- Ukrainians = 10
- others.

== Historical population ==
- 1961: 3,717
- 1971: 4,073
- 1981: 4,817
- 1991: 5,011

== Sports ==
Local football club ČSK Pivara spent four seasons in the second tier of Serbia and Montenegro.

== Gallery ==
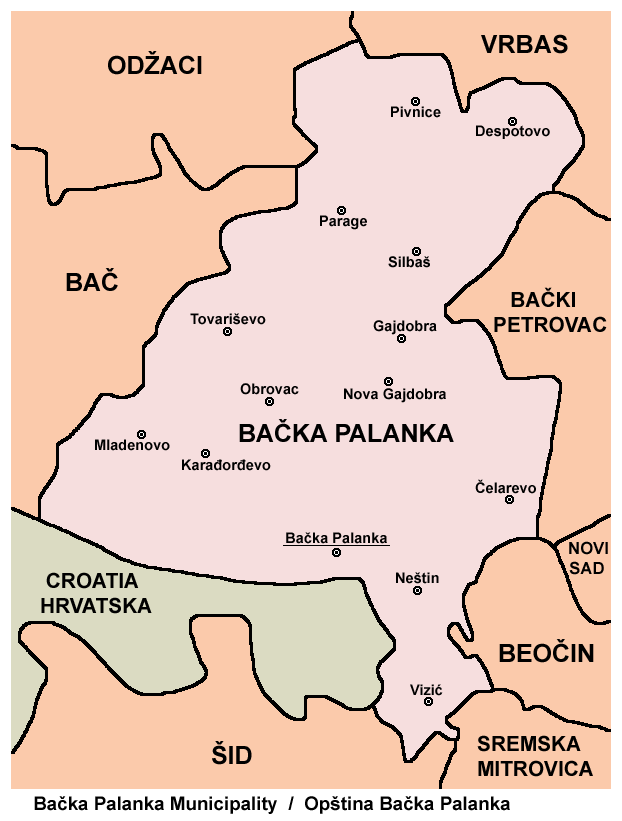
Map of the Bačka Palanka municipality, showing the location of Čelarevo

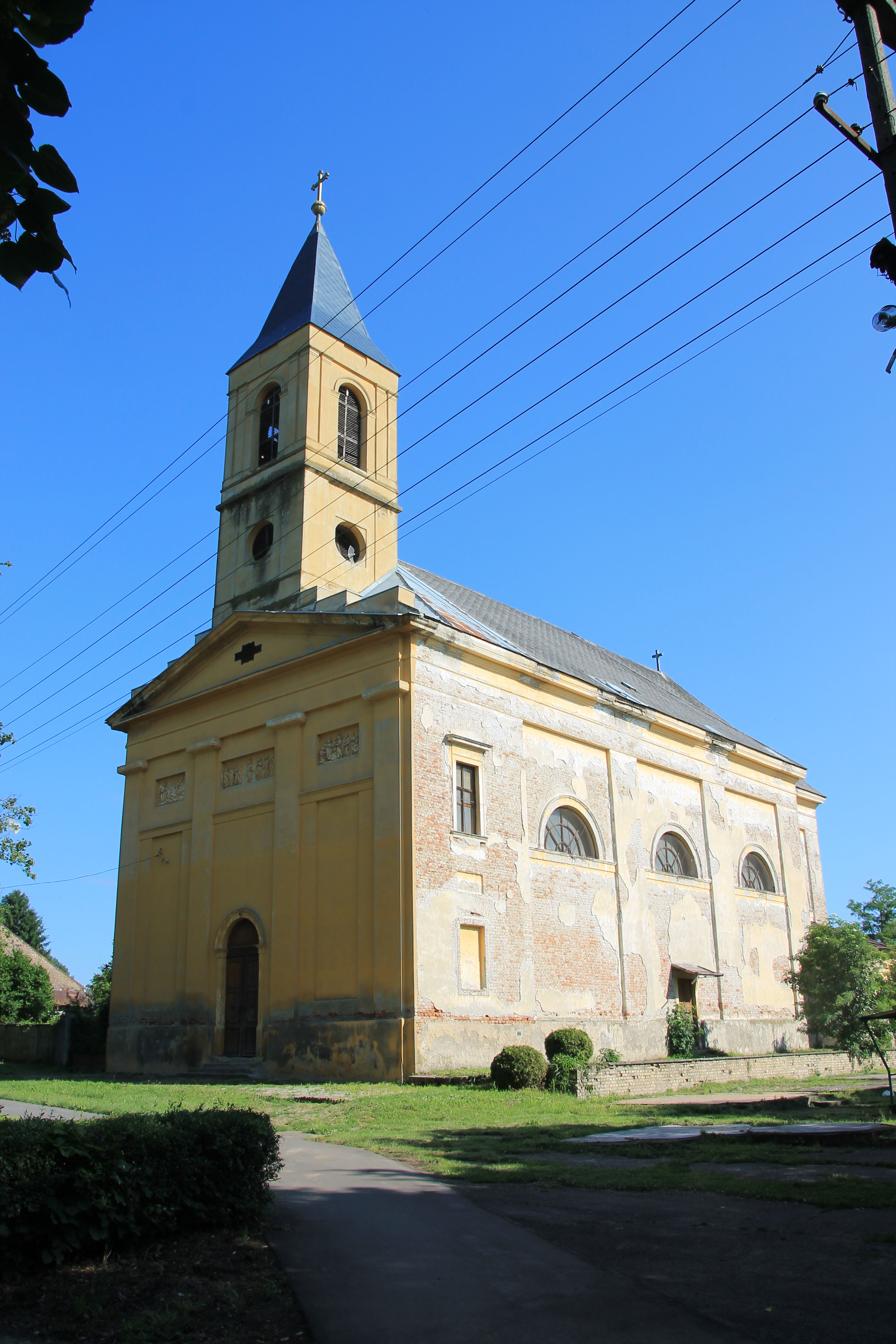
The Roman Catholic Church of the Assumption of Mary

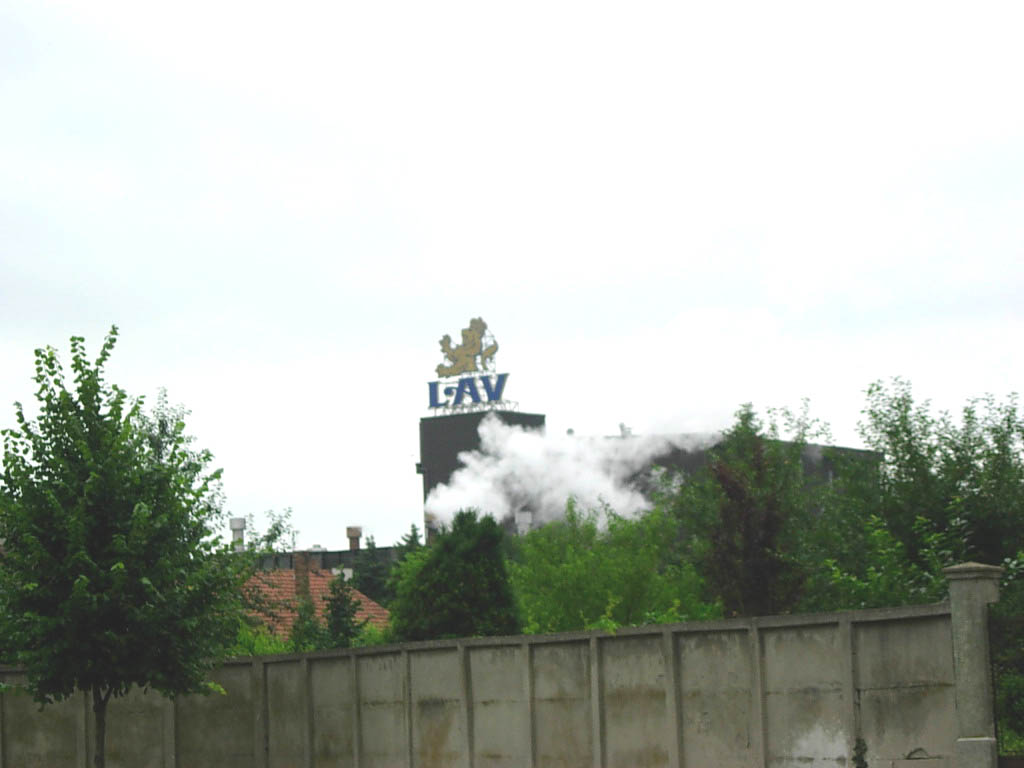
The "Lav" brewery in Čelarevo

== See also ==
- FK Bačka Bačka Palanka
- Lav pivo
- Carlsberg Srbija
- FK ČSK Pivara
- List of places in Serbia
- List of cities, towns and villages in Vojvodina
