= Heineken Srbija =

Serbian brewery based in Zaječar

- Native name: Хајнекен Србија; Hajneken Srbija
- Company type: d.o.o.
- Industry: Beverages
- Founded: 7 July 2007; 18 years ago
- Headquarters: Železnička 2, Zaječar, Serbia
- Area served: Serbia
- Key people: Alexandros Daniilidis (Director)
- Products: Beers, soft drinks, vinegar and yeast
- Revenue: ▲€85.46 million (2017)
- Net income: ▲€9.45 million (2017)
- Total assets: ▲€74.77 million (2017)
- Total equity: ▲€33.66 million (2017)
- Owner: Heineken International (100%)
- Number of employees: 291 (2017)
- Website: www.heinekensrbija.rs
- Footnotes / references Business ID: 20309288; Tax ID: 105093995

Heineken Srbija (Serbian: Хајнекен Србија / Hajneken Srbija) is a Serbian brewery based in Zaječar. It is owned by the Dutch brewing company Heineken International.

== History ==
The Dutch brewing company Heineken International entered the Serbian market in July 2007. Soon after entering the market, it purchased several breweries in Serbia and became one of the largest companies in the Serbian brewing market.

In December 2007, Heineken bought the Serbian brewery Rodić MB for an undisclosed amount. At the time, Rodić MB with 282 employees had a total equity of 145 million euros and annual revenues of 18.5 million euros. With the purchase, Heineken became the third-largest brewing company in Serbia, behind Apatin Brewery and Carlsberg Srbija. After the acquisition, the company changed its name to "Heineken's Braurei MB".

In June 2008, Heineken bought 72% of shares of the Serbian brewing company "Efes Srbija", controlled by the Turkish Efes Pilsen. Efes Srbija had "Zaječar Brewery" and "Pančevo Brewery" in its ownership. Following the acquisition, the company operated under name to "Ujedinjene srpske pivare" (United Breweries of Serbia) and later renamed to "Heineken Srbija".

== Organization ==
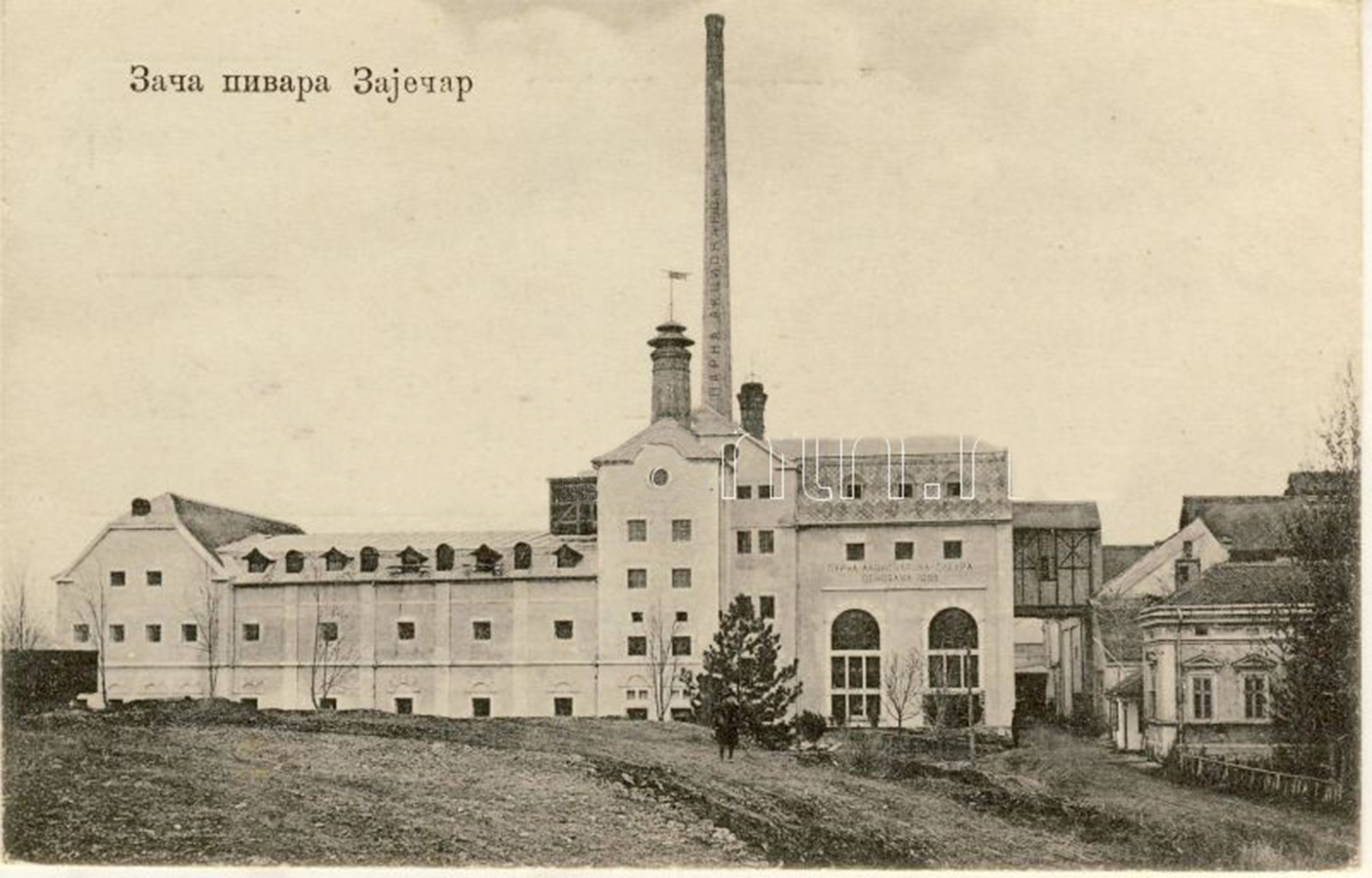
Zaječar Brewery in 1905

- Novi Sad Brewery
- Zaječar Brewery

== Sponsorships ==
Heineken Srbija is the main sponsor of summer music festival EXIT.

== See also ==
- Zaječarsko pivo
