= BIP Brewery =

Breweries of Serbia

Coordinates: 44.7964°N 20.4502°E

BIP 1839 Brewery
- Official logo
- Native name: БИП пивара BIP pivara
- Company type: d.o.o.
- Industry: Beverages
- Founded: 1839; 187 years ago
- Headquarters: Bulevar Vojvode Putnika 5, Belgrade, Serbia
- Products: Beers, soft drinks, vinegar and yeast
- Revenue: ▼€0.70 million (2018)
- Net income: ▲€0.39 million (2018)
- Total assets: ▲€22.84 million (2018)
- Total equity: ▲€5.68 million (2018)

Beogradska industrija piva (abbr. BIP), is a Serbian brewery with headquarters in Belgrade, Serbia. The brewery was founded in 1839, although it has operated under the current name Beogradska industrija Piva (BIP) since January 1963. It declared bankruptcy in September 2015 and transformed its operation in December 2021.

In addition to a range of beers, the brewery produced soft drinks, vinegar, and yeast.

== Predecessors ==
=== Weinhappl-Bajloni brewery (1839) ===
BIP's oldest predecessor was founded in 1839 by the Czech milling expert Johan Weinhappl from Sremska Mitrovica. It was a facility for cooking barley juice. At the time, the brewery was not in the BIP's modern location at the Mostar Interchange, but its exact location is unknown (Vračar, Skadarlija).

After the brewery in Savamala was opened by the royal family, Weinhappl's lost market. Filip Đorđević previously purchased the equipment from Weinhappl's brewery, and founded a new brewery in 1850. He installed it in the ending section of the Cetinjska Street, which forms the atrium with Skadarlija. The manually operated brewery became known as Little Brewery, to distinguish it from the Big Brewery in Savamala. It was purchased by the Bajloni family in 1880, who introduced the steam machines.

It produced "Aleksandar" beer, made from thermal waters that spring out in the brewery's backyard. When Bajloni began digging for the foundations of his brewery in 1892, he discovered the bones of the mammoths and skulls of the Neanderthal Krapina man. The well is located 80 to 300 metres (260 to 980 ft)) under the surface. Under the brewery is a complex of lagums (subterranean galleries or catacombes), which were used as a storage rooms for the beer barrels.

=== Princely (Big) brewery (1840) ===
Architect Hadži-Neimar designed in 1840 an elongated, large, ground floor house, built from hard materials at the corner of modern Balkanska, Gavrila Principa and Admirala Geprata streets. It was called Princely or Great Brewery, or, because it was owned by princess Ljubica Obrenović, Ljubica's Brewery. It also hosted kafana, and alarge yard. The building later hosted the Saint Andrew's Day Assembly in 1858-1859 and served as the temporary theatrical scene from 1857 to 1862 after the demolition of Đumrukana. It was later acquired by the Vajfert family, until the building was demolished in 1935.

=== Vajfert brewery (1873) ===
In the 1870s the area of Smutekovac in Senjak (modern Mostar) was purchased the land from the lawyer Pera Marković by Đorđe Vajfert, and parcelled. As he was a German subject, he couldn't own properties in Serbia. Instead he paid the entire sum to Marković who issued him a receipt. Vajfert then started to build the brewery in 1872, predecessor of the modern BIP Brewery at the same location. As soon as he was granted Serbian citizenship, Vajfert received a deed on the land. He finished the brewery and turned the surrounding estate into an exquisite garden, which hosted many banquets and parties. In 1892, city authorities organized a banquet with Nikola Tesla as the guest of honor.

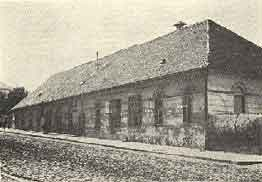
The old Great Brewery in Savamala. Built in 1840, later purchased by the Vajfert family, it was demolished in 1935

The brewery was opened in 1873, under the name of Đorđe Vajfert's First Serbian Steam Brewery. The entire brewery complex was completed in 1880. After it was finished, the entire structure changed the urban character of this part of Belgrade. The brewery itself was designed by foreign architects.

Vajfert studied beer brewing at the College of Agriculture and Brewing near Munich, Bavaria. In 1892–1893, within the complex, Vajfert built a mansion which became known as Vajfert's Villa. The one-storey edifice was designed by engineer Jovan K. Ristić, in the Romantic style. It became known for its interior, richly decorated woodworks, including the central wooden staircase. Close to the villa is the vast network of lagums, or underground corridors. The so-called Vajfert storage cellars, 70 m (230 ft) long and 32 m (105 ft) wide subterranean rooms, were divided into 14 sections where beer was stocked in barrels and tanks. The villa became one of the most distinguished venues in Belgrade, hosting numerous balls and receptions. The surrounding neighborhood was occasionally referred to as Vajfertovac.

Vajfert's beer won golden medals at 1889 Paris World Fair, and 1900 Paris World Fair, where Bajloni won silver.

Becoming one of the greatest industrialists in the Kingdom of Yugoslavia, Vajfert owned the brewery until his death in 1937. It was then inherited by his nephew Fernand Gamberg. The factory was damaged in both World Wars.

== BIP brewery (1963) ==
After the Communist takeover in 1945, it was nationalized and repaired as the 7th of July factory, while Bajloni became the Belgrade Brewery. They merged in 1950 under the name 7 July. On 23 January 1963, it merged into the Belgrade Beer Industry (BIP), with Bezalko company. The brewery was modernized and expanded, while the only surviving part of the original complex was Vajfert's Villa.

The brewery in Skadarlija was declared a cultural monument in 1967, and was operational until 1989. The spring water was bottled for drinking until the early 2000s. By 2008, the entire inner complex is abandoned and slated for demolition. However, as the project of massive reconstruction failed, the brewery became home for many coffeehouses and clubs.

The malting section became operational in 1965 and was the only brewery in Serbia which produced malt. The brewery's golden age was in the 1970s. By the middle of the decade, the factory was brewing 1.5 million hectoliters per year, covering over one quarter of the market in all of Yugoslavia. It invested in the most modern equipment, including the Siemens control board which at that time only existed in NASA. After the collapse of the federal state in the early 1990s, the situation in the company worsened. It was especially hard-hit after a major fire in the factory in 1997.

== Privatization ==
=== Failed attempts ===
Public bidding for the sale of the company in 2004 failed. In another attempt, in July 2007, the factory was sold to the Swedish-Lithuanian consortium. The consortium consisted of United Nordic Beverages AB and Alita for €26.5 million, for 52% of the factory. In February 2010, the privatization was terminated due to non-fulfillment of investment obligations. The clauses included not investing the additional €5.1 million, not buying off the rest of the shares and not paying taxes. The consortium also administered the properties contrary to the contract: they sold the offshoot factories in the neighborhood of Krnjača and the town of Čačak and even pawned the company's brand for a credit of €1.1 million without consulting the administrative board. In October 2012, the Privatization Agency of Serbia announced that it had won the case against the former owners, meaning they would have to pay €17 million in the name of compensation.

The malting section was repaired and became operational again. In 2014, the products of the factory were beer (80%), kvass (10%), soft drinks (5%) and vinegar (5%). Still, the brewery entered bankruptcy proceedings in September 2015, and officially went bankrupt in the early 2016.

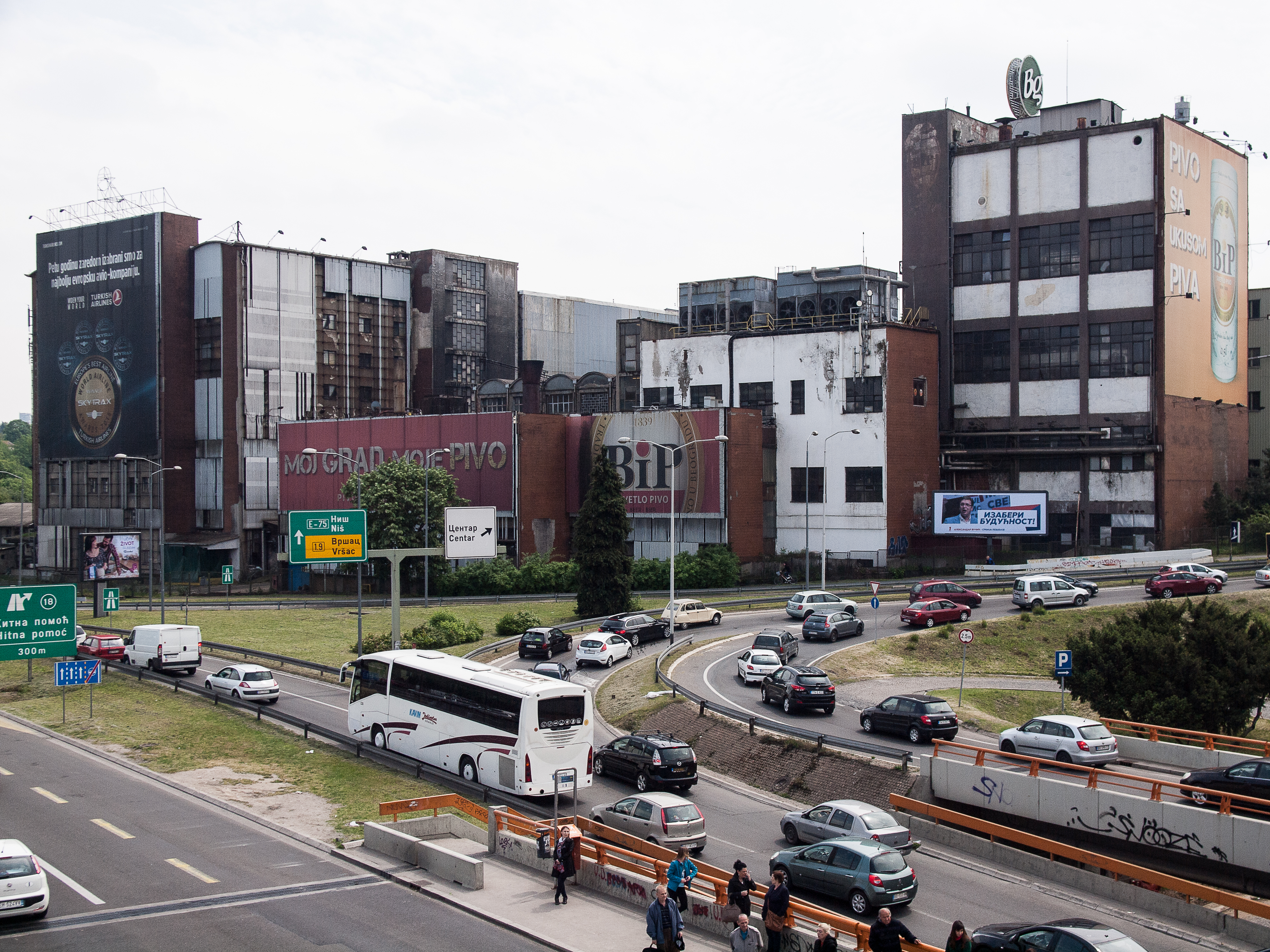
The BIP brewery complex at Mostar Interchange in 2016

In April 2017, a Macedonian investor leased the brewery for the annual price of €900,000. Svetozar Janevski, owner of the company M6 EDEN SRB which leased the factory, and who also owns the Tikveš vinery and the Skopsko beer brewery (both in North Macedonia), announced that the old brewery would be operational for the next two to three years until the new brewery is built in another location. He announced negotiations with the government to reach an agreement on the new location. The new investor claimed that he was not interested in just taking the highly valuable land on an excellent location, but that he wanted to revitalize the beer production. However, in early 2019 the city announced a new urban regulatory plan for the area where the brewery is, envisioning the conversion of the land from "economic" to "commercial". On 1 July 2019, Janevski broke the lease, claiming the "concept" of BIP has no future. In 2017, the brewery had a total loss of 51.5 million dinars (€435,000). The Ministry of Economy stated that the brewery would not be shut down; instead, the state made a public offer for a new lease. The process failed as no one made an offer by 15 July 2019, but production continued under the bankruptcy manager.

By this time part of the complex became dilapidated and was taken out of use, reducing the factory's capacity. The lagums had not been inspected in a long time while the terrain of the complex is prone to mass wasting. In 2009, a partial supporting wall was built to prevent the soil from moving while the unbuilt part of the complex became covered in overgrowth. In November 2019 the city published the detailed regulatory plan for the area, the work of urbanists Radmila Grubišić and Milica Andrejić. It anticipates the complete demolition of the entire complex and construction of the commercial neighborhood with hotels, business offices and malls. The only surviving part of the former complex will again be Vajfert's Villa, which was placed under preliminary protection. Minimal beer production in some of the new areas may be preserved for tourism purposes.

One of the pre-war inheritors, the Veljković family, threatened to sue the state because the factory was not returned to them in the process of restitution. In February 2020, director of the Restitution Agency, Strahinja Sekulić, said that they decided not to return the factory as natural restitution, but instead to financially compensate the shareholders (including the Veljkovićs), as the brewery was a joint-stock company when nationalized.

On 14 March 2020, an ammonia leakage was reported from the brewery. White ammonia smoke covered the area, and 18 people were hospitalized.

=== Selling and future ===
In July 2021, the brewery was offered for sale once more, for an estimated worth of 4.17 billion dinars, or €35.5 million. Offered assets include the factory complex at Mostar (26,700 square metres (287,000 sq ft)), a juice factory, the brewery in Čačak, commercial offices in Obrenovac, Kosovska Mitrovica and Alibunar, a retail store in Kragujevac, and an apartment in Budva, Montenegro. In August 2021 the company was sold to the only bidder, a consortium consisting of DL Holding from Hamburg, Germany, and the Serbian company Auto Čačak, for half of the originally offered price (2.09 billion dinars or €17.8 million). The new owners announced that the brewery complex at Mostar will be turned into the "most modern business park in Europe", while the rest of the company "will be further developed".

The sale sparked further controversies. Members of the Veljković family continued to claim that the restitution process was not finished and that company was sold illegally. Bogdan Veljković described the entire sale process as "criminal, lawless, corruption", claiming the entire worth of BIP was €300 million. Small shareholders were also dissatisfied, especially with the low price, claiming the company's bankruptcy was forced. Investment expert Mahmut Bušatlija said that the sale was probably done for the sake of building the shopping mall on the brewery location. The company Auto Čačak also participated in many other deals with the state, selling or leasing thousands of passenger vehicles to state organs and companies, including the police (over 700 cars) and the city of Belgrade.
