= Skopsko beer =

Macedonian beer

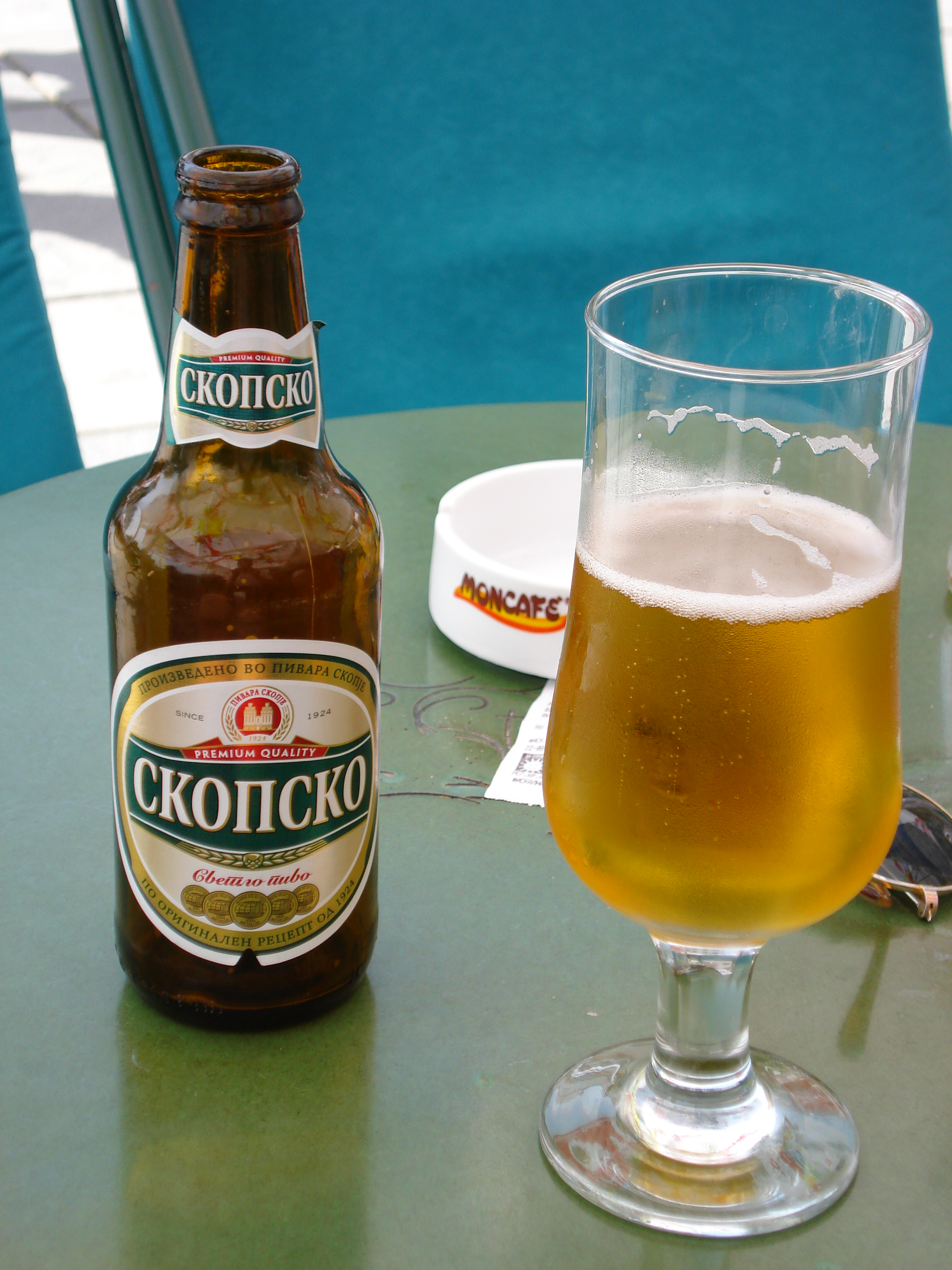

Skopsko (Macedonian: Скопско) is the most popular beer in North Macedonia. It has 64% of the market in North Macedonia. It was the first commercial beer, the best-known and best-selling beer brand in the country. Once a "Best of Macedonia" has become "Our Best" and "Skopsko, and everything is possible" – are its most famous slogans.

== History ==
The Skopje brewery was founded in 1922 and began operations in 1924. In 1998, it was purchased by the Greek Coca-Cola Bottling Company and Heineken.

Skopsko was introduced with the name "Light Beer" and it presented beer liner with 10% extract. Before World War II, the name of the beer was changed to "An Export Beer from Skopje" ("Скопљанско Експортно Пиво") with increased extract of 12%. By the early 1990s the name "Skopsko" was placed in the center of the label.

- 1991—Skopsko was rebranded.
- 1996—Brewery Skopje was added to the label
- 1999—new label
- 2004—new label
- 2005—new packaging
- December 2014—production of dark beer started

Special Edition of Skopsko Beer featuring 2026 Galičnik Wedding Festival. The text at the bottom: СПЕЦИЈАЛНО НАТОЧЕНО ЗА ГАЛИЧКА СВАДБА (Specially brewed/bottled for the Galičnik Wedding). The picture on the can is the traditional Majik Teškoto dance

== Ingredients ==
The basic ingredients of this beer are water, a starch source, such as malted barley, able to be saccharified (converted to sugars) then fermented (converted into alcohol and carbon dioxide). The beer has a golden yellow color and a white foam. The characteristic bitter taste comes from hops.
