= Zaječarsko pivo =

Serbian beer

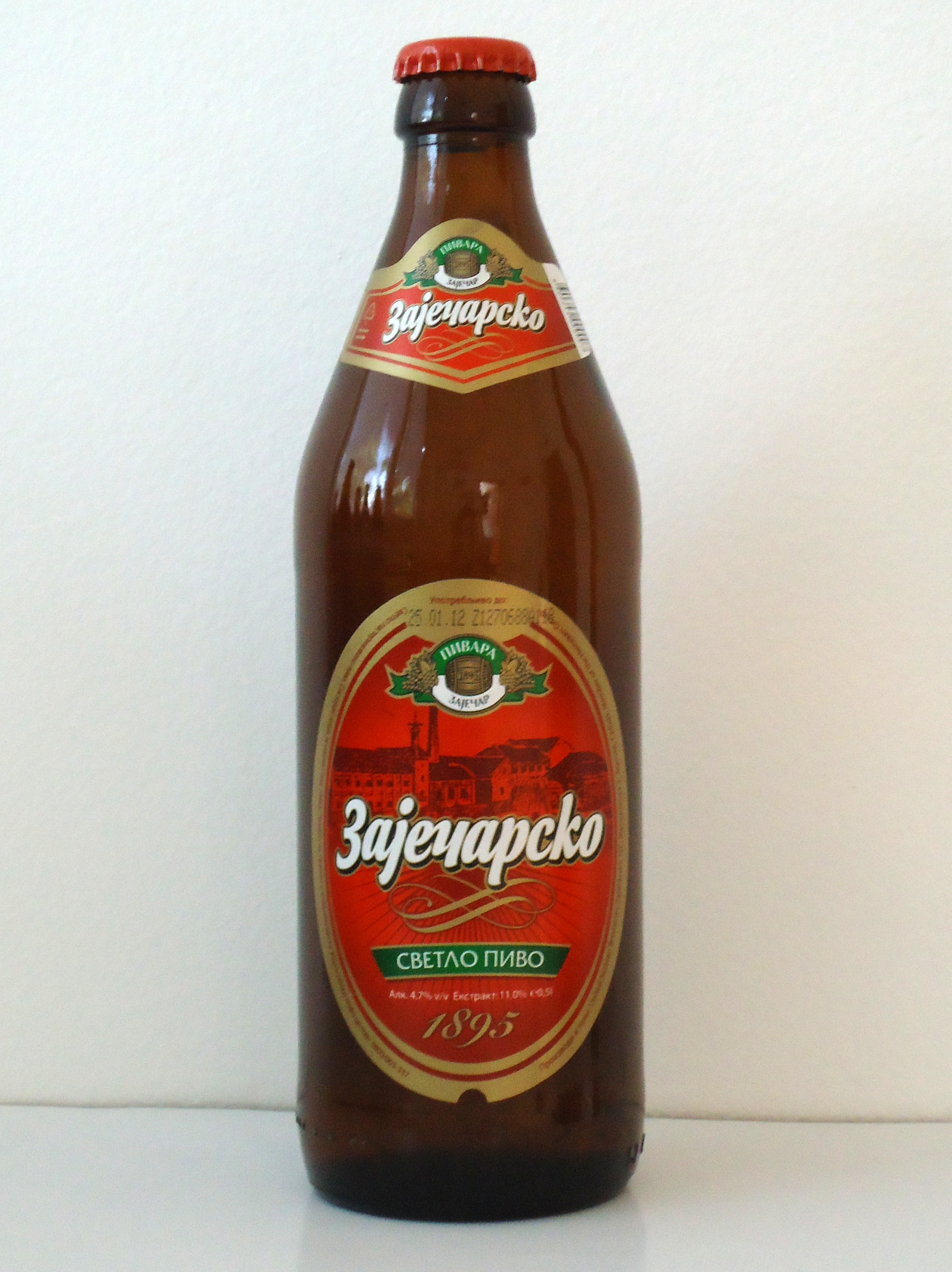
- Industry: Alcoholic beverage
- Founded: 1895
- Products: Beer
- Owner: Heineken Srbija

Zaječarsko pivo (Serbian Cyrillic: Зајечарско пиво) is a type of beer which comes in two forms, light and low-pasteurized. It is produced in Zaječar Brewery owned by Heineken Srbija.

== Production process ==
Production process of Zaječarsko light beer: The basic raw materials used in the brewing process are barley, hops, water and yeast. Barley is the main raw material for beer production. Hops are responsible for the bitter taste and serve to balance the sweet taste of beer. Water used for the production process in Zaječar is completely natural and chemically untreated. Yeast is responsible for obtaining the final taste and aroma of beer. The production process consists of four main phases:

- Mashing (mixing the milled malt with water). Managing the process is done by highly automated equipment, given recipe has to be strictly applied as a prerequisite for obtaining high-quality beer.
- Fermentation and aging – At this stage, the beer gets important sensory and organoleptic properties (taste, aroma, pungency).
- Filtration – technological operation of separation of the smallest particles from beer and achieving crystal clarity.
- Bottling

== Packaging ==
Zaječarsko is bottled and packed in five different packages. There is light beer in 0.5 L glass returnable packaging, 0.33 L glass non-refundable bottle, 0.5 L can, 2 liter plastic packaging and 30-liter keg. Low-pasteurized beer is packed in glass returnable bottle of 0.5 L.

== See also ==
- Beer in Serbia
