= Staropramen Brewery =

Czech beer trademark

Pivovary Staropramen

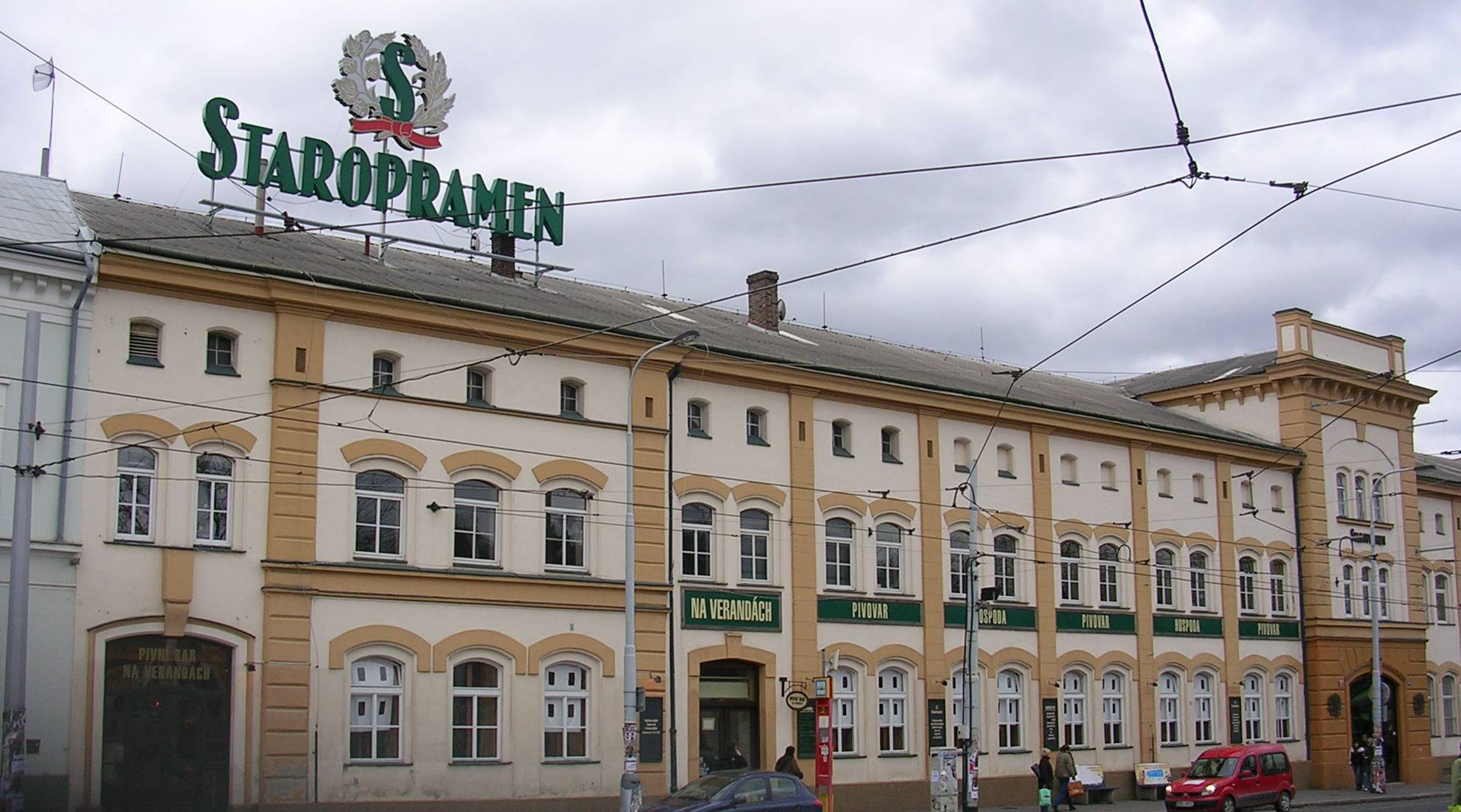
- Staropramen Brewery
- Interactive map of Pivovary Staropramen
- Location: Prague, Smíchov, Czech Republic
- Coordinates: 50°4′6.8″N 14°24′23.9″E
- Opened: 1869
- Owner: Molson Coors
- Website: pivovary-staropramen.cz

Staropramen beer logo

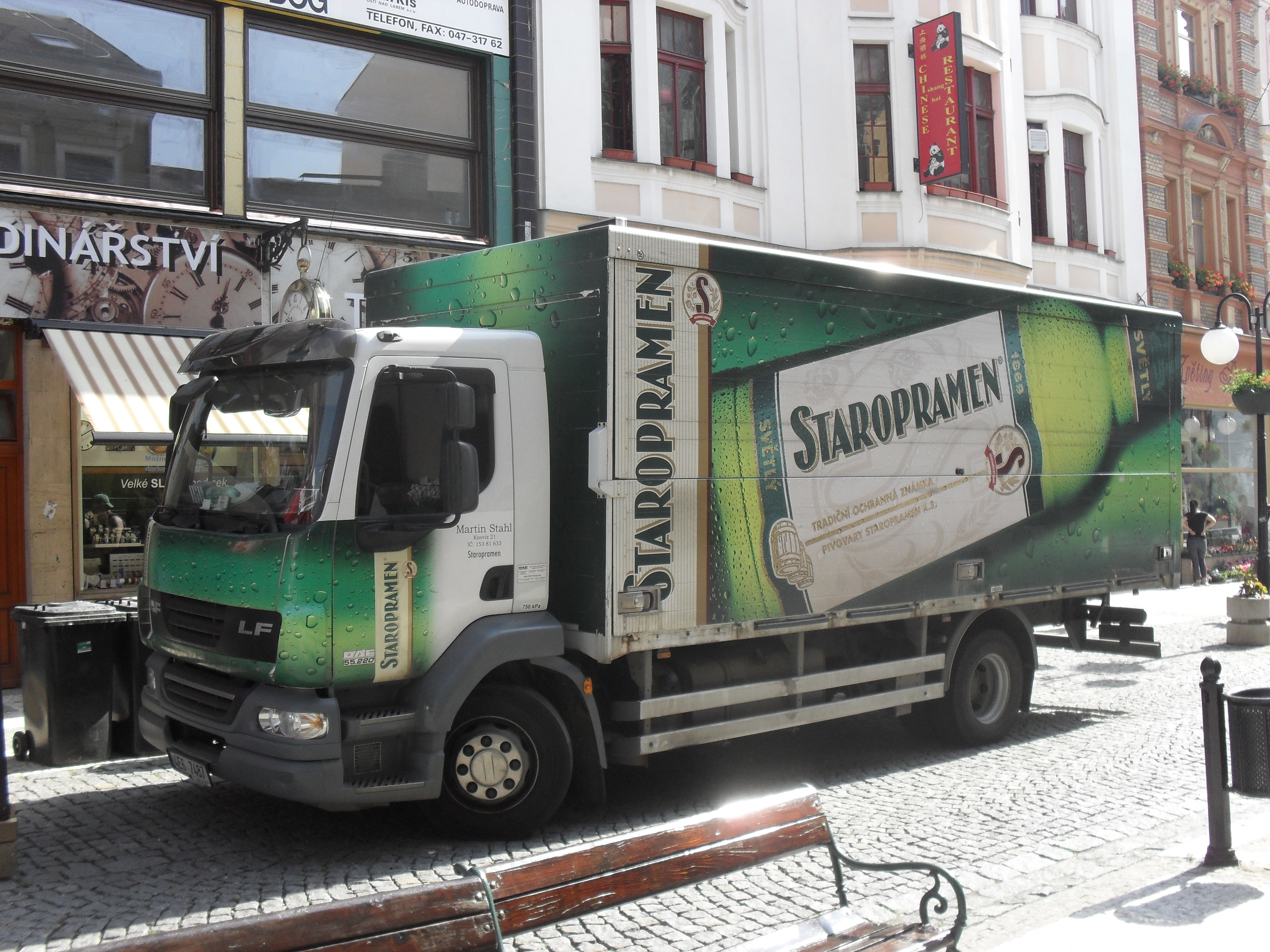
Staropramen truck

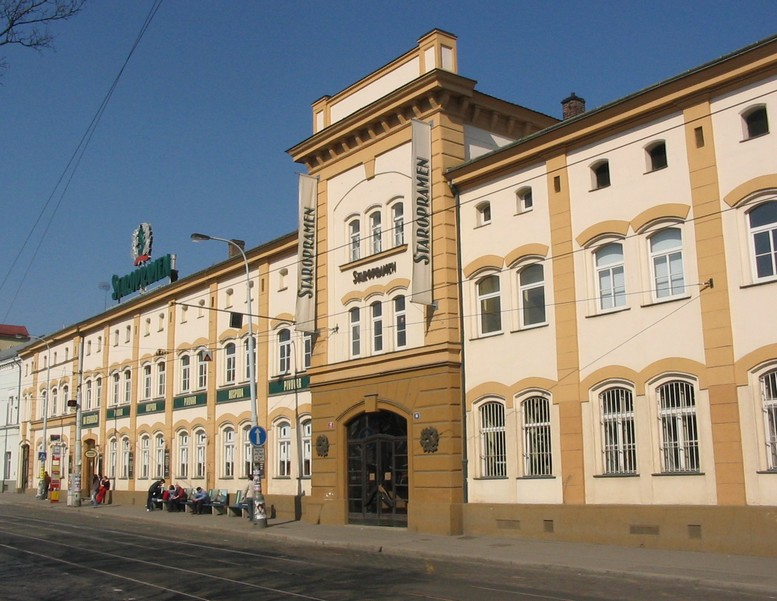
The Staropramen Brewery, at Nádražní 84, Prague

Staropramen Brewery (Pivovary Staropramen s.r.o.) in the Smíchov district of Prague is the second largest brewery in the Czech Republic. It was founded in 1869 and the brand name Staropramen, literally meaning "old spring", was registered in 1911. It is owned by Molson Coors and its products are exported to 37 countries, mostly in Europe and North America.

== History ==
Staropramen Brewery's history begins in 1869 when shares for a "Joint Stock Brewery in Smíchov" were offered for sale. The brewery building was completed and beer first brewed in 1871. The Ostravar Brewery opened in 1898 followed a year later by the Braník brewery; these two breweries would later merge with Staropramen.

Due to competition from other Prague breweries, the brand name Staropramen, which translates as "old spring" (water source), was registered in 1911. After the First World War, all three breweries saw a period of sustained growth, and by the 1930s, Staropramen was the largest brewery in Czechoslovakia. Under communist rule after the Second World War, all Czechoslovak breweries were nationalised, including Staropramen. After communism ended in 1989, the brewery, along with the Braník and Měšťan breweries, became in 1992 part of the Prague Breweries group (Pražské Pivovary), which by 1996 came under control of the Bass company. Bass brought Ostravar into the group in 1997, then in 2000 sold its brewing operations to Interbrew, which merged with AmBev in 2004 to form Inbev. Staropramen saw steady growth; in 2008, it was the Czech Republic's second largest beer producer with a 15.3% share of the domestic market.

In mid-October 2009, private equity fund CVC Capital Partners bought all of Anheuser–Busch InBev's holdings in Central Europe (including Staropramen) for €2.23 billion. They renamed the operations StarBev. In April 2012, Molson Coors bought StarBev.

In May 2023, it was announced that English actor Orlando Bloom is the new brand ambassador for Staropramen beer.

== Products ==
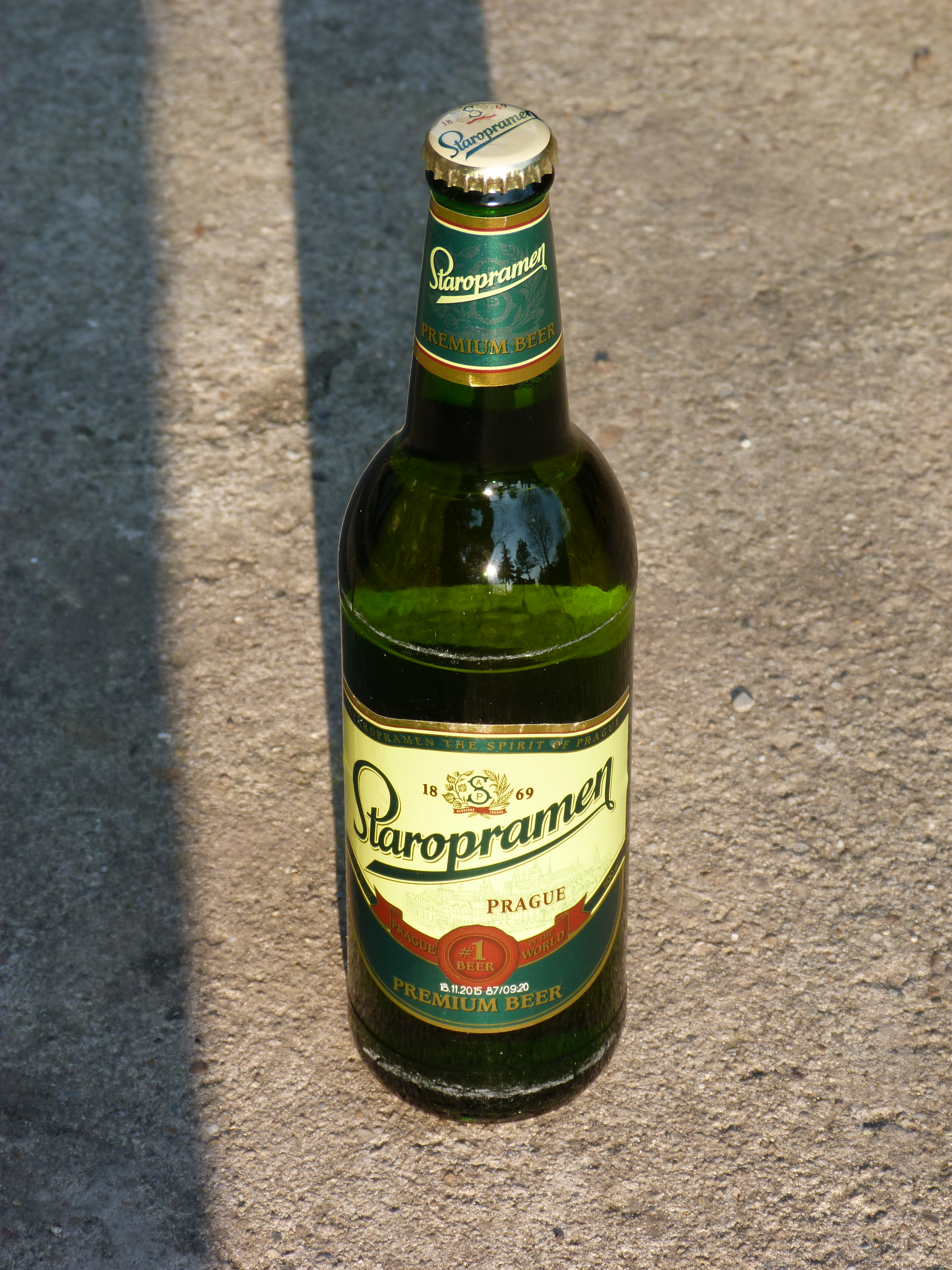
Staropramen Premium

- Staropramen Smíchov – a pale draught beer with 4.0% ABV (in Czech: 10° or Výčepní).
- Staropramen Jedenáctka – pale lager, contains 4.7% ABV (in Czech: 11° or Ležák).
- Staropramen Ležák (Premium) – pale lager and flagship of the brand, contains 5.0% ABV (in Czech: 12° or Ležák).
- Staropramen Černý – a dark beer with 4.4% ABV (in Czech: Tmavé).
- Staropramen Nefiltr Pšeničný – an unfiltered wheat pale lager with 5.0% ABV (in Czech: Nefiltrované).
- Staropramen Nealko – a low-alcohol beer with max. 0.5% ABV (in Czech: Nealkoholické).
- Staropramen Extra Chmelená – an extra bitter pale lager, contains 5.2% ABV.
- Staropramen Déčko – pale beer with reduced sugar content (dia), and 4.0% ABV.
- Staropramen Granát – a semi-dark lager with 4,8% ABV.

The company also produces beers under the Ostravar, Braník and Velvet brands. Staropramen beers are also produced under licence in several other European countries, including Serbia (Apatin Brewery), Croatia (Zagreb Brewery), Romania (Bergenbier), United Kingdom (MCBC (UK) Ltd., Burton-on-Trent) and Georgia (JSC Lomisi).

== See also ==
- Beer in the Czech Republic
