= Jelen (beer) =

Serbian beer brand

Jelen Beer
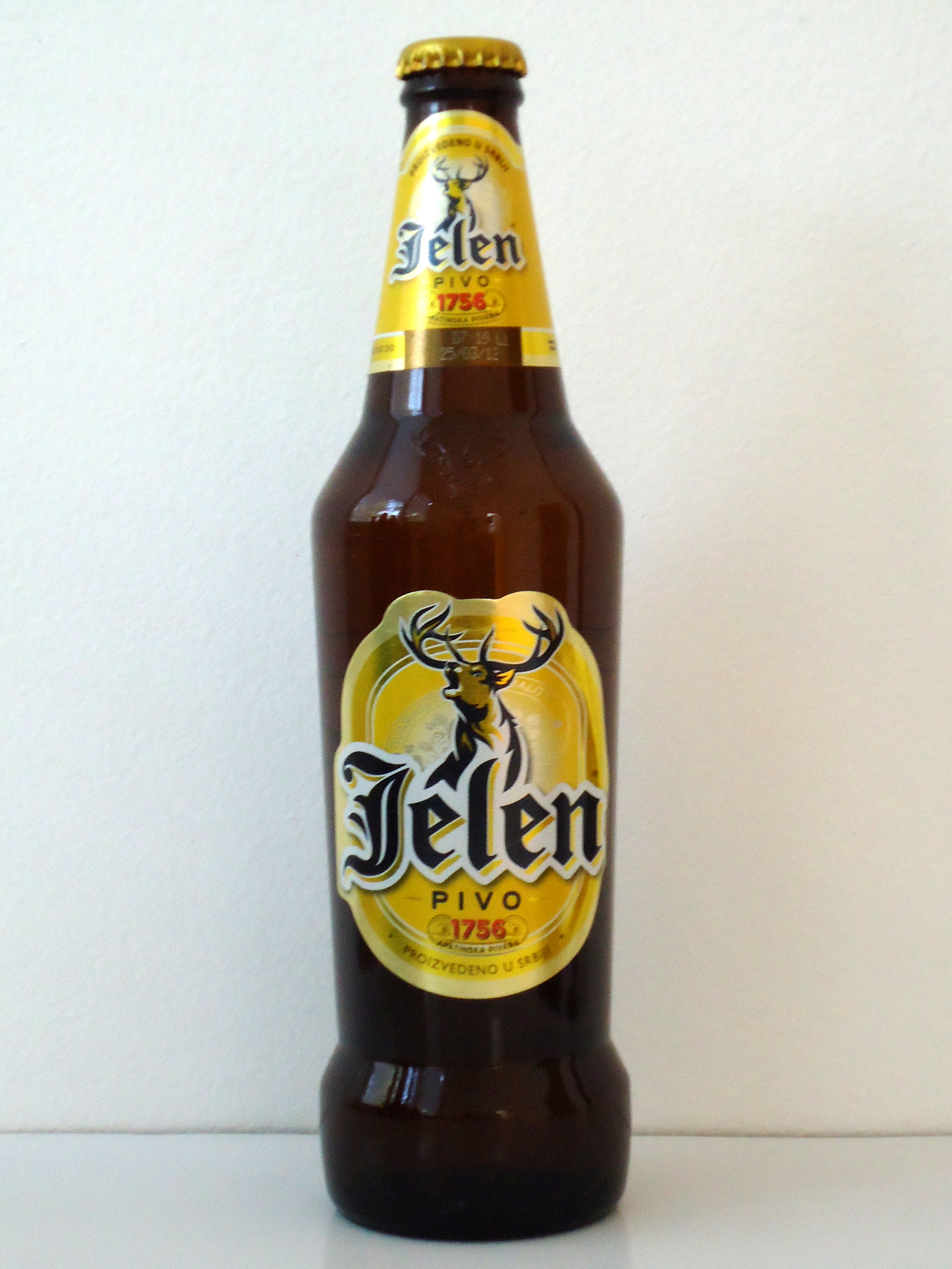
- Industry: Alcoholic beverage
- Founded: 1756
- Products: Beer
- Owner: Molson Coors
- Website: Company website

Jelen beer (Serbian: Jelen pivo, pronounced [jělen pîːʋo]) is a pale lager produced by the Apatin Brewery in northwest Serbia that belongs to American-Canadian concern Molson Coors. It contains 4,6% alcohol and belongs to the class of light lagers. Jelen has won various awards within Serbia and participates in a variety of sponsorships. Its logo is a bugling red deer; jelen means deer.

== Brands ==
- Jelen pivo
- Jelen Cool company's light non-alcoholic beer.
- Jelen Fresh Lemon beer with only 2% of alcohol mixed with lemon juice.
- Jelen Fresh Grapefruit beer mixed with grapefruit juice

== Awards ==
- Monde Selection 2010 – Big golden medal (for the 12th time) and golden medal for quality (for the 3rd time)
- Most Popular Product with Men – the result of the poll conducted by Moja Srbija (My Serbia) Citizens’ Association in 2009
- Best beer of the Beer Fest – by votes of audience for the 6th time since 2004
- The Best Beer Brand from Serbia 2010 in the beverage category in a campaign conducted by the Ministry of Trade and Services, Serbian Chamber of Commerce and business daily Privredni Pregled.
- Most Popular Beer in Serbia –the result of the poll conducted by Moja Srbija (My Serbia) Citizens’ Association in 2010

== Sponsorship ==
Since 2008, Jelen has been the general sponsor of the Guča Trumpet Festival and owner of the Jelen Top 10, one of the national pop-rock TV shows. It is the organizer of the Jelen Live Festival.

== See also ==
- Beer in Serbia
