= Carlsberg Srbija =

Serbian beer brewery

Coordinates: 45.2739°N 19.5204°E

- Official logo

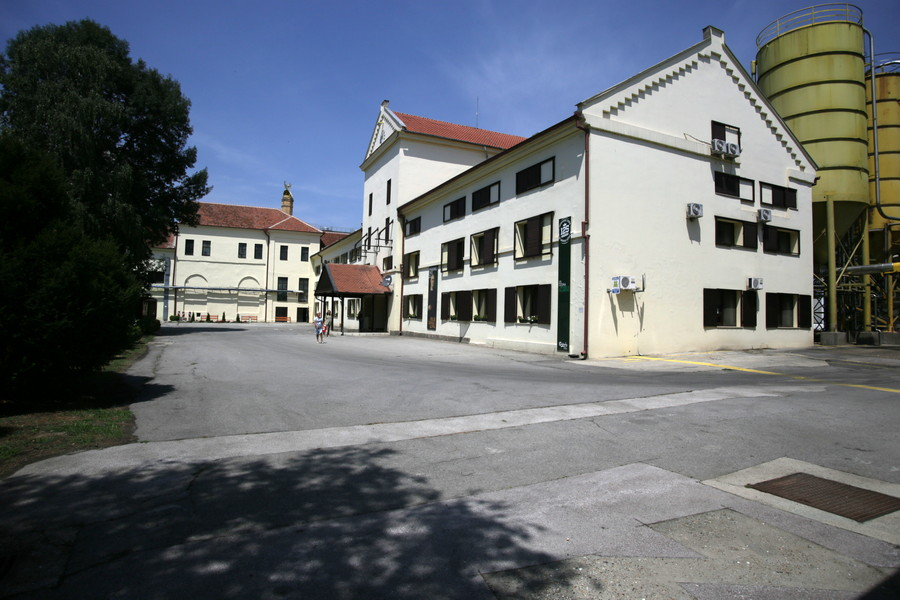
- Carlsberg Srbija in Čelarevo
- Native name: Карлсберг Србија; Karlsberg Srbija
- Type: d.o.o.
- Industry: Alcoholic beverage
- Founded: 31 December 1998; 27 years ago (Current form); First founded in 1892
- Founder: Lazar Dunđerski
- Headquarters: Proleterska 17, Čelarevo, Serbia
- Area served: Serbia, Montenegro, Bosnia and Herzegovina
- Key people: Gabor Bekefi (Director)
- Products: Beers, soft drinks, vinegar and yeast
- Production output: 1.7 million hl
- Revenue: ▲€83.58 million (2017)
- Net income: ▲ (€2.49 million) (2017)
- Total assets: ▼€70.22 million (2017)
- Total equity: ▼€45.19 million (2017)
- Owner: Baltic Beverages Holding (99.99%)
- Number of employees: 555 (2017)
- Parent: Carlsberg South East Europe
- Subsidiaries: Carlsberg BH; Carlsberg Montenegro
- Website: www.carlsbergsrbija.rs
- Footnotes; Business ID: 08684928; Tax ID: 100495907

Carlsberg Srbija (full legal name: Carlsberg Srbija d.o.o. Čelarevo) is a Serbian beer brewery, based in Bačka Palanka. It is majority owned by Danish Carlsberg Group since 2003 and it has around 550 employees.

It is well known by its signature brand Lav pivo. As of 2012, Carlsberg Srbija holds 28.4% of Serbian beer market, placing it second, behind market leader Apatinska pivara.

The Belgrade-based Carlsberg South East Europe regional group oversees Carlsberg's operations in the Balkans (other than Čelarevo facility, Carlsberg owns several more breweries in Bulgaria, Croatia, and Romania). In addition to its market presence in Serbia, Carlsberg Srbija exports its signature brand on the markets of Montenegro and Bosnia and Herzegovina.

== History ==
Čelarevo Brewery (Serbian: Pivara Čelarevo) was founded in 1892 by landowner Lazar Dunđerski. The beer it produced was called ČIB from the founding of the brewery till 1980, after the prior name of the place. Its capacity back then was about 10,000 hl a year. The brewery had its own malthouse as well, which stopped working in 1973 when first commercial malt house appeared. Until privatization, the brewery was a part of an agricultural property, therefore it was always able to provide necessary ingredients. It possessed its own hop fields covering around 100ha, where four kinds of hop were cultivated.

Significant technological development of the brewery started in the 1970s when new Steinecker fermentation hall was purchased, the capacity of which was 400,000 hl a year. It was not until 1978 that the first cylindrical conical fermentors in former Yugoslavia, made by stainless steel, were installed in open space. Two years later, a hall for two lines of filling beer into bottles was built, as well as a modern cooling system, installation for taking and filling of carbon-dioxide, line for pouring beer into barrels, new power unit, installation for chemical preparation and disinfection of water. In the 1980s, new line for fruit juices started working.

In 1992 a more updated, automated Steinecker fermentation hall was built in. Power unit was reconstructed, gas was introduced, Japanese compressors for ammonium cooling were purchased. Eight new fermentors made in Italy started work in 1996 which are cooled by direct vaporization of ammonium, which was the first time in Yugoslavia, and which rationalizes the expenditure of cooling energy. The four new ones were installed in 1998, and eight more in 2000. New, modern line for filling beer in glass bottles was installed in 2003.

Čelarevo Brewery has been under the patronage of Carlsberg Group owning 52 percent from September 2003, and from September 2004 the ownership has become 99.96 percent. Since then, one of the major investments in production has been purchasing of modern PET line of a renowned German producer Krones, which started working in June 2004. This increases the capacity for producing larger number of brands as well as the capacity of the brewery. In 2006. new can line was installed in Brewery producing and filling can beer for Carlsberg South East Europe region.

The company Carlsberg Srbija achieved the growth rate of 70 percent in 2005, which represented the largest growth rate in Serbia. Carlsberg Srbija is the first brewery to introduce on the Serbian market an internationally renowned brand of beer made in Serbia - Tuborg Green.

== Brands ==
Domestic brands produced in Čelarevo Brewery are: Lav, Lav Premium, Merak, Twist Radler. Čelarevo Brewery also produces brands as:Tuborg Green, Carlsberg, Somersby, Kronenbourg 1664 Blanc and Holsten. Lav is the second leading beer brand on the Serbian market, and has its share in the regional countries.

== Activities ==
In 2006, Carlsberg Srbija became the first brewery in Serbia, and also the first brewery within Carlsberg Group to obtain the ISO9001 and ISO22000 international certificates awarded by the Lloyd's Register Group.

In 2007, the company announced it started the production and bottling of Holsten pilsener at its facilities.

According to the 2007 press release by Carlsberg Srbija CEO, the Carlsberg Group already invested €110 million in its Serbian operation since 2004, and has further plans to invest €15 million in order to expand its facilities that would allow it to increase its annual production to 2 million hl by 2008.

In 2008, the company announced the start of bottling and production of a new brand Tuborg Lemon.

In 2008, the company opened the Beer Museum in Čelarevo.

Its promotional activities in Serbia are sizable. Since 2004, the company is the main sponsor of Serbia national team, which it uses to promote its Lav brand.

== Market data ==
In 2003, when Carlsberg Group took the company, it had a 23% of market share. As of 2012, Carslberg Srbija increased its market share to 28.4%.
