= Apatin Brewery =

Brewery in Serbia

- Official logo
- Native name: Апатинска пивара Apatinska pivara
- Type: d.o.o.
- Industry: Beverages
- Founded: 5 October 1991; 35 years ago (Current form); First founded 23 September 1756
- Headquarters: Trg Oslobođenja 5, Apatin, Serbia
- Area served: Serbia, Montenegro, Bosnia and Herzegovina
- Key people: Dragan Radivojević (Director)
- Products: Beers, soft drinks, vinegar and yeast
- Production output: 4.5 million hl
- Revenue: ▲€87.79 million (2017)
- Net income: ▼€6.05 million (2017)
- Total assets: ▲€121.38 million (2017)
- Total equity: ▲€83.24 million (2017)
- Owner: Molson Coors (100%)
- Number of employees: 719 (2017)
- Parent: Molson Coors Central Europe
- Website: www.jelenpivo.com
- Footnotes; Business ID: 08045577; Tax ID: 100962933

Apatin Brewery (Serbian: Apatinska pivara), a member of the Molson Coors Europe, is a Serbian brewery based in Apatin. It is majority owned by the American company Molson Coors. The brewery's products are exported worldwide. Outside of Serbia, the beer is sold in Bosnia-Herzegovina, Croatia, Macedonia, Montenegro, Austria, Sweden, Slovenia and Switzerland.

== History ==
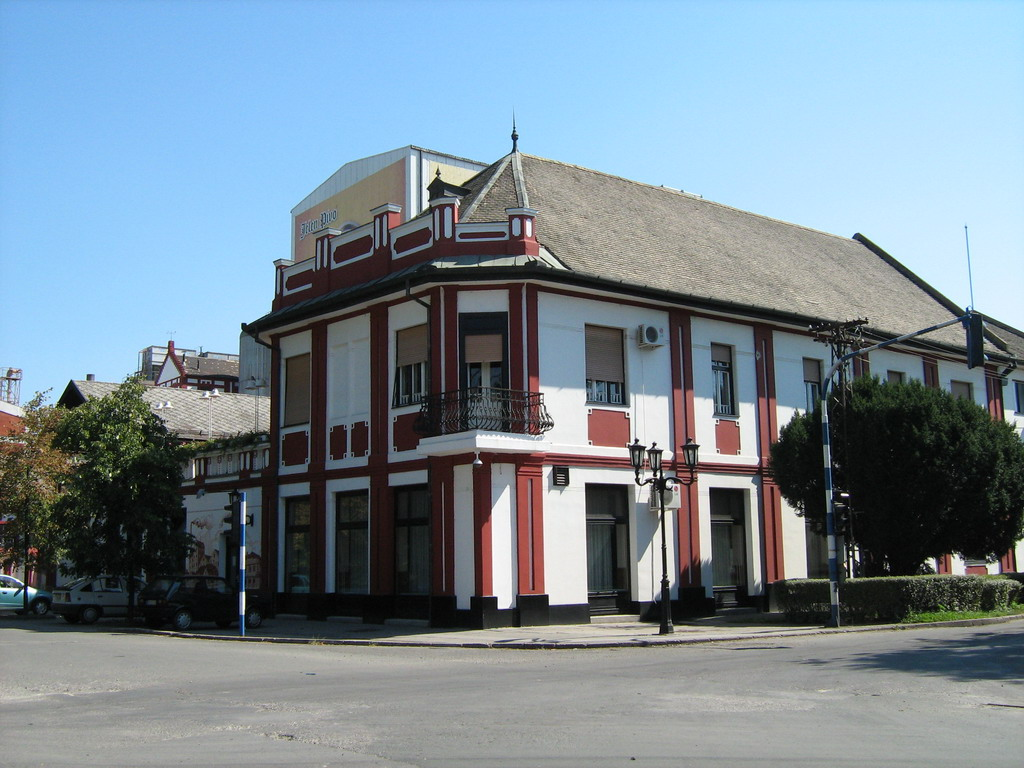
The Apatin Brewery building.

It was founded in 1756 as Imperial Brewery owned by the Imperial Chamber. It is one of the oldest breweries in Serbia. The production of 12,000 hectoliters of beer was recorded in the 18th century. The brewery was transferred to private ownership for the first time at the end of the 19th century. Major investments were characteristic of that phase, with a primary goal of modernizing the brewing process and enlarging production capacities. In the period prior to World War I, the yearly production of beer was 16,000 hectoliters.

The brewery went through hard times in 1930s, which ultimately led to the disruption of production in 1935. Nine years later, after the liberation of Belgrade in World War II and reparation of the old equipment, a new phase of the company began. By 1950, more than 40,000 hectoliters of beer were produced. Continuous investments resulted in the reconstruction and modernization of the production facilities and the application of new technologies in the production process and the increase in the beer production capacities. All this was conducted in the period 1958–1966 and it represented a basis for further development of the brewery and transformation into large company.

In the 1970s, the process of automated production lines was introduced, the result of which was production over 630,000 hectoliters of beer in 1977, as well as the introduction of new non-alcoholic beverages tasting of orange, lemon, blueberry and Alpine herbs. The result of the economic sanctions in the 1990s was a brief period of decrease in the brewery production, so that 475,000 hectoliters of beer was produced yearly.

The company began transferring into the private ownership in 1991, and in 2003 it became a part of the international InterBrew network which merged in 2005 in InBev corporation. Over three years, InBew invested around 100 million euros in technology of the company. In 2008, the company became a part of Anheuser-Busch InBev. In December 2009, Apatin Brewery became a part of the StarBev regional brewery group based in Prague, founded by a leading investment company CVC Capital Partners. Except Serbia, the group operated on the markets of Bosnia and Herzegovina, Bulgaria, Croatia, Czech Republic, Hungary, Montenegro, Romania and Slovakia.

On 3 April 2012, Molson Coors brewing company has completed its previously announced acquisition of StarBev for approximately €2.65 billion. This way, Molson Coors took over the regional brewing group Starbev, as part of which Apatin Brewery in Serbia has been operating.

As of 2006, it is the leading brewery on the Serbian market.

== Brands ==
Brands produced in Apatin Brewery are: Jelen, Apatinsko, Jelen Cool, Jelen Fresh, Staropramen, Beck's, Stella Artois, Nikšićko pivo and Nikšićko tamno. Jelen is the leading beer brand on the Serbian market, and has its share in Bosnia and Herzegovina, Montenegro and Macedonia.

== Marketing ==
Apatin Brewery is known for its slogans for each of its brands: Jelen Pivo – "Men know why"; Jelen Cool – "Anytime, anywhere"; Nikšićko Pivo – "Always among friends"; Beck’s – "Deliberately different". According to the results of a 2009 study of TNS Medium Gallup, Apatin Brewery ranked third in Serbia in advertising and overall business results.

Apatin Brewery is the sponsor of the Guča Trumpet Festival.
