= Pomona Jr./Sr. High School =

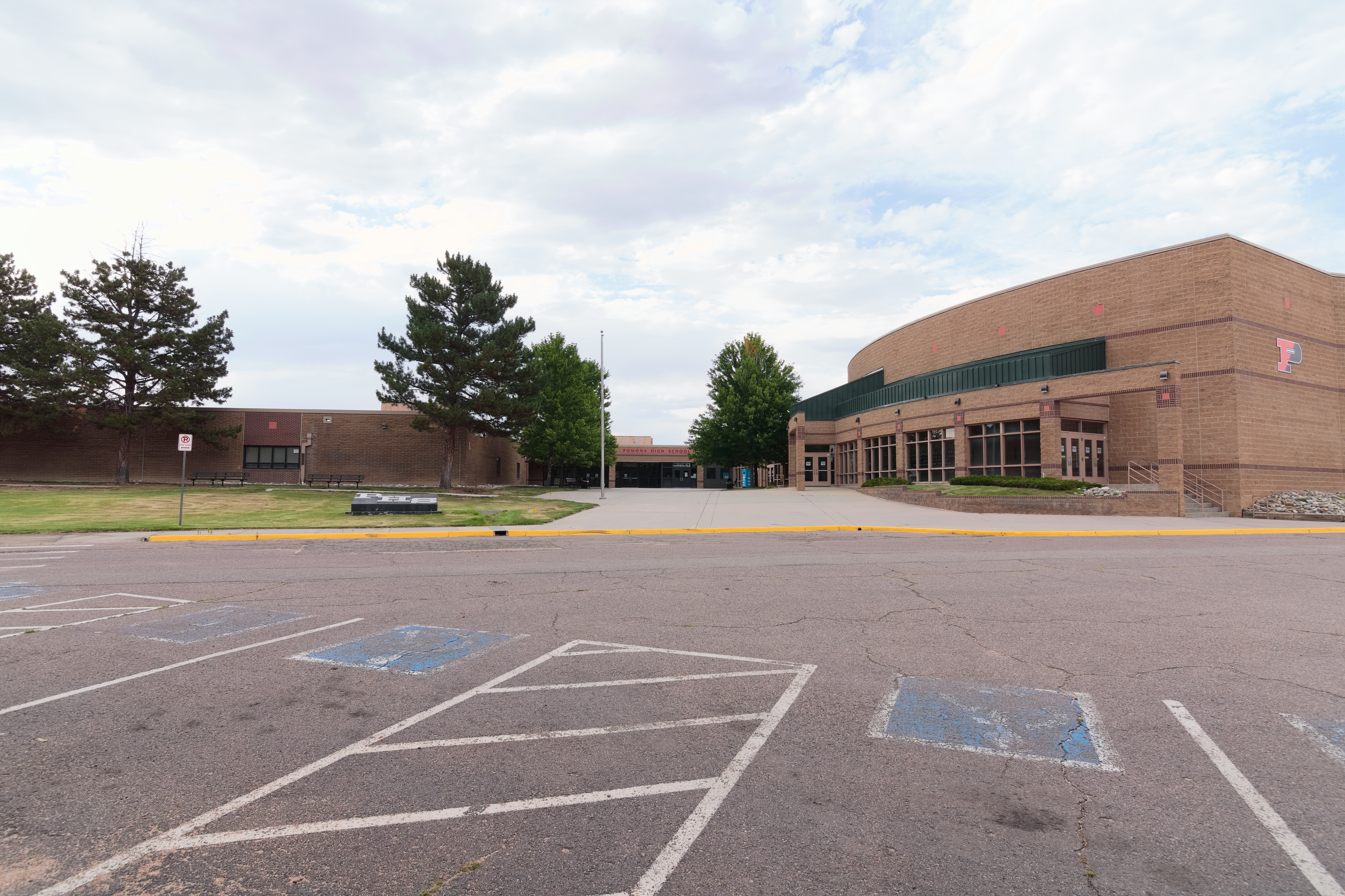

Location
- 8101 West Pomona Drive; Arvada, Colorado 80005; United States; 39°50′58″N 105°5′18″W

Information
- Former name: Pomona High School
- School type: Public secondary school
- Established: 1974; 52 years ago
- School district: Jefferson County R-1
- CEEB code: 060058
- NCES School ID: 080480000775
- Principal: Patrick Rock
- Teaching staff: 71.18 (on an FTE basis)
- Grades: 6–12
- Gender: Coeducational
- Enrollment: 1,252 (2024–2025 (Note: These figures are for the 2023–24 school year and only contain data for Pomona High School and not Moore Middle School.))
- Student to teacher ratio: 17.59
- Campus type: Suburban, Large
- Colors: Black, silver, and scarlet
- Athletics conference: Jeffco
- Mascot: Panther
- Newspaper: Pantera
- Feeder schools: Little Elementary School; Warder Elementary School; Weber Elementary School
- Website: pomona.jeffcopublicschools.org

Pomona Jr./Sr. High School is a public secondary school operated by Jefferson County School District R-1 in Arvada, Colorado, United States.

== History ==
Pomona High School was built in 1973. Located in Arvada, and a part of the Jefferson County Public School district, the school has also been said to be named for the area which was once named the Pomona Ranch. The original farm house for the Pomona Ranch was located at the current spot of McDonald's at the corner of 80th Avenue and Wadsworth Boulevard

The building went through a reconstruction, adding a two-story section in 1994 and 1995, which currently houses the Social Studies and World Language departments. At present, the only part of the school that has remained in the same spot is the gym, although the floor and bleachers were redone in 2008.

In 2015, Dr. Tom Bindel, chemistry teacher at the school, was named Colorado's Outstanding High School Physical Science Teacher by the Colorado Association of Science Teachers.

Pomona's most successful interscholastic sport is wrestling, where they have won ten 5A state championships. Following the longtime success of coach Tom Beeson, who retired in 2002, current coach Sam Federico won four straight 5A titles between 2019 and 2022. The 2022 squad broke the all-time record for most points in the state championship tournament when they scored 256.5 points.

In the 2009–10 academic year the football team took second place in the 5A state championship game, losing to Mullen High School. The team finished the season with a 12–2 record. In 2017–18 academic year the football team took first place in the 5A state championship game.

In 2010, the Catwalk Theatre Company's production of The Servant of Two Masters was presented at the 46th Annual Colorado State Thespian Conference.

In 2024, the school district merged the high school with Moore Middle School amid declining enrollment in both schools. The district moved sixth, seventh, and eighth grade classes to the Pomona High School building, and renamed the school to Pomona Jr./Sr. High School.

== Students ==
Demographics (2020):

- White: 56%
- Hispanic: 36%
- Two or more races: 4%
- Asian: 2%
- Native American: 1%
- Black: 1%

== Student activities ==
=== Athletics ===
State championships:

- Baseball: 2003 (5A)
- Golf: Jakob Green (1985), Grant Olinger (2014)
- Wrestling: 2000 (5A), 2001 (5A), 2013 (5A), 2016 (5A), 2017 (5A), 2019 (5A), 2020 (5A), 2021 (5A), 2022 (5A), 2023 (5A)
- Football: 1988 (4A), 2017 (5A), 2025 (3A)
- Girls' gymnastics: 2015 (5A), 2016 (5A), 2017 (5A) 2018 (5A) 2019 (5A)
- Boys' track: 2016 (5A)

Varsity sports:

- Football
- Baseball
- Soccer
- Wrestling
- Basketball
- Tennis
- Golf
- Swimming
- Cross country
- Track
- Softball (for women only)
- Gymnastics (for women only)
- Volleyball (for women only)

=== Arts ===
The Pomona Band offers three concert bands, marching band, two jazz ensembles, winter guard, winter percussion ensemble and orchestra. The marching band has won 11 marching band state championships in class 5A from 1994 through 2005, appeared in the Tournament of Roses Parade in 1996 and 2005, and placed 5th in the 1996 BOA National Championships. The band also placed 11th in the 1997 BOA National Championships, and 14th in the 2003 BOA National Championships.

The Pomona Winter Guard and Percussion Ensemble were the 2004 Winter Guard International World Finalist. The Winter Guard took first place at the 1994 and 1999 WGI national competitions. The Winter Percussion ensemble took third place at the 1999 WGI competition in Open Class and second place in the 2000 Open Class Competition. The Pomona Symphonic Band was a 2000, 2003 and 2006 Colorado Music Educator's Association (CMEA) Honor Band.

In the 2021–2022 school year, the Pomona music program faced major budget cuts, causing the bands, orchestras and choirs to be condensed into one class each. Pomona now only offers band, orchestra, choir, and after school pep band for football and basketball games.

== Notable alumni ==
- Patrick Cain, football player
- Max Borghi, football player in the XFL
- Kali Fajardo-Anstine, Author
- Taylor Marie Hill, model
- Joel Klatt, Fox Sports Network analyst and host
- Nick Stabile, actor who appeared on Saints and Sinners
- Eme Ikwuakor, Class of 2002, actor
- Cory Blaser, Umpire Major League Baseball
- Brian Schneider, NFL Coordinator
- Keith Villa, Brewmaster and Founder of Blue Moon Brewing Company and Ceria Brewing Company
