= Shock Top =

Belgian-Style Witbeer

- Location: St. Louis, Missouri, United States
- Opened: 2006; 20 years ago
- Owner: Tilray

Active beers
Name	Type
Belgian White	Witbeer
Zest	Light Witbeer

Seasonal beers
Name	Type
Lemon Shandy	Shandy
Ruby Fresh	Grapefruit Witbeer
Citrus Pearl	Finger lime Witbeer
Sunset Orange	Orange Witbeer
Inner Beauty	Jamaican tangelo Witbeer

Other beers
Name	Type
Wheat IPA	IPA-Witbeer hybrid
Honey Bourbon Cask Wheat	Oak aged Honey Witbeer
Twisted Pretzel Wheat	Pretzel Witbeer

Inactive beers
Name	Type
Honeycrisp Apple Wheat	Apple Witbeer
Raspberry Wheat	Raspberry Witbeer
Holy Citrus	Buddha's hand Witbeer

Shock Top is an American, Belgian-Style, spiced witbier brand introduced as a seasonal beer by Anheuser-Busch in February 2006, however, the beer's popularity quickly grew and was used as a rival to Molson Coors' Blue Moon. The brand entered a decline following a failed rebranding effort in 2017 and, citing financial shortfall in part due to the 2023 Bud Light boycott, Anheuser-Busch sold the brand to Tilray in August 2023.

== History ==
=== Founding ===
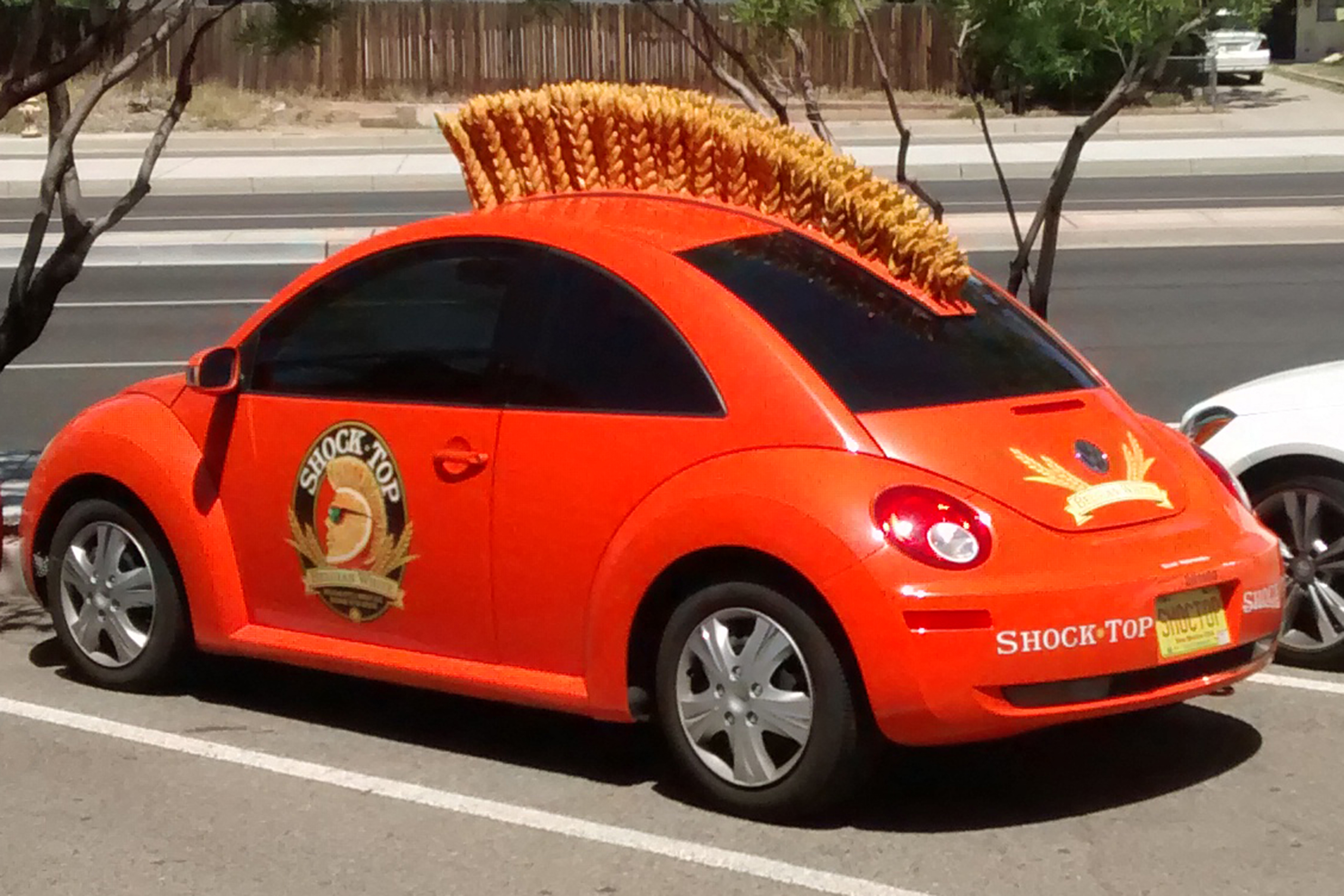
A Shock Top themed Volkswagen Beetle with the pre-2017 logo

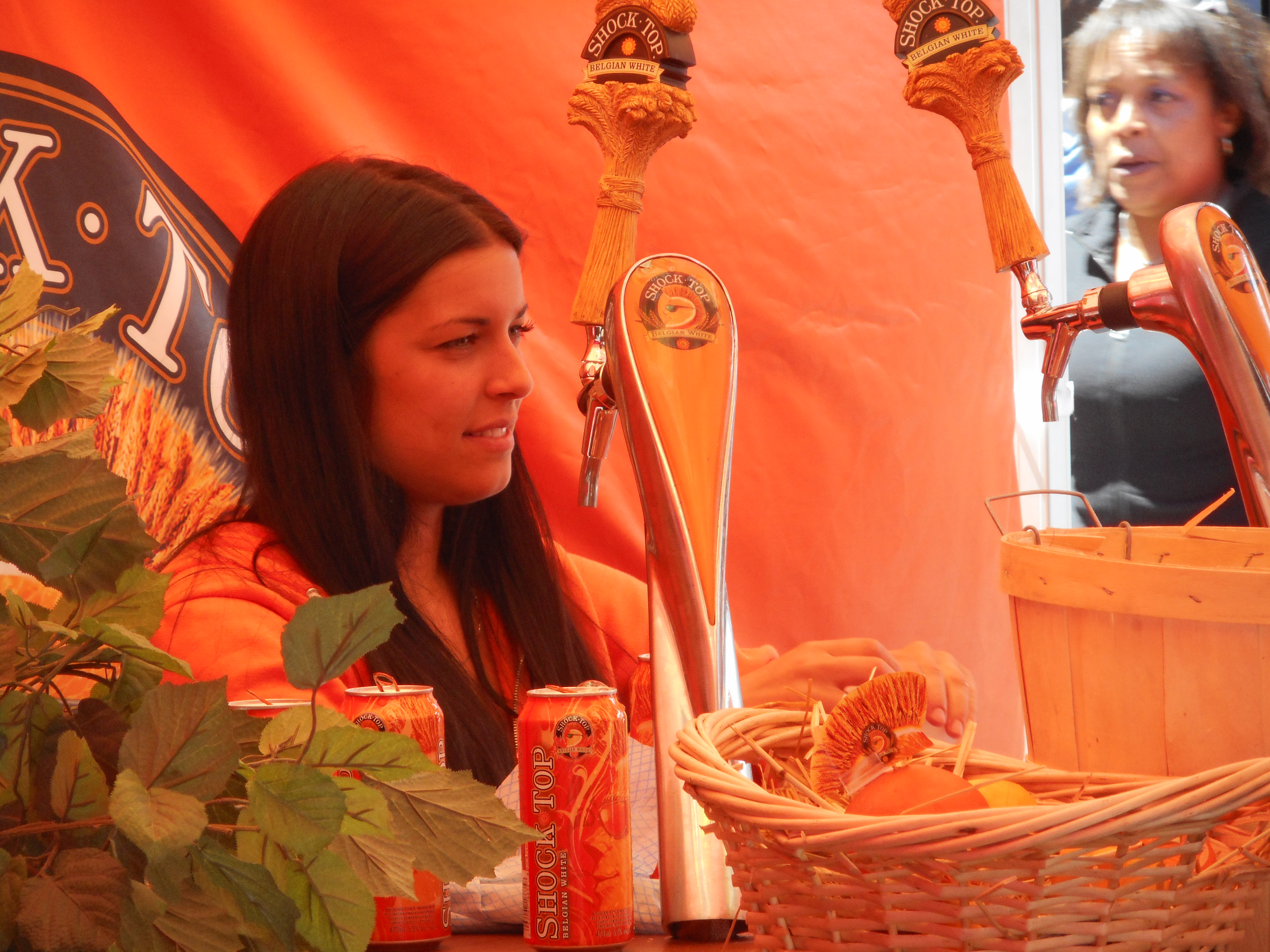
Shock Top being served in Montreal in 2015

The brand was introduced in February 2006 with its flagship Belgian White Witbeer. Anheuser-Busch advertised the beer as if it were an upstart craft beer brewed by a small team, however, this was simply a move by Anheuser-Busch tap into the craft beer market. The early brand was described by the Dallas Observer as "the perfect symbol of Anheuser-Busch InBev's utter contempt for and cluelessness about the culture of craft beer." As the company sent out large packages to reviewers containing hundreds of dollars of merchandise, and two beers the Observer described as "Beyond awful." During Super Bowl 50 in 2016, Shock Top ran a Super Bowl ad starring comedian T.J. Miller. Anheuser-Busch intended that the ad simply put Shock Top on the map for beer drinkers and act as a stepping stone for their consumer base that enjoy Bud Light towards a more craft beer direction. The ad was not well received with Variety describing it as having the quality and prose of a YouTube ad, not a multi-million-dollar Super Bowl ad. The ad came in the midst of a close race with Molson Coors' Blue Moon, with the two brands being neck and neck in market control for Belgian Witbeers. However, despite the ad resulting in a 21% brand recognition among the 21+ age demographic, Blue Moon simply outpaced Shock Top with a campaign of smaller ads and word of mouth advertising.

=== 2017 rebranding ===
On February 27, 2017, after 11 years of operation, Anheuser-Busch announced a total re-brand of Shock Top, with a new simplified logo focusing more on "Wedgehead" the brand's mascot, an orange wedge with a Mohawk and sunglasses, as well as introducing vibrantly colored packages, and a new, smaller, slate of products in an effort to brand the company with a "laid-back carefree attitude."

By the time of their purchase with Tilray, the company only sold two beverages: their flagship Belgian White, and Zest.

=== Tilray sale ===
On August 7, Anheuser-Busch sold Shock Top, and seven other brands, to Tilray, along with all current employees, breweries and brewpubs associated with the brand. The move came after Anheuser-Busch re-evaluated if they wished to continue their partnership and ownership of the various Craft Brew Alliance brands, while also shedding some of their less profitable brands in the wake of the financial contraction to the company brought on by the 2023 Bud Light boycott. The move made Tilray the fifth largest craft beer producer in the country.

== Products ==
=== Belgian White ===
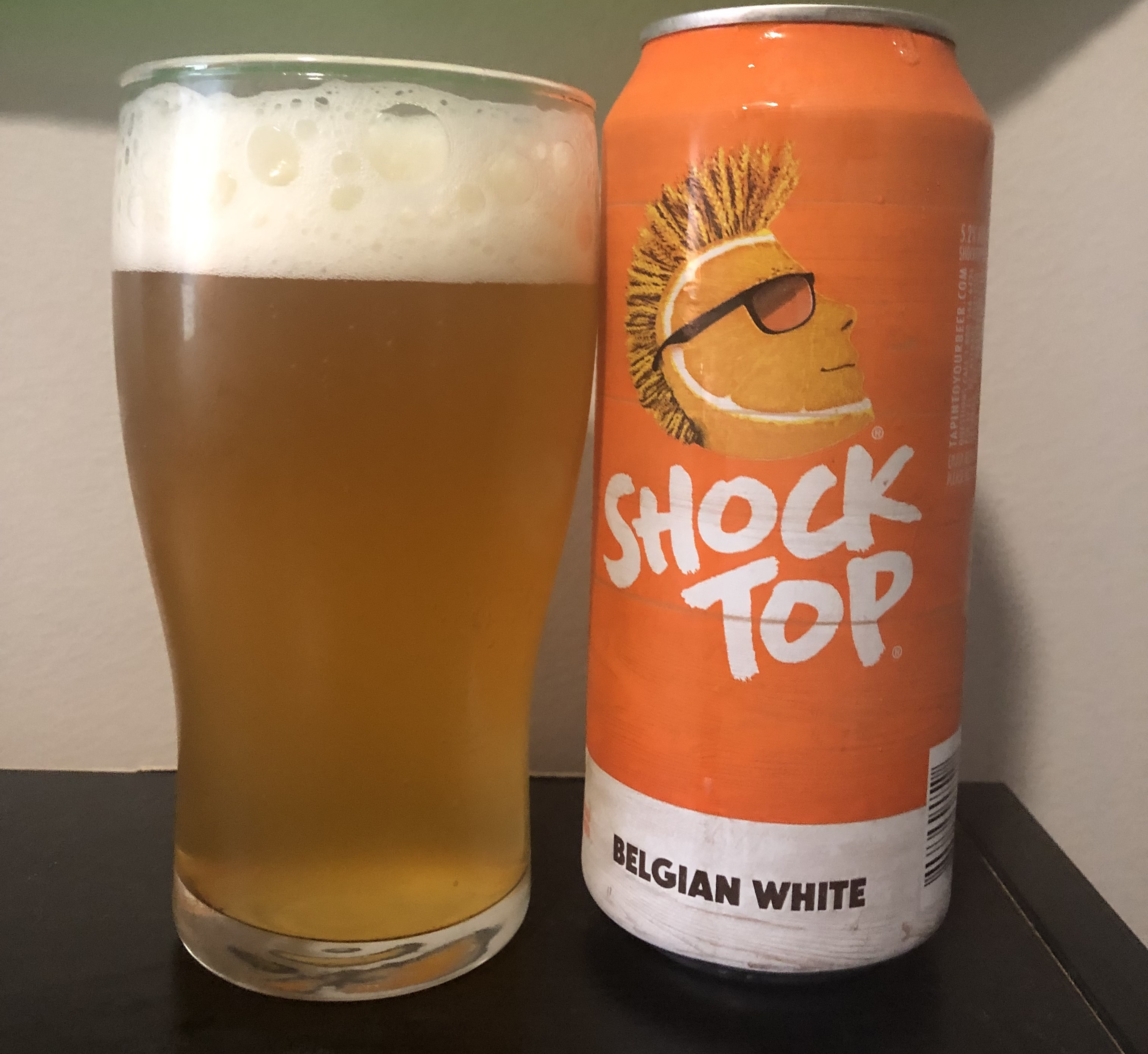
Belgian White after 2017

Their original and flagship product. A Belgian-Style, spiced Witbeer that is unfiltered for a cloudy finish. The beer is spiced with orange lemon and lime peels for a citrusy finish and a abv of 5.2%.

=== Zest ===
A light Witbeer boasting only 90 calories and 3.1 carbs, the beer is spiced with orange and lemon peels and has an abv of 4%.

=== Lemon Shandy ===
A witbeer and lemonade shandy, introduced in 2012 as a summer seasonal beverage. It has a 4.2% abv and is only available between March and July.

=== Ruby Fresh ===
Released as part of their 2017 rebranding, "Ruby Fresh" is a witbeer spiced with grapefruit for a tart and sweet take on the original Belgian white flavor.

=== Holy Citrus ===
Released as part of their 2017 rebranding, "Holy Citrus" was a witbeer spiced with Buddha's hand for a sweet floral flavor with a mild zest. The beer was a limited run to commemorate the rebranding and could only be found in variety packs, and was never sold as a stand-alone beer.

=== Citrus Pearl ===
Released as part of their 2017 rebranding, "Citrus Pearl" is a seasonal, summer only witbeer spiced with Finger lime.

=== Sunset Orange ===
Released as part of their 2017 rebranding, "Sunset Orange" focused heavily on the orange peel spice of the flagship Belgian White, spicing the beer with only orange.

=== Inner Beauty ===
Released as part of their 2017 rebranding, "Inner Beauty" is a seasonal, fall and winter only witbeer spiced with Jamaican tangelo.

=== Twisted Pretzel Wheat ===
On national pretzel day, August 26, 2014, Shock Top released a limited run pretzel themed beverage, "Twisted Pretzel Wheat". Jill Vaughn, Shock Top's brewmaster stated the reasoning for the flavor was that "Pretzels are everyone’s favorite beer snack." The beer would be brewed with wheat, caramel malt, orange peels and a rich pretzel flavor, and have a dark caramel color and 5.2% abv.

=== Wheat IPA ===
Introduced commercially on February 6, 2013, "Wheat IPA" was an India Pale Ale brewed as their flagship Belgian White, but with hops and citrus peels added. The result was a unique tasting hybridization of witbeer and IPA with a 5.8% abv.

=== Honey Bourbon Cask Wheat ===
Introduced in 2014, "Honey Bourbon Cask Wheat" is spiced with honey and then aged in oak barrels like bourbon whiskey to give it a smokey bourbon like flavoring.

=== Honeycrisp Apple Wheat ===
Introduced in 2013 as a seasonal beer. "Honeycrisp Apple Wheat" was an attempt to hybridize witbeer with Hard cider, mostly by heavily spicing the witbeer with apple peels. The beer was discontinued in 2016 following heavy criticism following an advertising campaign which made it appear the beer was a cider, when it was just an apple spiced beer. The beer was Anheuser-Busch's first, and then only, foray into hard cider, until their release of Johnny Appleseed in 2014.

=== Raspberry Wheat ===
A Raspberry flavored witbeer, "Raspberry Wheat" was introduced as the brand's original seasonal winter beer in 2011, the beer struggled due to the rise in popularity in pumpkin themed winter and fall beer, and was discontinued in 2016.

== Sustainability ==
In 2015, Shock Top donated $100,000 to Drop-A-Brick, a company that produces rubber bricks to be placed in toilets to reduce their water consumption. The donation saved the project from going under and highlighted the breweries interest in water conservation. All Shock Top breweries are designed to create as little water waste as possible.
