= Averie Swanson =

American brewmaster

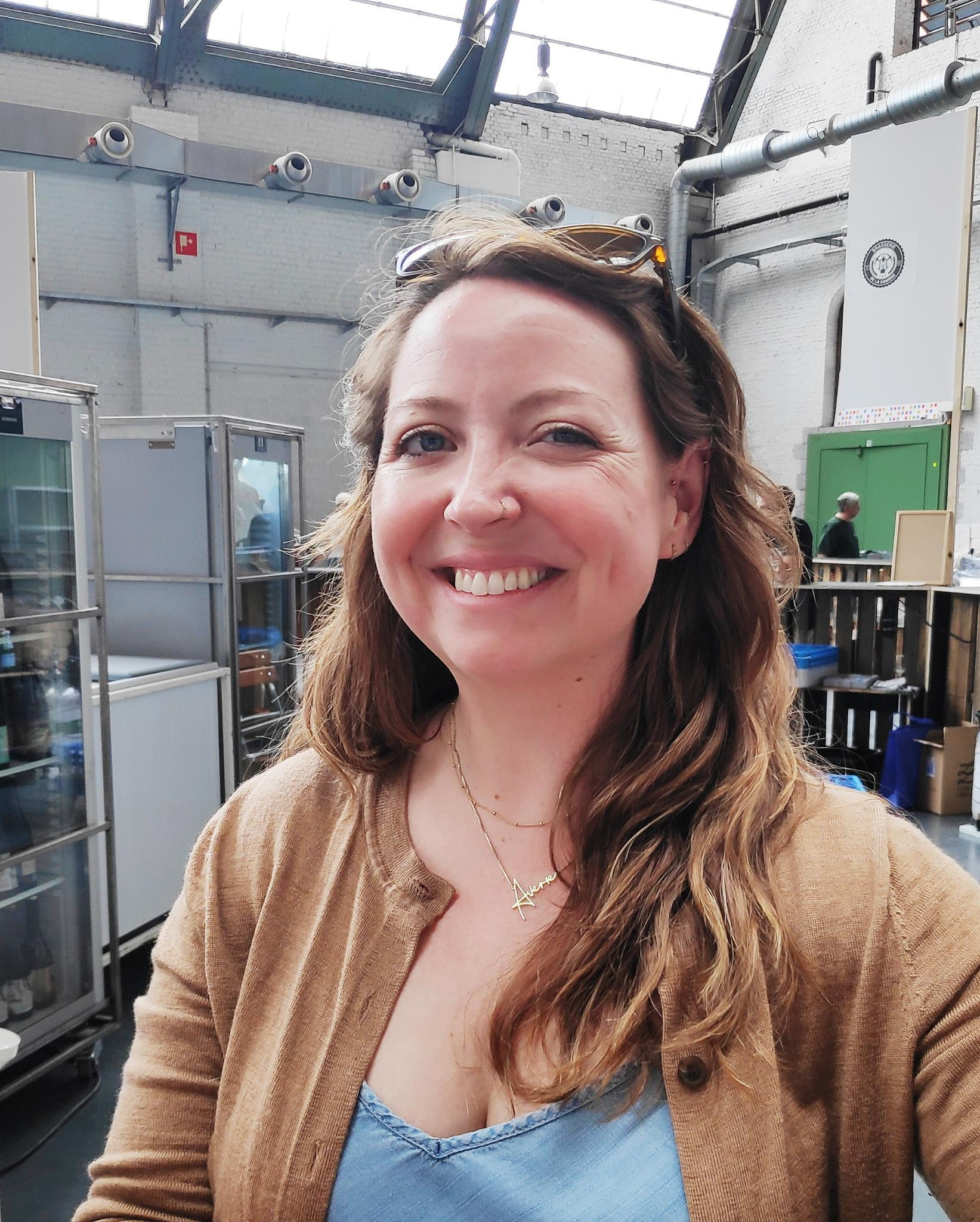

Averie Swanson is an American brew master.

Swanson spent her childhood in Houston. At 24, she moved to Austin.

She graduated from the University of Houston in biology and then worked for two years in a neonatal research clinic in the intensive care unit at the Children's Hospital of Texas.

In 2018, she passed the Master Cicerone exam after three attempts. She is also one of the 19 people in the world to have had this examination, among which only 3 women.

Her father was born in Chicago.

== Career ==
Swanson began brewing with a brewing kit.

In 2013, she began an internship at the American brewery Jester King, in Austin, Texas. This brewery, opened in 2010, specializes in spontaneous fermentation and mixed cultures of indigenous yeasts. In 2016, Swanson became the brew master of the company.

After several years, she leaves Jester King and takes a sabbatical. She then resumed work as a consultant for the American brewery Half Acre, in particular on their mixed culture program.

The managers of the brewery suggest that she brews within their space and are particularly interested in scaling up activities. She thus begins her new project called Keeping Together, also bringing the philosophy and know-how of Jester King to Chicago, which already houses more than 170 breweries. She works in particular with artist Jessica Deahl for the artistic part of the project.
