= Brian Schneider (American football) =

American football coach (born 1971)

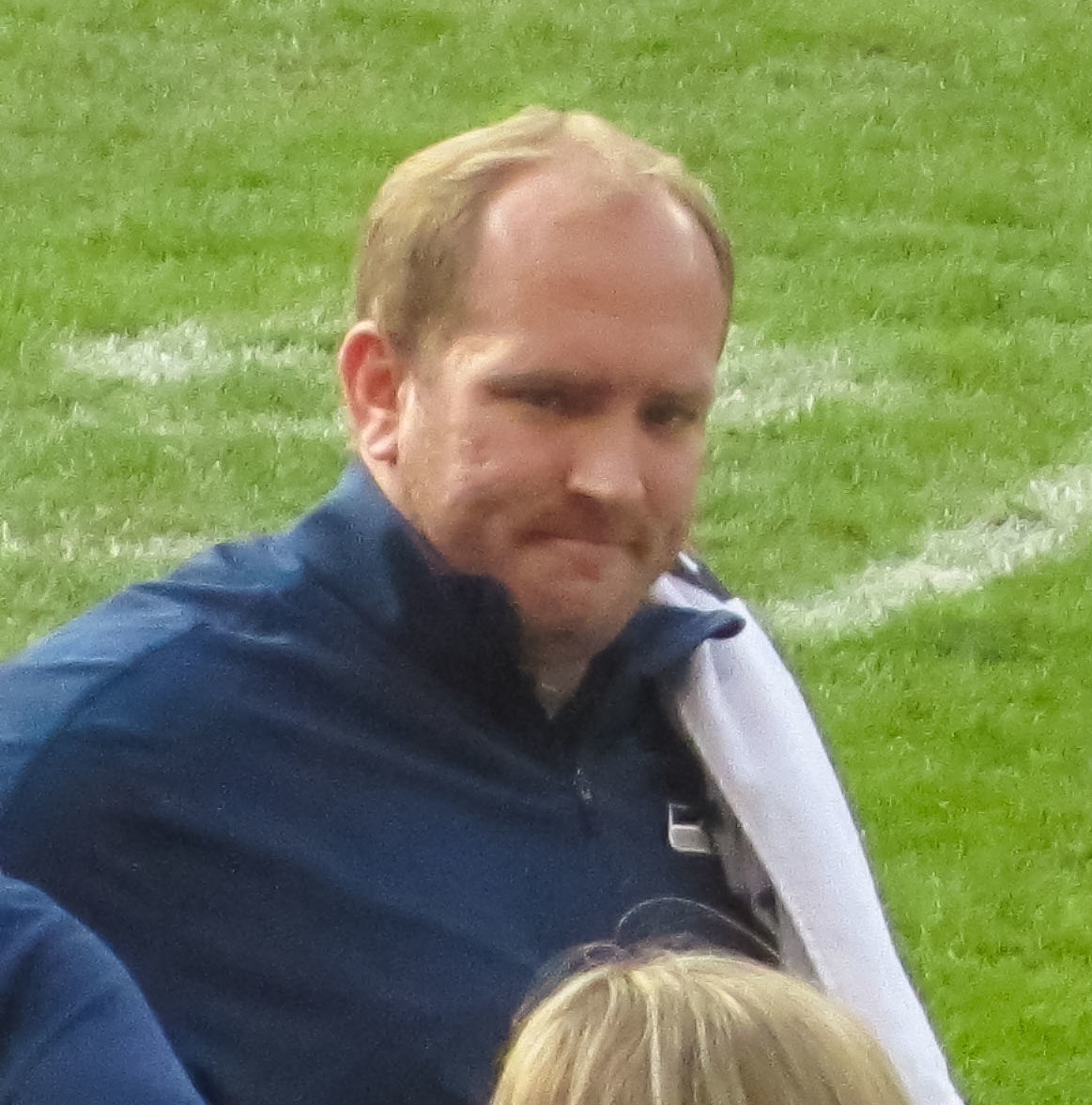
- Schneider with the Seattle Seahawks in 2012

Washington Commanders
- Title: Assistant special teams coordinator

Personal information
- Born: May 16, 1971 (age 55); San Diego, California, U.S.

Career information
- Position: Linebacker
- High school: Pomona (Arvada, Colorado)
- College: Colorado State (1990–1993)

Career history
- Colorado State Rams (1994–1996) Graduate assistant; Colorado State Rams (1997–2002) Special teams coordinator / tight ends coach; UCLA Bruins (2003–2005) Special teams coordinator / safeties / linebackers coach; Iowa State Cyclones (2006) Special teams coordinator / tight ends coach; Oakland Raiders (2007–2008) Special teams coordinator; USC Trojans (2009) Special teams coordinator; Seattle Seahawks (2010–2020) Special teams coordinator; Jacksonville Jaguars (2021) Special teams coordinator; San Francisco 49ers (2022–2024) Special teams coordinator; Washington Commanders (2025–present) Assistant special teams coordinator

Awards and highlights
- Super Bowl champion (XLVIII); First-team All-WAC (1993)

Brian Schneider (born May 16, 1971) is an American professional football coach who is the assistant special teams coordinator for the Washington Commanders of the National Football League (NFL). He played college football as a linebacker for the Colorado State Rams and has been a special teams coordinator for several teams since the late 1990s.

== Playing career ==
After being a three sport athlete at Pomona High School, Schneider went on to be a linebacker from 1990 to 1993 at Colorado State. He was a three-year starter and earned first-team All-Conference honors as a senior and was an honorable mention All-American.

== Coaching career ==
=== Colorado State ===
Schneider began his career in coaching at his alma mater, working as a graduate assistant for three seasons. In 1997 he was given a promotion to become the team's special teams coordinator and tight ends coach, and he held both positions until after the 2002 season.

=== UCLA ===
In February 2003, Schneider joined UCLA's coaching staff and stayed there for three years working with the linebackers and safeties in addition to his duties coaching the special teams for the Bruins.

=== Iowa State ===
In 2006, Schneider once again coached tight ends in addition to the special teams, this time for Dan McCarney at Iowa State.

=== Oakland Raiders ===
Originally hired to coach for the Air Force Academy, after a call, Schneider made the leap to the NFL. In 2007 and 2008, Schneider was the special team's coordinator for the Oakland Raiders. In both seasons, Shane Lechler was voted into the Pro Bowl and led the league in punting.

=== USC ===
Schneider spent 2009 working under Pete Carroll as the special teams coordinator at USC.

=== Seattle Seahawks ===
Following Carroll to the NFL, Schneider became the special teams coordinator for the Seattle Seahawks, a position he held for 11 years until he left on September 11, 2020, for personal reasons. During his time with the Seahawks, he won his first Super Bowl title when the Seahawks defeated the Denver Broncos in Super Bowl XLVIII.

=== Jacksonville Jaguars ===
On January 22, 2021, it was announced that Schneider would be returning to coaching as a part of Urban Meyer's staff. He was named the team's special teams coordinator. On May 22, 2021, he stepped away from the Jaguars indefinitely for personal reasons.

=== San Francisco 49ers ===
On March 7, 2022, it was announced that Schneider would be hired as the special teams coordinator for the San Francisco 49ers. Schneider was fired by the 49ers on January 7, 2025.

=== Washington Commanders ===
On February 18, 2025, Schneider was hired as the assistant special teams coordinator for the Washington Commanders.

== Personal life ==
Schneider and his wife Kelli have a daughter and three sons.
