= Keith Villa =

American brewmaster

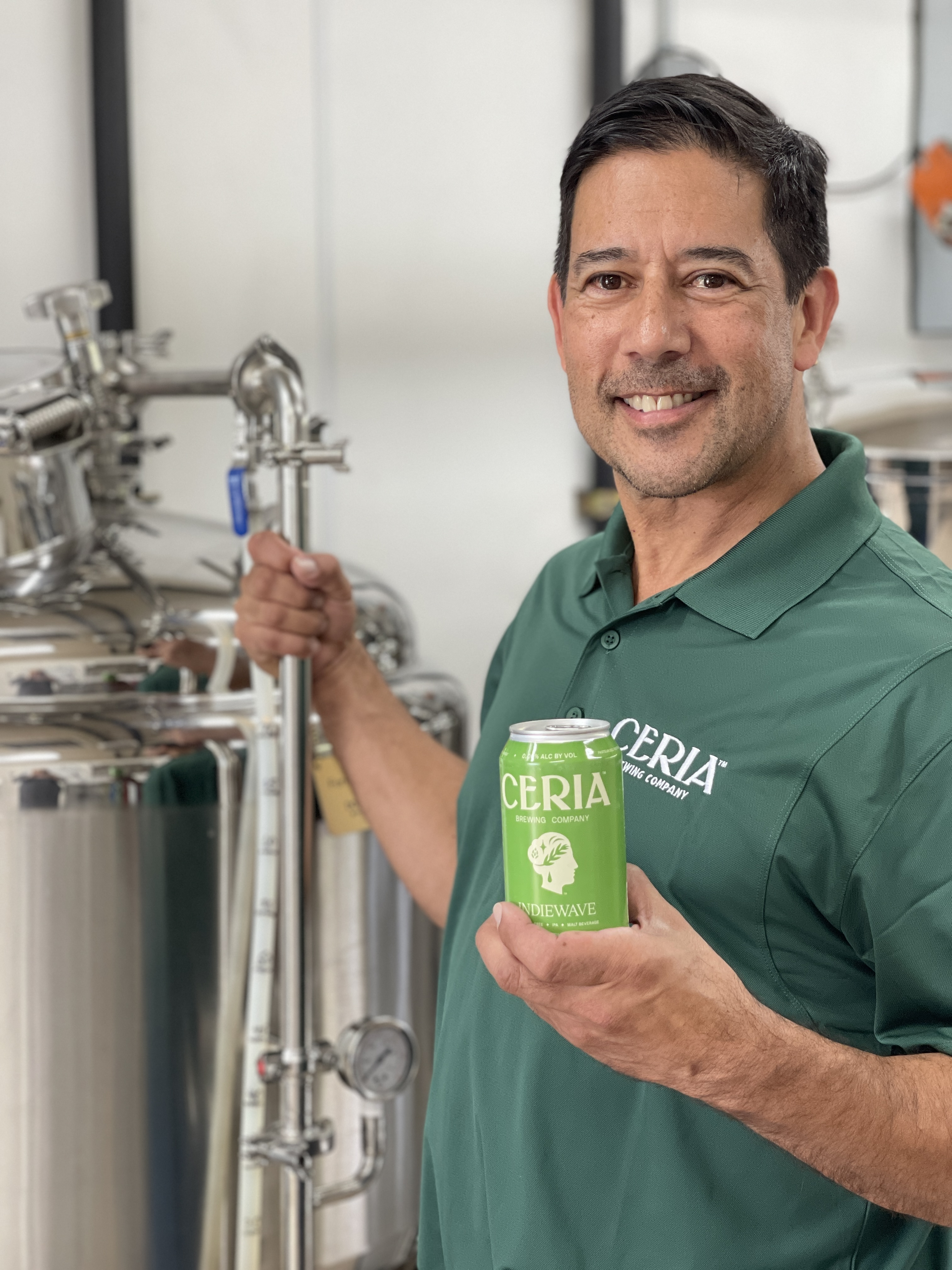
- Villa with a can of Ceria Indiewave alcohol-free IPA
- Born: 1962 (age 63–64); Wheat Ridge, Colorado, U.S.
- Education: University of Colorado Boulder (BS); University of Brussels (PhD)
- Occupation: Brewmaster
- Employer(s): Molson Coors (former); Ceria Brewing Company (co-founder)
- Known for: Creation of Blue Moon beer
- Spouse: Jodi Villa

Keith Villa (born 1962) is an American brewmaster from Wheat Ridge, Colorado. In 1995 while working for Coors, Villa created Blue Moon beer.

== Biography ==
=== Early life and education ===
Villa grew up in Denver and then Arvada, Colorado. After graduating from Pomona High School in Arvada, he began a pre-med program at University of Colorado Boulder, graduating with an undergraduate degree in molecular biology in 1986. While in college he began homebrewing.

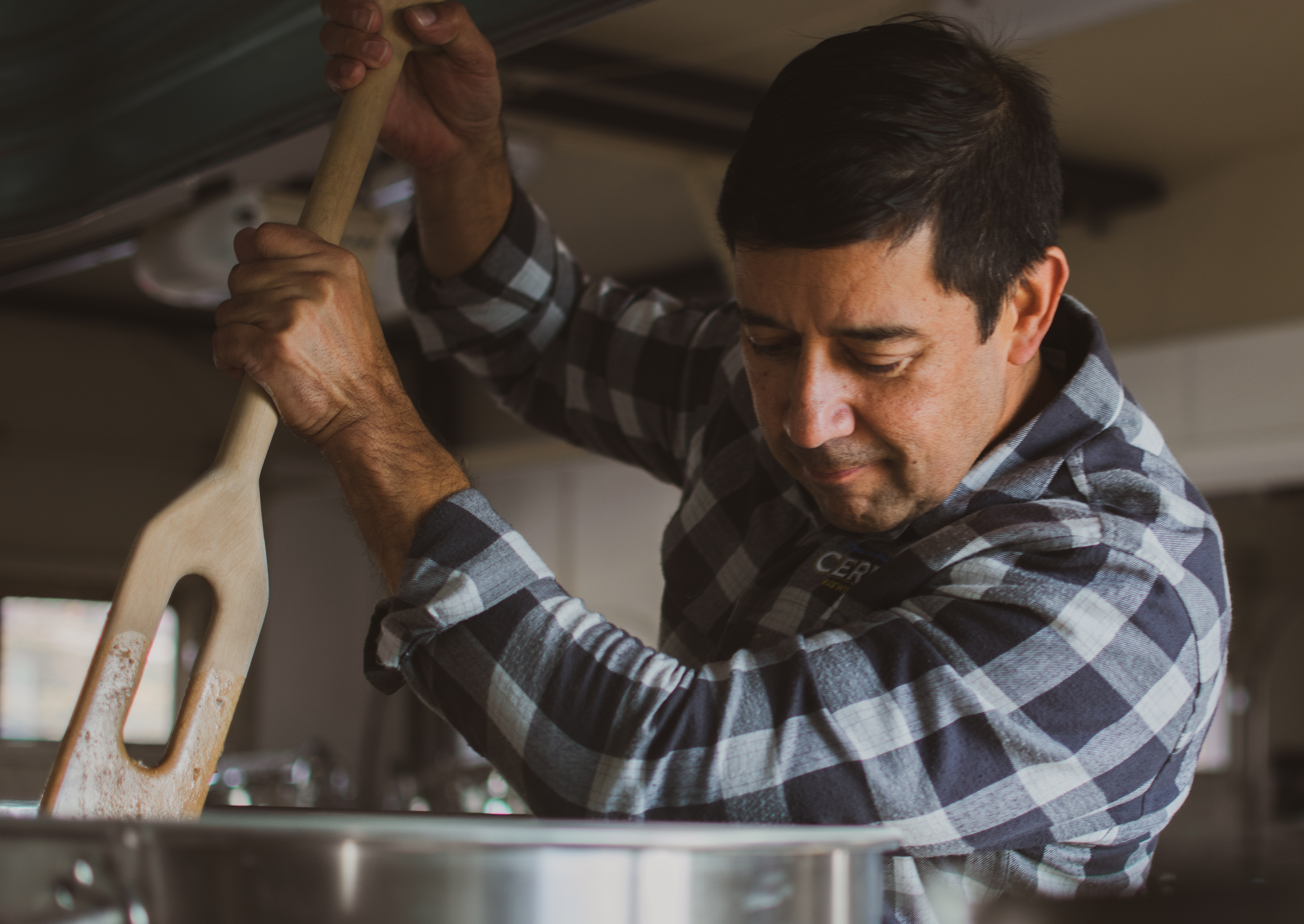
Villa brewing

He has a doctorate in Wetenschappen (science) with a brewing specialization from University of Brussels. His dissertation was titled "The effects of plasmid amplification of the ILV5 and ILV3 genes on the expression and sub-mitochondrial localization of ILV gene products in Saccharomyces cerevisiae during aerobic and fermentative growth." Villa’s second thesis was titled "Saccharomyces cerevisiae cellular systems consisting of superoxide dismutase, glutathione, and trehalose provide protection against oxidative stress when shifting from anaerobic to aerobic conditions during brewery fermentations."

=== Coors career ===
After graduation, Coors Brewing Company hired him to perform fermentation research. After working for Coors for two years, Villa moved to Brussels, Belgium to earn his doctorate.

Villa returned to Colorado and to Coors in 1991 and created Blue Moon Belgian White in 1995, according to 5280 one of the first nationally available commercial craft-style beers and one that "helped instigate the craft beer revolution" in the United States.

During his time at Coors, Villa created several other craft-style beers, including variations on Blue Moon. He retired from Molson Coors in 2017.

=== Ceria career ===
After the 2012 legalization of marijuana in Colorado, Villa began homebrewing again, experimenting with a cannabis-infused beer. After his retirement from Coors, he and his wife, Jodi, co-founded Ceria Brewing Company to produce alcohol-free cannabis-infused beers. In 2022, due to issues with federal regulation of cannabis, the company stopped offering cannabis-infused beers and focussed on low- and no-alcohol beers.

== Recognition ==
In 2025, Villa was named Global Brewer of the Year and one of the World Beer Awards' Icons of Beer.

In 2015, Beverage World magazine named Villa to their list of “50 Beverage Disruptors: Individuals whose innovative impact has changed the status quo in the beverage world.”

== Personal life ==
Villa is Hispanic. He is married to Jodi Villa.
