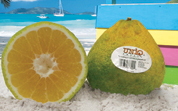

Scientific classification
- Kingdom: Plantae
- Clade: Tracheophytes
- Clade: Angiosperms
- Clade: Eudicots
- Clade: Rosids
- Order: Sapindales
- Family: Rutaceae
- Genus: Citrus
- Species: C. reticulata × C. paradisi

= Jamaican tangelo =

Citrus fruit and plant

The Jamaican tangelo, also known by proprietary names ugli fruit (pronounced "ugly") and uniq fruit (pronounced "unique"), is a citrus fruit that arose on the island of Jamaica through the natural hybridization of a tangerine or orange with a grapefruit (or pomelo), and is thus a tangelo. The original tree is believed to have been a hybrid formed from varieties of Seville orange, grapefruit and tangerine.

As a hybrid species, it is usually represented as Citrus reticulata × paradisi.

== Discovery ==
This tangelo was a natural hybrid, having arisen spontaneously like the grapefruit, near Brown's Town, Jamaica. It was discovered growing wild in or about 1917, then passed through several generations of budwood grafting, selecting for fewer seeds. Since the 1930s the main producer has been the Sharp family of Trout Hall plantation in Trout Hall village Clarendon Parish, Jamaica. It was exported to Canada and England by 1934, and to the United States in 1942. 'UGLI' is a registered trademark of Cabel Hall Citrus Limited, under which it markets the fruit, the name being a variation of the word "ugly", which refers to the fruit's unsightly appearance, with rough, wrinkled, greenish-yellow rind, wrapped loosely around the orange pulpy citrus inside.

== Description ==
The light-green surface blemishes turn orange when the fruit is at its peak ripeness. The Jamaican tangelo is usually slightly larger than a grapefruit (but this varies) and has fewer seeds. The flesh is very juicy and tends toward the sweet side of the tangerine rather than the bitter side of its grapefruit lineage, with a fragrant rind.

The taste is often described as sourer than an orange and less bitter than a grapefruit, however, and is more commonly guessed to be a lemon–tangerine hybrid. The fruit is seasonal, from December to April in the Northern hemisphere. It is distributed in Europe and the United States between November and April, and is on occasion available from July to September.

== Gallery ==
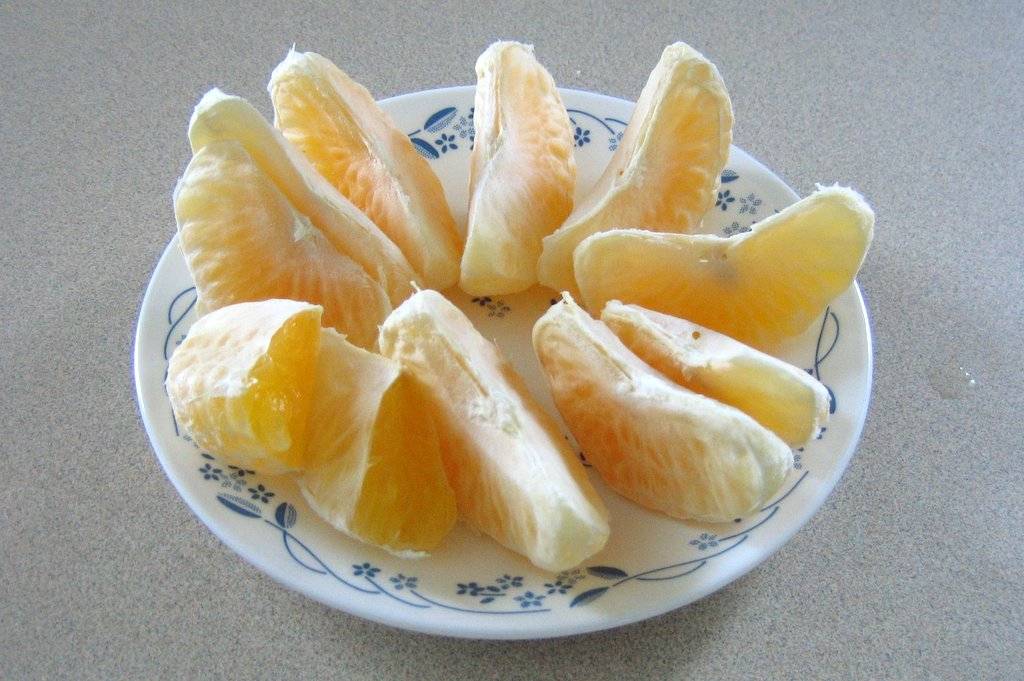
Jamaican tangelo, peeled and sectioned

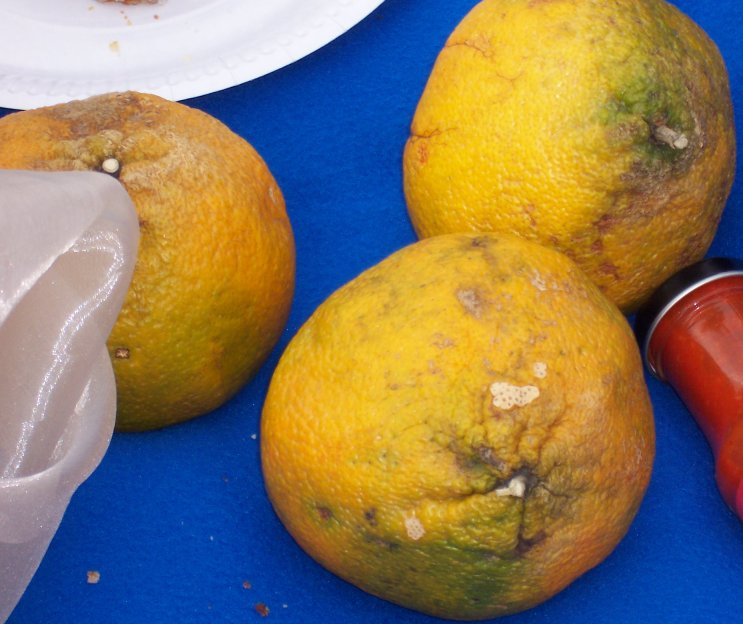
Roundish version
