= Blue Moon (beer) =

Brand of beer

- Manufacturer: Blue Moon Brewing Co. (Molson Coors)
- Introduced: 1995
- Alcohol by volume: 5.4%
- Style: Witbier
- Website: bluemoonbrewingcompany.com

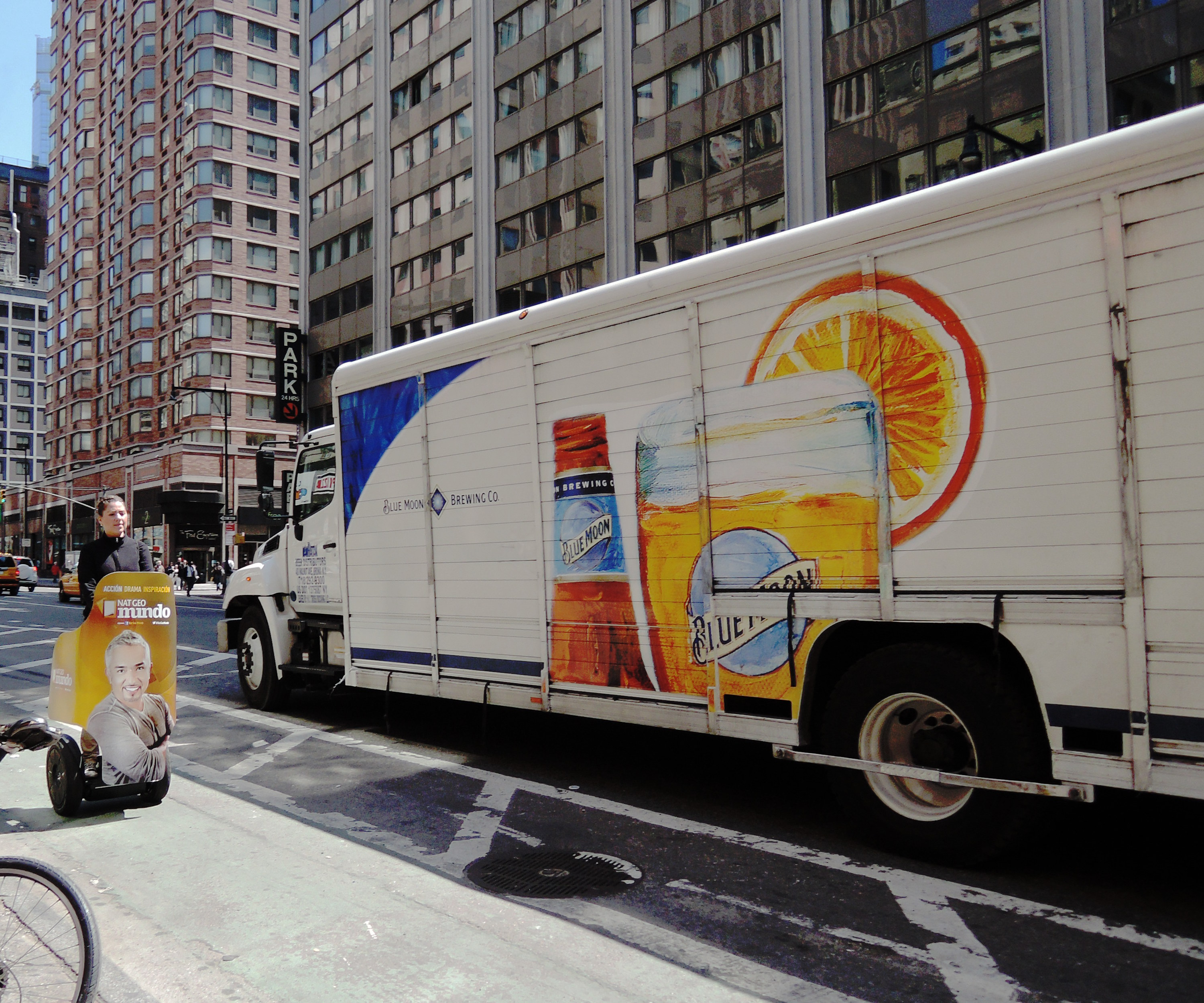
Beer truck in Manhattan

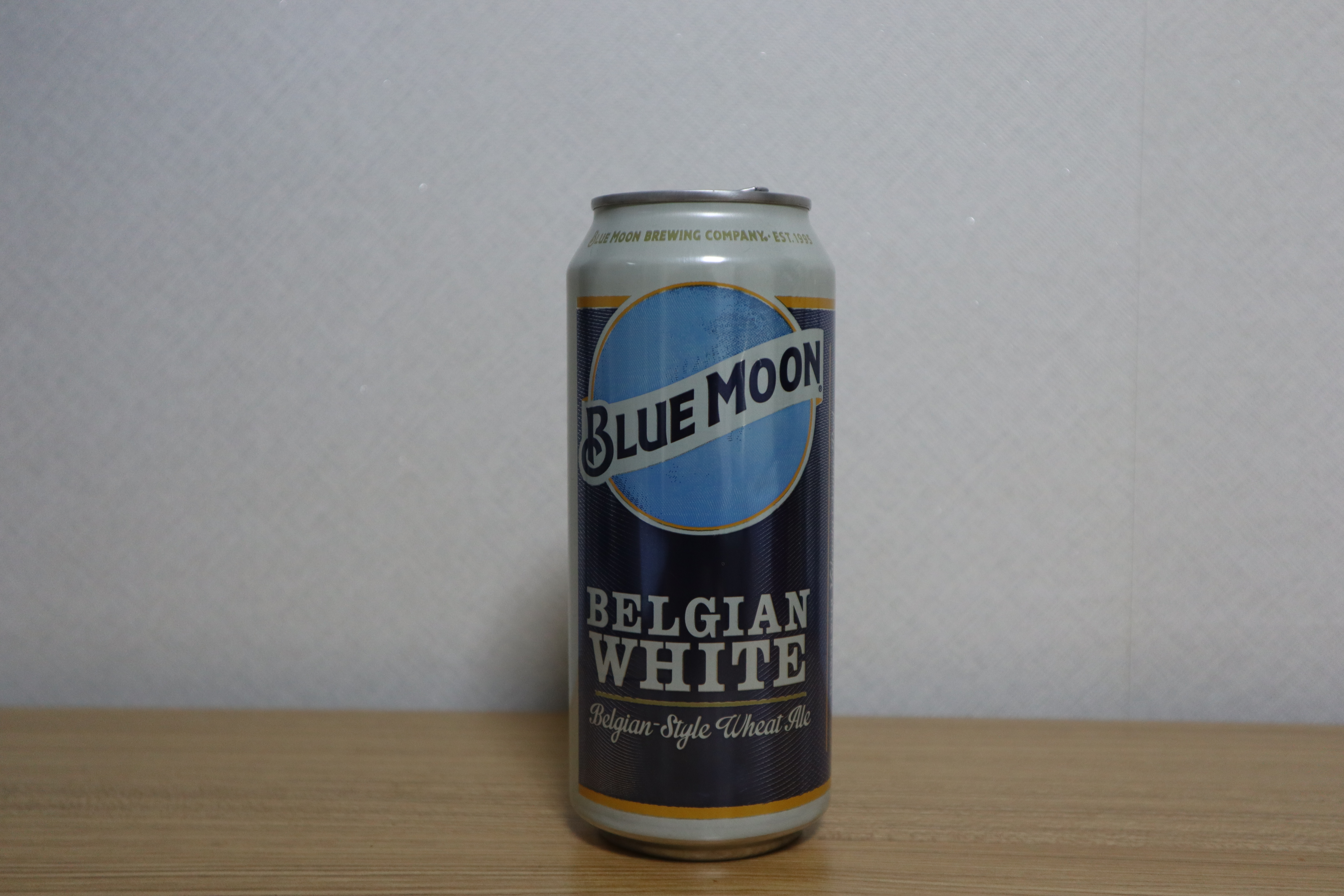
A can of Blue Moon

Blue Moon Belgian White is a Belgian-style witbier brewed by Molson Coors under the name the Blue Moon Brewing Co. It was launched in 1995, and was originally brewed in Golden, Colorado, United States.

== Background ==
Originally called Bellyslide Belgian White, the beer was created by Keith Villa, a brewer at the Sandlot Brewery at Coors Field, Denver, Colorado (owned by the Molson Coors Brewing Company), where it is still brewed as of 2024. Blue Moon is also brewed at the Molson Brewery in Montreal, Quebec, Canada, which can be sold in the US depending on location and supply from other manufacturing facilities; it may also be exported to Europe. Blue Moon Brewing Co. is an entity of Tenth and Blake Beer Company, the craft and import division of Molson Coors.

The grain bill for Blue Moon includes malted barley, white wheat, orange peel, coriander and oats—and is usually served with a slice of orange, which its brewmasters claim accentuates the flavor of the brew.

Available in cans, bottles and kegs, Blue Moon has 5.4% alcohol by volume. In Minnesota, the alcohol content of all Blue Moon beers bought outside of bars or liquor stores is 3.2% alcohol by weight (approximately 4.0% alcohol by volume). Blue Moon Brews and seasonal brews sold outside of grocery and convenience stores are 5.4% by volume.

== Variations of Blue Moon ==
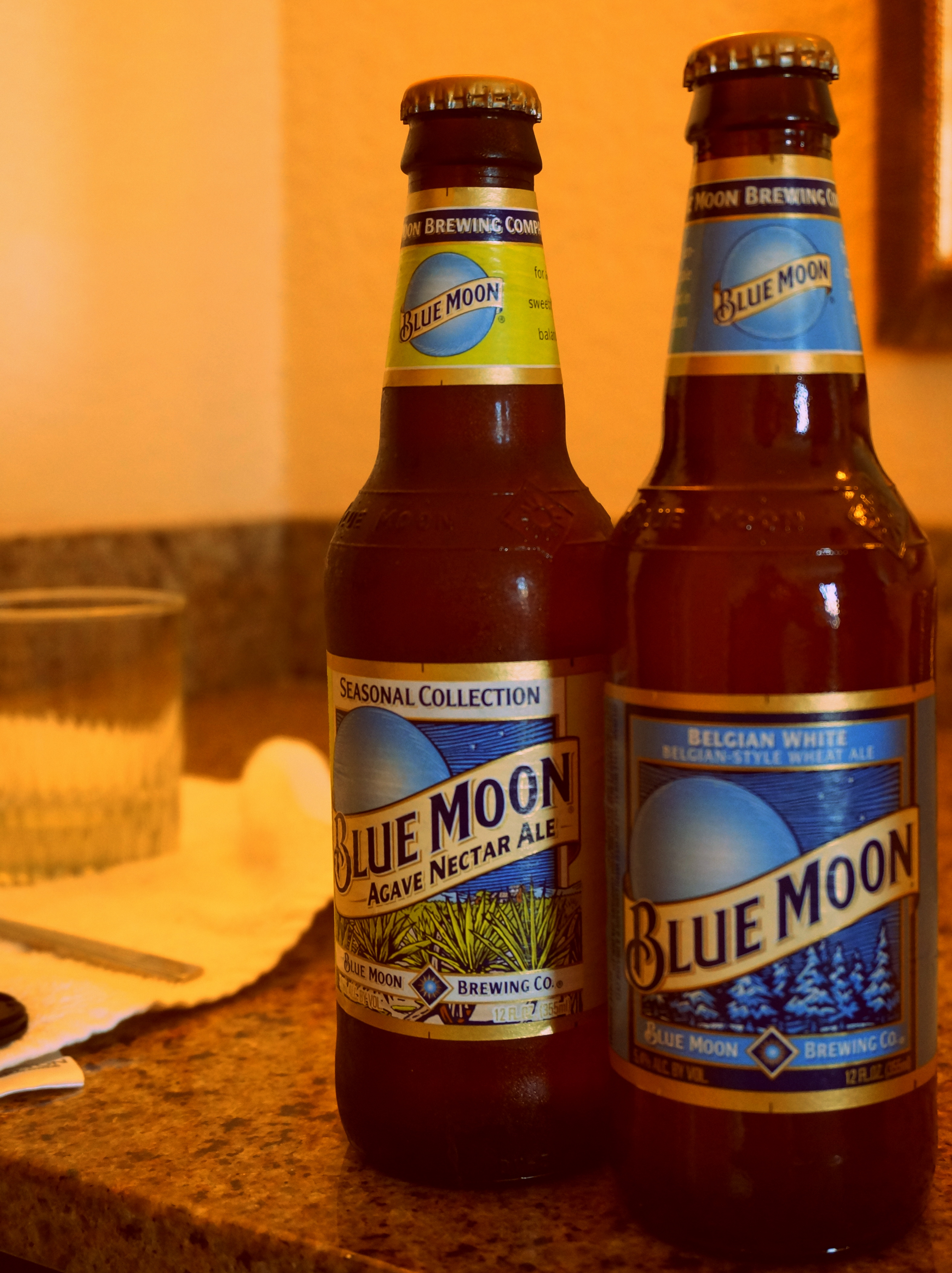
Blue Moon Agave Nectar Ale and Blue Moon

In addition to their original Belgian White variety, Blue Moon Brewing Company offers Blue Moon Summer Ale, renamed Honey Moon in 2006. Honey Moon contains 5.2% alcohol by volume in a standard 12 fluid ounce bottle. The beer was renamed "Summer Honey Wheat" in 2011, and is still sold under that name.

In autumn, Blue Moon markets Blue Moon Pumpkin Ale, renamed Harvest Moon in 2007. This variety contains the flavors of pumpkin and other seasonal spices. Harvest Moon is typically available in bottles from mid-September through December. It contains 5.7% alcohol by volume in a standard 12 fluid ounce bottle. The beer was later renamed "Harvest Pumpkin Ale", a name it is still marketed under.

Blue Moon offers Blue Moon Winter Abbey Ale during the winter season. Its name was changed to Full Moon with the subtitle "Blue Moon Winter Ale" in 2007. It is brewed with natural flavor and a caramel color. Full Moon contains 5.6% alcohol in a standard 12 fluid ounce bottle. The name was changed to "Mountain Abbey Ale" in 2012.

In spring, Blue Moon provides Blue Moon Spring Blonde Ale, originally known as Rising Moon. In 2011 the recipe was changed removing the Makrut lime leaves. The new recipe focuses more on orange and lemon peel to add the citrus flavors. In 2013 the beer was changed to "Valencia Grove Amber", an amber ale brewed with Valencia orange peel, roasted malts and a touch of wheat.

It addition to its seasonal brews, Blue Moon released a pale ale called Pale Moon in 2008, with filings commenced to create a Pale Moon Light. Pale Moon is now marketed as "Rounder".

Blue Moon released a revamped and renamed set of seasonal beers starting with the Winter Abbey Ale, in 2010.

In Canada, Blue Moon was introduced in 2015 as "Belgian Moon", with packaging very similar to the Blue Moon labeling found in the United States. The name was changed to Blue Moon in 2022.

== Controversies ==
=== Craft beer ===
In 2012, Blue Moon came under fire from the Brewers Association for not stating on the bottle that the beer is made by MillerCoors. The Brewers Association says that this omission allows the Blue Moon Brewing Company to masquerade as an independent craft brewer. Some other independent craft brewers agreed with the assessment. In May 2015, a California man filed suit against MillerCoors for the "Craft Beer" labeling; however, the lawsuit was dismissed by a judge in October.

=== Naming ===
In 1999, the Confédération des Brasseries de Belgique (The Confederation of Belgian Breweries) sued the then-named Coors Brewing Company over its use of the term "Belgian White". The CBB alleged Coors' advertising was misleading, and could confuse American consumers into believing Blue Moon was made in Belgium. Coors at first responded by adding "Made in USA" and "Belgian-style" in small print to the bottle labels, but refused to change its advertising or packaging.

Coors eventually settled out of court with the CBB, agreeing to change the labeling to "Belgian-style Wheat Ale". Additionally, the CBB distributes the beer to conglomerates in European countries.

The New Belgium Brewery, which makes Fat Tire Amber Ale, also complied with the CBB's request for name changes.

== Awards ==
- 1995 World Beer Championship gold medalist, White Beer category
- 1996 World Beer Championship silver medalist, White Beer category
- 1997 World Beer Championship silver medalist, White Beer category
- 2008 World Beer Cup gold medalist, Specialty Honey Lager or Ale category for Blue Moon's Honey Moon
- 2008 World Beer Cup silver medalist, Fruit and Vegetable Beer category for Chardonnay Blonde
- 2008 World Beer Cup Champion Brewery - Large Brewing Company
- 2012 World Beer Cup silver medalist - Blue Moon Vintage Blonde Ale, Fruit Wheat Beer Category
- 2016 World Beer Cup silver medalist - First Peach Ale, Fruit Wheat Beer Category

== See also ==
- Shock Top, a similar beer produced by Anheuser-Busch.
