= List of Cornell University alumni =

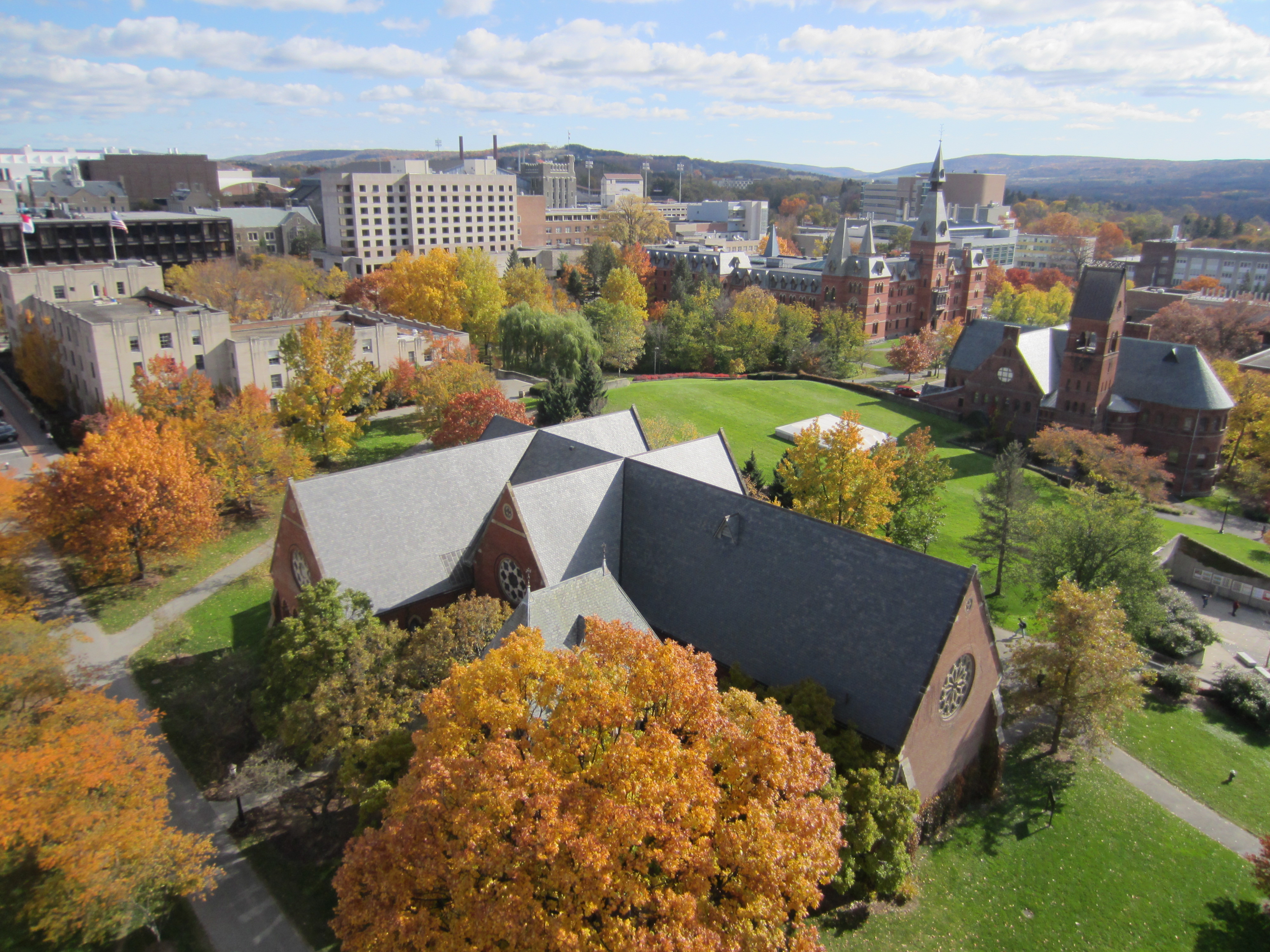
Cornell University, an Ivy League university founded in 1865 in Ithaca, New York

This list of Cornell University alumni includes notable graduates, non-graduate former students, and current students of Cornell University, an Ivy League university whose main campus is in Ithaca, New York.

Alumni are known as Cornellians, and many are noted for their accomplishments in public, professional, and corporate life. The school's alumni include 25 recipients of National Medal of Science and National Medal of Technology and Innovation combined, 38 MacArthur Fellows, 34 Marshall Scholars, 31 Rhodes Scholars, 249 elected members of the National Academy of Sciences, 201 elected members of the National Academy of Engineering, and over 190 heads of higher learning institutions. Cornell is the only university in the world with four female winners of unshared Nobel Prizes among its graduates: Pearl S. Buck, Barbara McClintock, Toni Morrison and Claudia Goldin.

As of 2006, Cornell had over 250,000 living alumni. Many alumni maintain university ties through the university's homecoming. Its alumni magazine is Cornell Magazine. In Manhattan, the university maintains the Cornell Club of New York for alumni. In 2005, Cornell ranked third nationally among universities and colleges in philanthropic giving by its alumni.

== Academia ==
=== College and university leadership ===
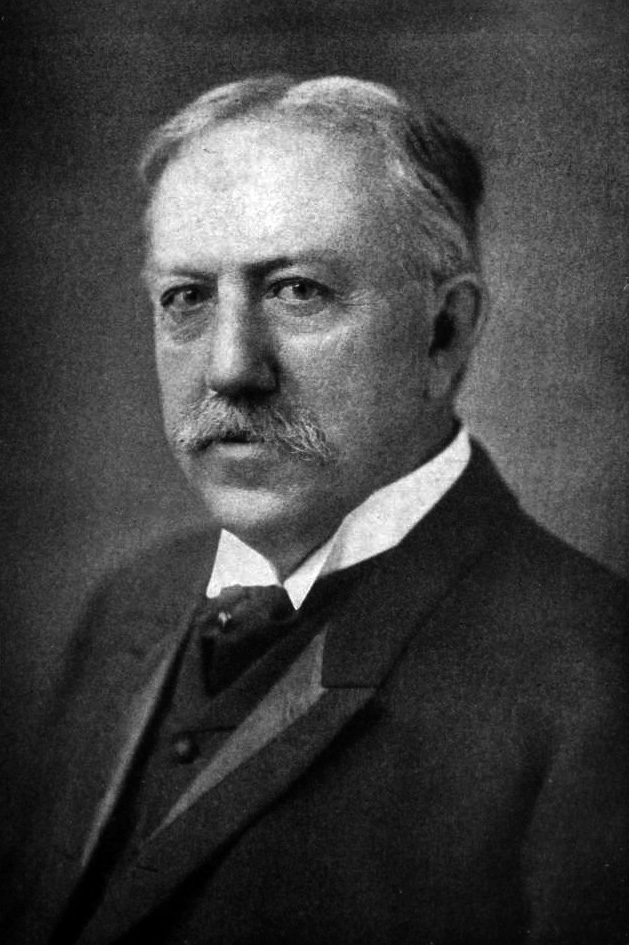
David Starr Jordan

- Walter S. Davis (M.S., 1933, Ph.D., 1941) – president of Tennessee State University (1943–1968)
- Gregory L. Fenves (B.S., 1979) – president of the University of Texas at Austin (2015–2020), president of Emory University (2020–2025), chancellor of Emory University (2025–)
- Zvi Galil (Ph.D., 1975) – dean of the Georgia Institute of Technology College of Computing (2010–19), president of Tel Aviv University (2007–09)
- Chris Gibson (MPA, 1995, M.A., 1996, Ph.D., 1998) – president of Siena College (2020–23), U.S. representative from New York (2011–17)
- Ana Guadalupe (Ph.D., 1987) – chancellor of the University of Puerto Rico, Río Piedras Campus (2009–13)
- David Starr Jordan (M.S., 1872) – chancellor of Stanford University (1913–16), president of Stanford University (1891–1913), president of Indiana University (1884–91)
- Charnvit Kasetsiri (Ph.D., 1972) – historian and rector at Thammasat University
- Steven Knapp (Ph.D., 1981) – president of George Washington University (2007–17)
- Archie Palmer (B.A., 1920) – president of the University of Tennessee at Chattanooga
- Marc Parlange (M.S., 1987, Ph.D., 1990) – president of the University of Rhode Island
- Wendy Raymond (B.A., 1982) – president of Haverford College (2019–present)
- Arthur K. Smith (Ph.D., 1970) – president of the University of Utah (1991–1997), president of the University of Houston (1997–2003), chancellor of the University of Houston System (1997–2003)
- George R. Throop (Ph.D.) - chancellor of Washington University in St. Louis (1927–44)

=== Anthropology and sociology ===
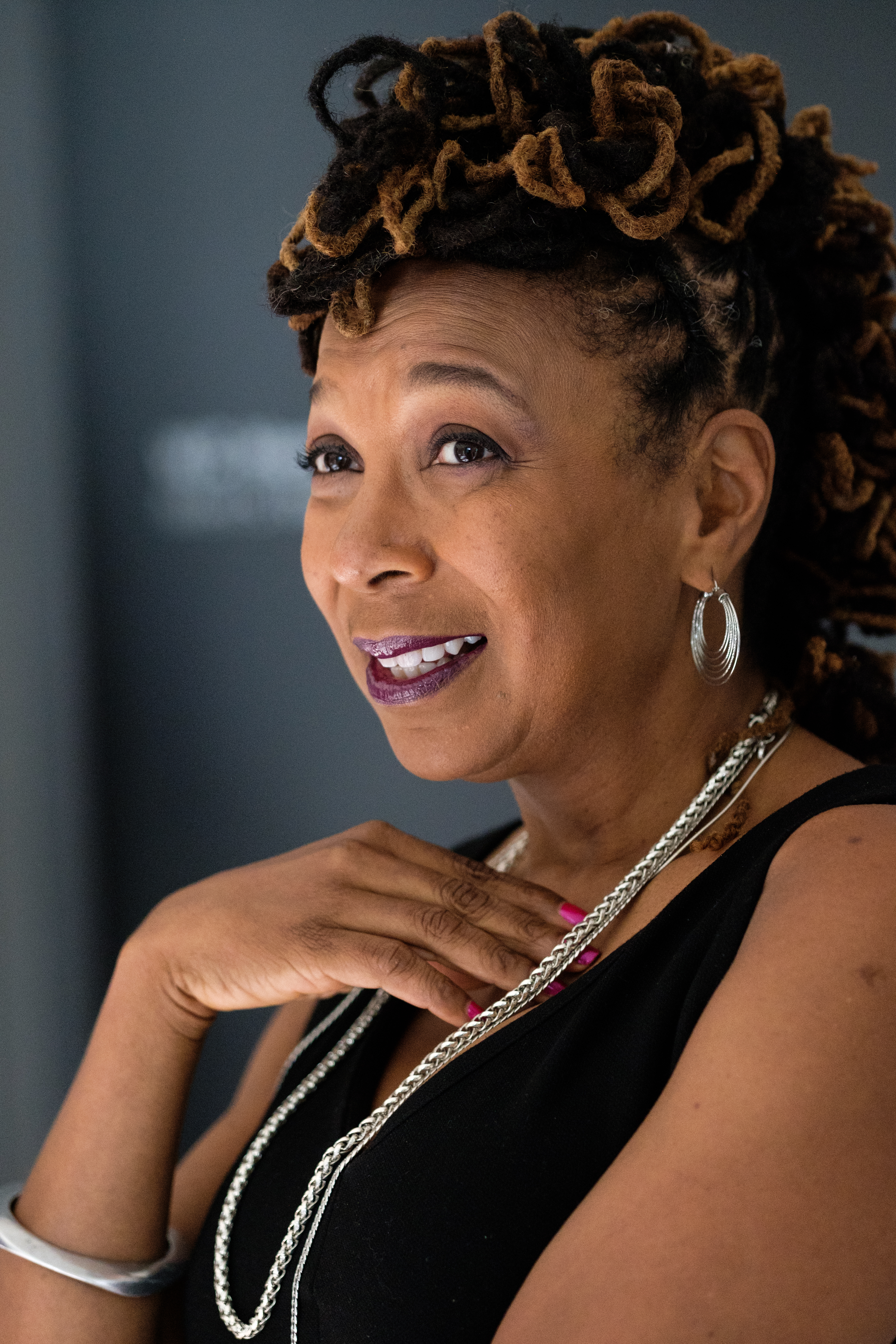
Kimberlé Crenshaw

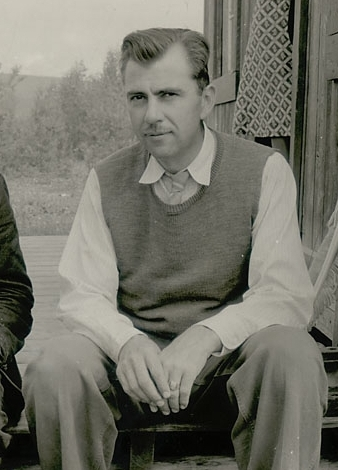
Julian Steward

- Carol Aneshensel (B.S., M.A., Ph.D.) – sociologist, professor, and vice chair of the Department of Community Health Sciences at UCLA's School of Public Health
- Sarah T. Barrows (M.A. 1893) – phonetician and phonetics pioneer
- Alfred Blumstein (B.A., Ph.D.) – criminologist, former dean of the Heinz College at Carnegie Mellon University, and member, National Academy of Engineering (1998)
- Aaron Cicourel (Ph.D.) – professor emeritus of sociology, University of California, San Diego, 1992 American Academy of Arts and Sciences fellow, and 1982 American Association for the Advancement of Science fellow
- Kimberlé Crenshaw (B.A. 1981) – critical race theory scholar, Columbia Law School
- Harry Edwards (Ph.D. 1970) – sociologist specializing on race and sports and University of California, Berkeley professor emeritus
- Shelly Errington (M.A., Ph.D.) – cultural anthropologist, professor of anthropology, University of California, Santa Cruz, and 1981 MacArthur Fellow
- Diana E. Forsythe (Ph.D. 1974) – anthropologist, University of California, San Francisco, noted for her work on artificial intelligence and medical informatics
- Daniel A. Foss (B.A.) – sociologist and author of Beyond Revolution: A New Theory of Social Movements and Freak Culture: Life Style and Politics
- Ward Goodenough (B.A. 1940) – anthropologist, University of Pennsylvania, 1971 member of National Academy of Sciences, and 1975 fellow of the American Academy of Arts and Sciences
- Sabine Hyland (B.A. 1986) – anthropologist, professor of World Christianity at University of St Andrews, specialist on khipus and religion in Peru, and 2019 Guggenheim Fellow
- Suzanne Maman – social scientist and HIV/AIDS researcher
- Erik Mueggler (B.A.) – anthropologist, professor at the University of Michigan, and 2002 MacArthur Fellow
- Mary Racelis (B.A. 1954) – anthropologist, sociologist, professor at Ateneo de Manila University and University of the Philippines Diliman, and former UNICEF regional director in Eastern and Southern Africa
- David M. Schneider (B.S. 1940, M.S. 1941) – cultural anthropologist known for studies of kinship, former William B. Ogden Distinguished Service Professor Emeritus in Anthropology, and chairman of Anthropology, University of Chicago
- G. William Skinner (B.A. 1947, Ph.D. 1954) – anthropologist and sinologist known for delineation of the physiographic macroregions of China and 1980 member of the National Academy of Sciences
- Julian Steward (B.A. 1925 zoology and biology) – anthropologist known for development of a scientific theory of cultural evolution and 1954 member of National Academy of Sciences
- Stanley Jeyaraja Tambiah (Ph.D. 1954) – social anthropologist, Esther and Sidney Rabb Professor Emeritus of Anthropology at Harvard University, 1997 recipient of the Balzan Prize, 1998 Fukuoka Asian Culture Prize, and 1994 member of the National Academy of Sciences
- Mildred Bertha Thurow Tate (Ph.D. 1935) – rural sociologist
- Brackette Williams (B.S. 1973) – anthropologist and 1997 MacArthur Fellow

=== Economics ===
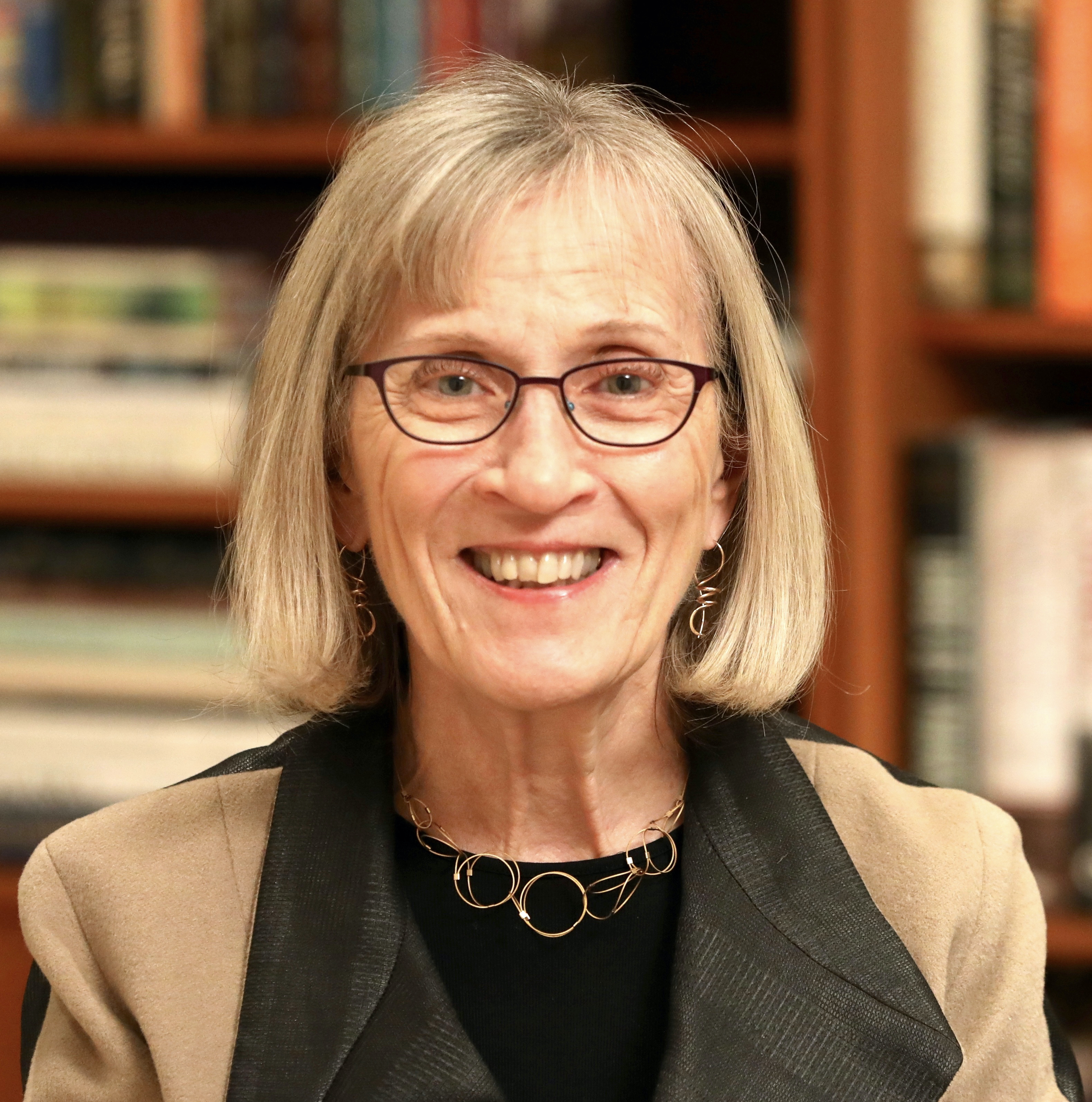
Claudia Goldin

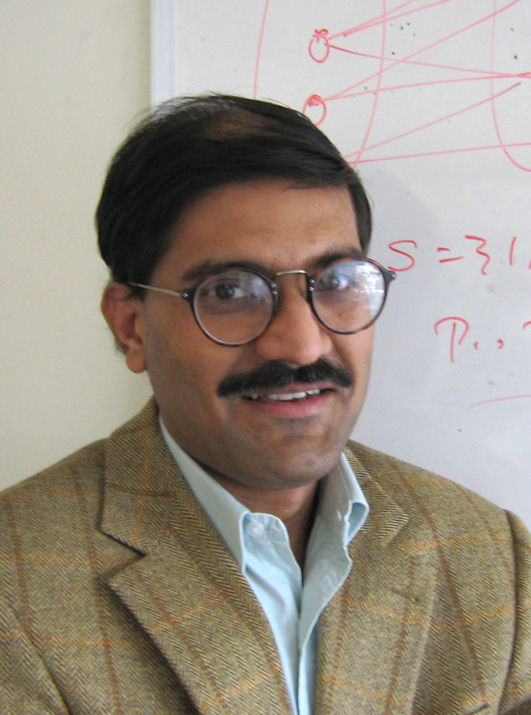
Sanjeev Goyal

- Alice Amsden (B.A. 1965) – Barton L. Weller Professor of Political Economics, MIT
- Luc Anselin (M.A. 1979, Ph.D. 1980) – principal developer of spatial econometrics, 2008 member of the National Academy of Sciences, and 2011 American Academy of Arts and Sciences fellow
- Amitrajeet A. Batabyal (B.S. 1987) – economist and academic.
- Hugh E. Conway – labor economist, professor, and construction industry expert
- Maureen Cropper (M.A. 1972, Ph.D. 1973 economics) – distinguished university professor, University of Maryland, College Park; member of the National Academy of Sciences (2008)
- Frank Fetter (M.A. 1892 philosophy) – economist, former president of the American Economic Association, and American Academy of Arts and Sciences member
- Austin Frakt (B.S. 1994) – health care economist and founder, The Incidental Economist
- Robert Gilpin (M.S. 1954) – international political economy scholar, professor emeritus of Politics and International Affairs at the Woodrow Wilson School of Public and International Affairs at Princeton University, and American Academy of Arts and Sciences fellow
- Garance Genicot (M.A. 1997, Ph.D. 1999) – economics professor, Georgetown University
- Claudia Goldin (B.A. magna cum laude 1968) – economist and 2006 National Academy of Sciences member
- Sanjeev Goyal (M.A. 1989, Ph.D. 1990 economics) – economics professor, University of Cambridge, and British Academy fellow
- Elaine Hill (Ph.D. 2014) – health and environmental economist, professor at the University of Rochester
- Charles Henry Hull (1886) – economist, historian, and former dean of Cornell University's College of Arts
- Paul L. Joskow (B.A. 1968) – economist, distinguished fellow of the American Economic Association, Econometric Society, Industrial Organization Society, and American Academy of Arts and Sciences fellow, Elizabeth and James Killian Professor of Economics, emeritus at MIT, past department chair of MIT Department of Economics, and current president of the Alfred P. Sloan Foundation
- Ehud Kalai (M.S. 1971, Ph.D. 1972) – game theorist, mathematical economist, James J. O’Connor Distinguished Professor of Decision and Game Sciences at Northwestern University, and American Academy of Arts and Sciences and Econometric Society fellow
- Edwin W. Kemmerer (Ph.D. 1903) – economist at Princeton University who served as president of the American Economic Association (1926) – known internationally as one of the most prominent so-called money doctors, and 1934 American Academy of Arts and Sciences fellow
- Frank Knight (Ph.D. 1916) – economist and one of the original leaders of the "Chicago School" of economic theory
- John Williams Mellor (BSc 1950; MSc 1951; Ph.D.)
- Sendhil Mullainathan (B.A. 1993) – behavioral economist at Harvard University, co-founder of MIT Poverty Action Lab, MacArthur Foundation "genius grant" recipient in 2002, and Infosys Prize recipient in 2018
- Edwin Griswold Nourse (1906) – agricultural economist, first chairman of the US Council of Economic Advisers, former president of the American Economic Association, Brookings Institution vice president, Guggenheim Fellow, and 1934 American Academy of Arts and Sciences fellow
- Jack A. Roth (B.A 1967) – physician-scientist, thoracic surgeon
- Thorstein Veblen (graduate study 1891–92, transferred) – economist and author, The Theory of the Leisure Class

=== History ===
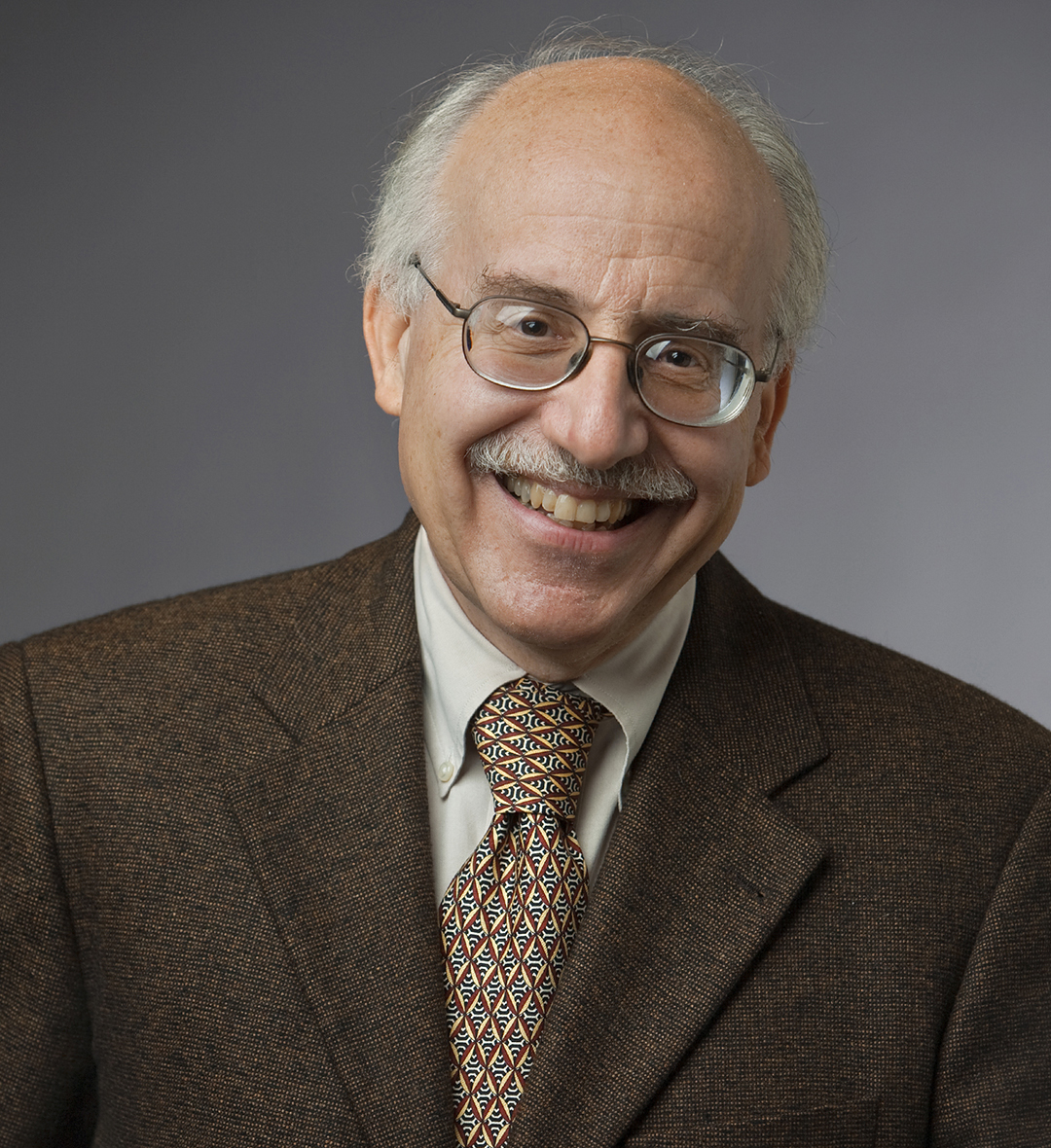
Glenn C. Altschuler

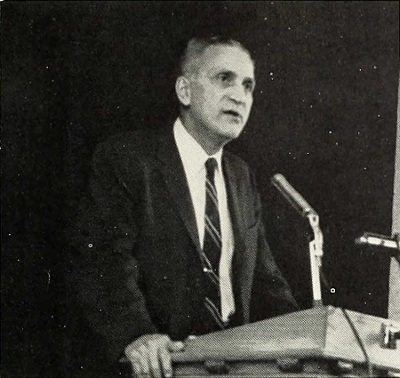
Louis R. Gottschalk

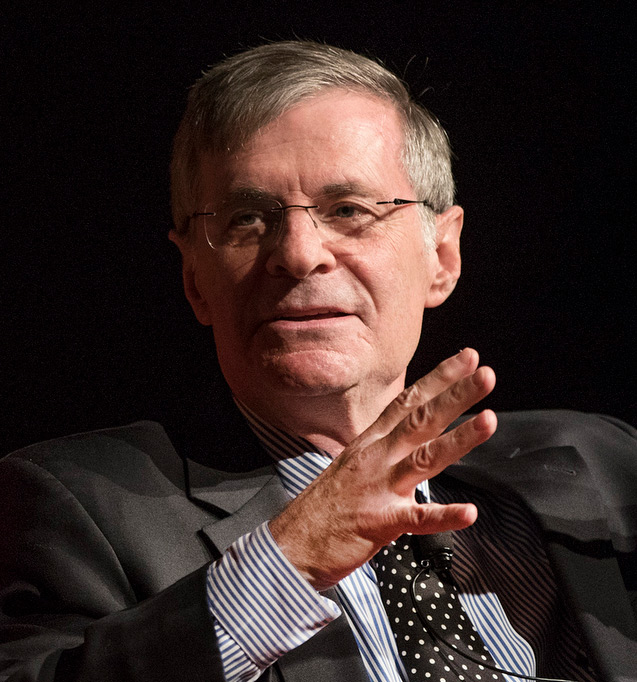
David Oshinsky

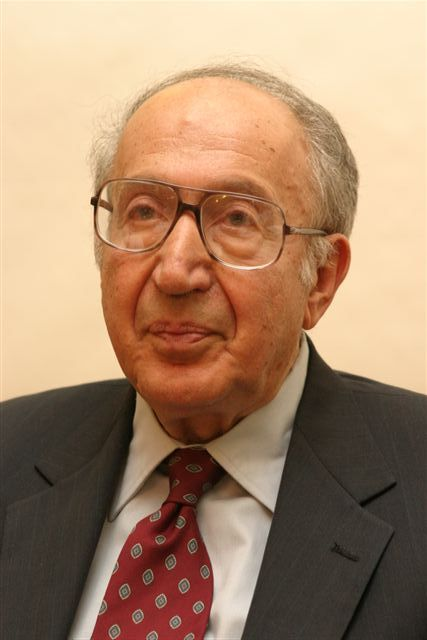
Richard Pipes

- Glenn C. Altschuler (Ph.D. 1976) – Thomas and Dorothy Litwin Professor of American Studies and vice president for University Relations at Cornell University
- Barbara Watson Andaya (Ph.D. 1975) – professor of Asian studies at the University of Hawaii and director of the Center for Southeast Asian Studies
- Leonard Andaya (Ph.D. 1972) – professor of Southeast Asian history at the University of Hawaii
- John L. Brooke (B.A. 1975) – Arts & Sciences Distinguished Professor of History at Ohio State University; recipient of Bancroft Prize (1995)
- Edward Countryman (M.A. 1969, Ph.D. 1971) – historian and educator; recipient of Bancroft Prize (1982)
- Nancy F. Cott (B.A. 1967) – historian, Sterling Professor of History and American Studies at Yale University and Jonathan Trumbull Professor of American History at Harvard University; member of the American Academy of Arts and Sciences
- Charlotte J. Erickson (M.A. 1947, Ph.D. 1951) – Paul Mellon Professor of American History at the University of Cambridge (1983–1990); MacArthur Fellow (1990) and Guggenheim Fellow (1966–1967)
- Louis R. Gottschalk (A.B. 1919, A.M. 1920, Ph.D. 1921) – professor of history (1927–1965), department chair (1937–1942), Gustavus F. and Ann M. Swift Distinguished Service Professor of History (1959–1965) at the University of Chicago
- Henry Guerlac (B.A. 1932 chemistry, M.A. 1933 biochemistry) – historian of science considered among the pioneers in the development of the academic field of the history of science; president of the History of Science Society (1957–1960), recipient of the George Sarton Medal (1973)
- Marie Boas Hall (Ph.D. 1949) – historian of science; fellow of the American Academy of Arts and Sciences (1955) and of the British Academy (1994), recipient of the George Sarton Medal (1981)
- Dominick LaCapra (B.A., faculty 1969–) – Bryce and Edith M. Bowmar Professor of Humanistic Studies at Cornell University; member of the American Academy of Arts and Sciences (2006)
- Frederic C. Lane (B.A. 1921) – historian in Medieval history, professor emeritus of history at Johns Hopkins University; president of the American Historical Association (1964–1965); fellow of the American Academy of Arts and Sciences and of the Medieval Academy of America
- Melvyn P. Leffler (B.S. 1966) – Edward Stettinius Professor and former chairman of the Department of History, dean of the college and Graduate School of Arts & Sciences at the University of Virginia; recipient of the George Louis Beer Prize (2008) and Bancroft Prize (1993)
- William Leuchtenburg (B.A. 1943) – historian, William Rand Kenan Jr. professor emeritus of history at the University of North Carolina at Chapel Hill; recipient of Bancroft Prize and North Carolina Award for Literature
- William H. McNeill (Ph.D. 1947) – professor emeritus of History at the University of Chicago; author of The Rise of the West: A History of the Human Community; recipient of the National Humanities Medal (2010)
- Anthony Milner (Ph.D.) – Basham Professor of Asian History, School of Culture, History & Language, Australian National University
- David Oshinsky (B.S. 1965, M.S. 1967) – historian, winner of the Pulitzer Prize for History in 2006 for his book Polio: An American Story, Jack S. Blanton Sr. Chair Emeritus in History at The University of Texas at Austin, Distinguished Scholar in Residence, New York University
- Milton Osborne (Ph.D.) – Australian historian, author, and consultant specializing in Southeast Asia
- Laura Otis (Ph.D. 1991 comparative literature) – historian of science and Professor of English at Emory University; MacArthur Fellow (2000)
- Richard Pipes (graduate of 1945) – historian in Russian history; fellow of the American Academy of Arts and Sciences; recipient of National Humanities Medal (2007)
- Merle Calvin Ricklefs (Ph.D.) – scholar of the history and current affairs of Indonesia
- Clinton Rossiter (1939; professor 1947–1970) – historian and political scientist; recipient of the Bancroft Prize (1954) and the Woodrow Wilson Foundation Award (1953)
- James Morton Smith (Ph.D. 1951) – historian; recipient of a Guggenheim Fellowship (1960); director of the Winterthur Museum, Garden and Library (1976–1984)
- Kazys Varnelis (M.A. 1990, Ph.D. 1994) – historian and theorist of architecture, specializing in network culture
- Olin Dunbar Wheeler (1874) – historian, author, topographer, wrote especially about the Lewis and Clark Expedition
- David K. Wyatt (Ph.D. 1966) – John Stambaugh Professor of History and Asian Studies, emeritus, Cornell University
- Mary E. Young (Ph.D. 1955) – professor emerita at the University of Rochester

=== Law ===
- Nina Appel – first female dean of Loyola Law School
- Boris Bittker (B.A. 1938) – Yale Law School professor emeritus and author

=== Philosophy ===
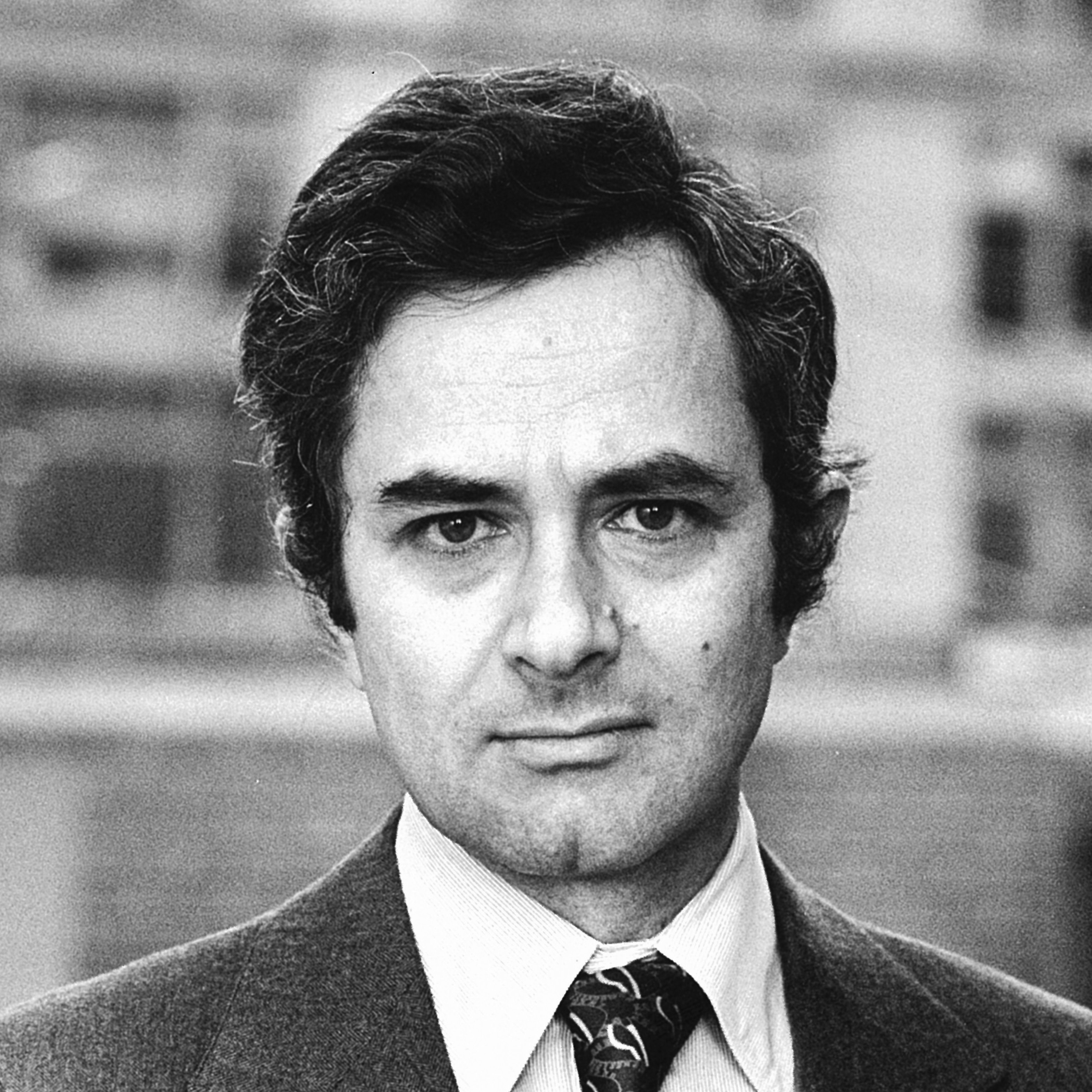
Thomas Nagel

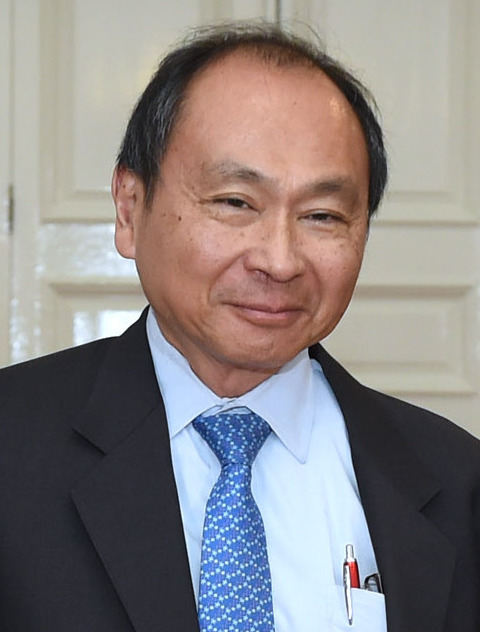
Francis Fukuyama

- Marilyn McCord Adams (Ph.D. 1967) – philosopher; Fellow of the American Academy of Arts & Sciences (2015)
- Francis Fukuyama (B.A.) – philosopher, political economist, and professor at Johns Hopkins University
- Edmund Gettier – philosopher and professor emeritus at the University of Massachusetts Amherst; owes his reputation to a single three-page paper published in 1963 called "Is Justified True Belief Knowledge?"
- Matthew Kramer (B.A. 1981, philosophy) – philosopher, professor of Legal and Political Philosophy at the University of Cambridge; fellow of the British Academy (2014); Guggenheim Fellow (2001–2002)
- John Warwick Montgomery (A.B. 1952) – lawyer, professor, theologian, and academic known for his work in the field of Christian apologetics
- Thomas Nagel (B.A. 1958) – philosopher, author of What is it like to be a bat? and Balzan Prize recipient (2008)
- Dominik Perler (visiting scholar 1991–1992) – professor of philosophy at the Humboldt University of Berlin; Gottfried Wilhelm Leibniz Prize recipient (2005)
- John Perry (Ph.D. 1968) – Henry Waldgrave Stuart Professor of Philosophy Emeritus at Stanford University and Distinguished Professor of Philosophy Emeritus at the University of California, Riverside; Jean Nicod Prize laureate (1999); member of the American Academy of Arts and Sciences (2002) and of the Norwegian Academy of Science and Letters
- David H. Sanford (Ph.D. 1966) – professor of philosophy at Duke University
- J. B. Schneewind (B.A.) – professor emeritus of Philosophy at Johns Hopkins University, former dean of the College of Arts and Sciences at the University of Pittsburgh and former provost of Hunter College CUNY; fellow of the American Academy of Arts and Sciences
- Samuel Weber (Ph.D. 1960) – Avalon Foundation Professor of Humanities at Northwestern University; professor at the European Graduate School in Saas-Fee, Switzerland
- Jessica Wilson (Ph.D. 2001) – professor of philosophy at the University of Toronto
- Paul Ziff (B.F.A. 1949, Ph.D. 1951) – artist and philosopher specializing in semantics and aesthetics

=== Political science ===
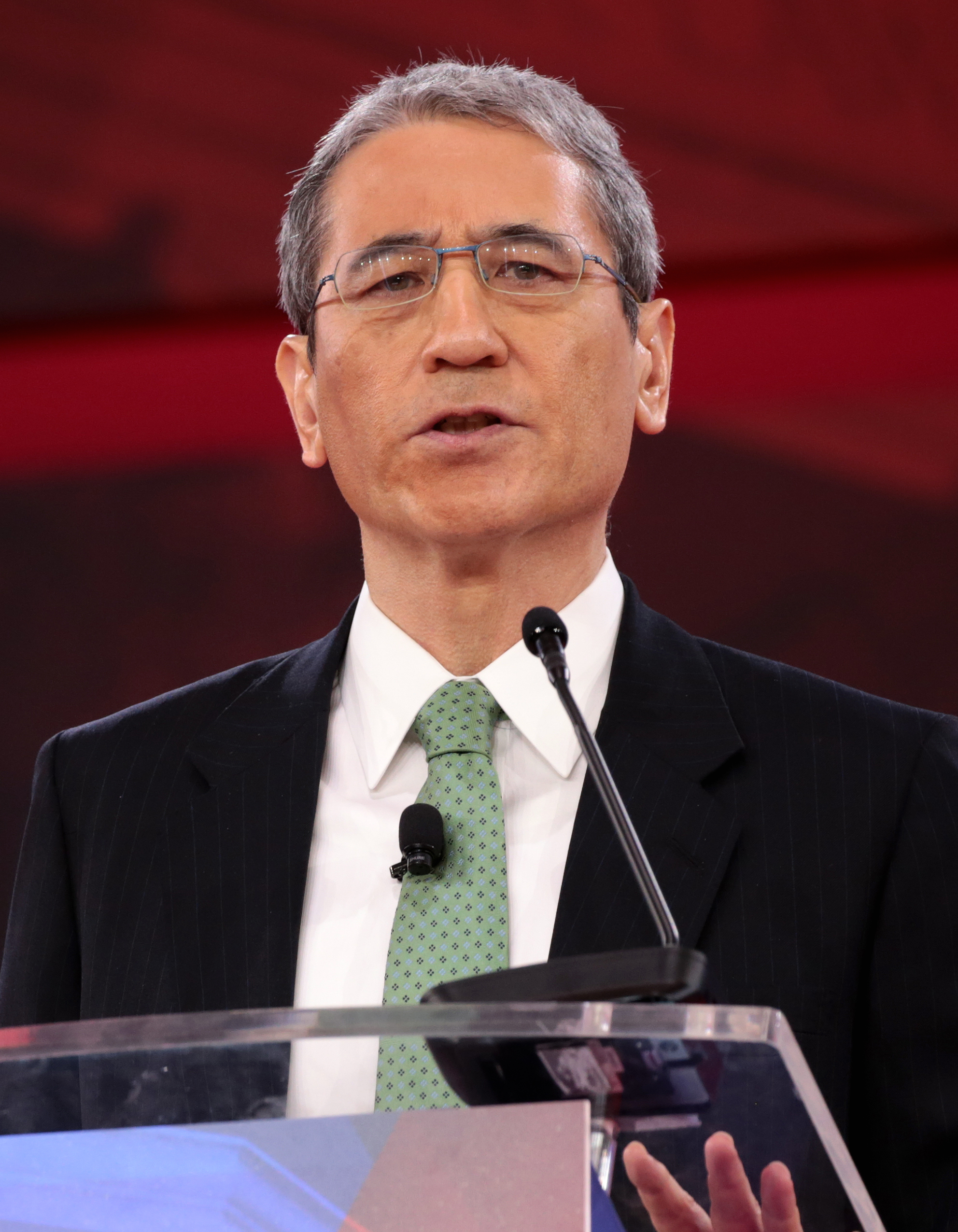
Gordon G. Chang

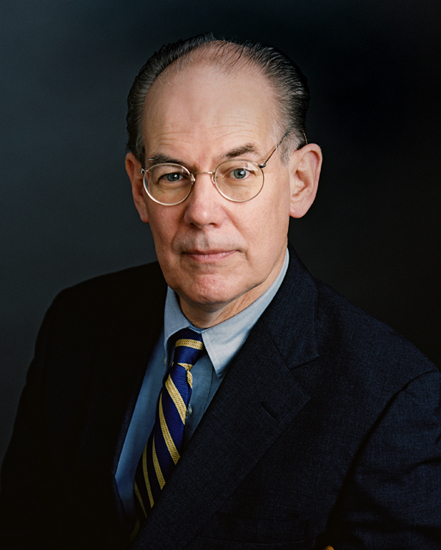
John Mearsheimer

- Benedict Anderson (Ph.D. 1967) – Aaron L. Binenkorb Professor Emeritus of International Studies, Government & Asian Studies at Cornell University; best known for his book Imagined Communities
- Gordon G. Chang (B.A. 1973, J.D. 1976) – author of The Coming Collapse of China and Nuclear Showdown: North Korea Takes On the World; one of the original set of student trustees
- George Friedman (Ph.D. 1976) – director of the political analysis and forecasting think tank Stratfor; author of The Next 100 Years: A Forecast for the 21st Century (2009)
- Everett Carll Ladd (Ph.D.) – political scientist; director of the Roper Center for Public Opinion Research at the University of Connecticut
- John Mearsheimer (Ph.D. 1980) – international relations theorist and professor of political science at University of Chicago
- Ruth McVey (Ph.D. 1961) – co-author, Cornell Paper
- Suzanne Mettler (Ph.D. 1994) – political scientist and author
- Lee Poh Ping (Ph.D. 1974) – political scientist at the University of Malaya; prominent contributor to the field of international relations and Japanese studies in Malaysia
- William Schonfeld (B.A. 1963) – political scientist, author, researcher, educator and university administrator
- Wang Shaoguang (Ph.D. 1990) – political scientist and leading member of the Chinese New Left; professor at Chinese University of Hong Kong
- Stephen Skowronek (Ph.D. 1979) – Pelatiah Perit Professor of political and social science at Yale University
- William Irwin Thompson (Ph.D. 1966; professor) – cultural historian, social critic, poet, philosopher of science

== Architecture and design ==
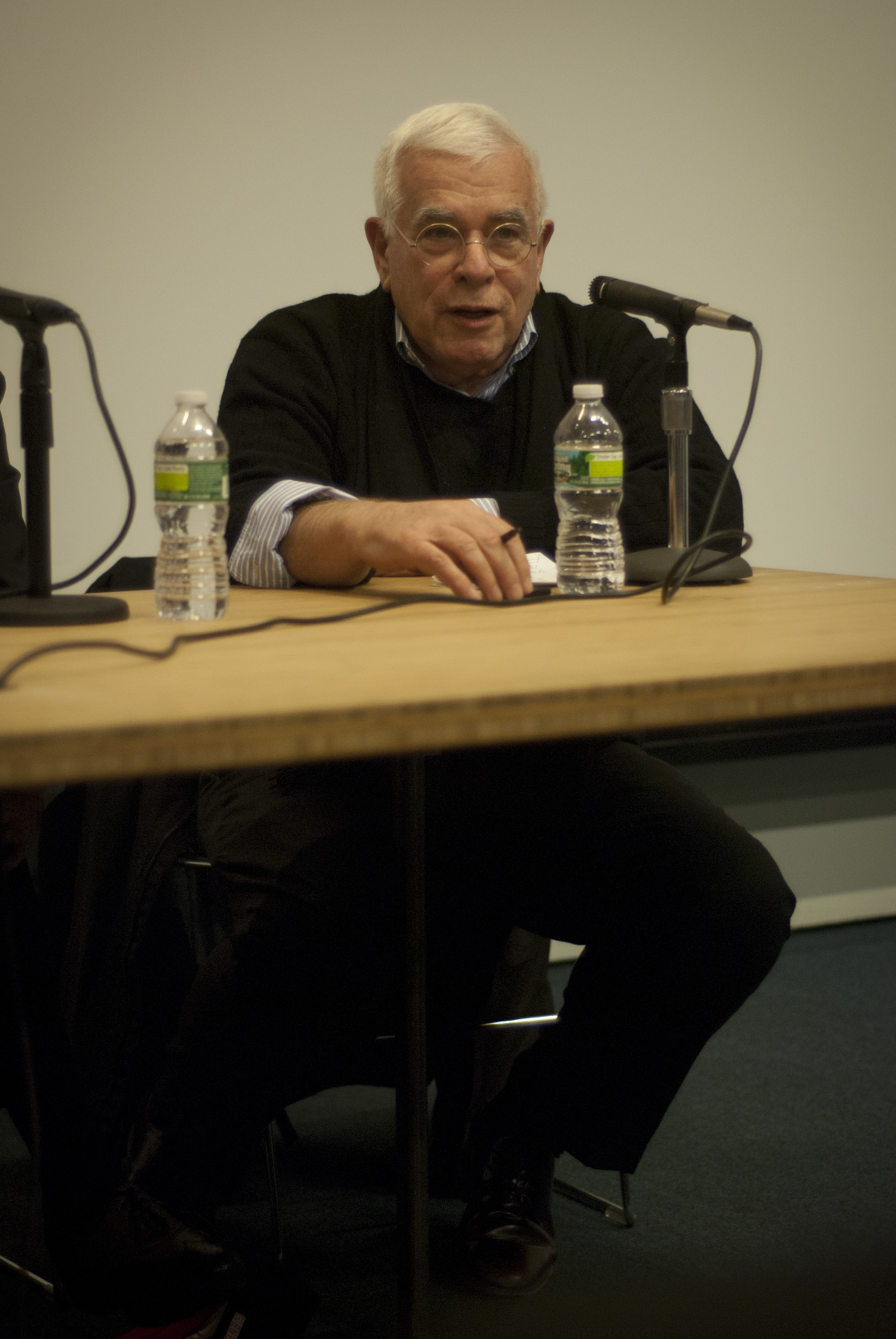
Peter Eisenman

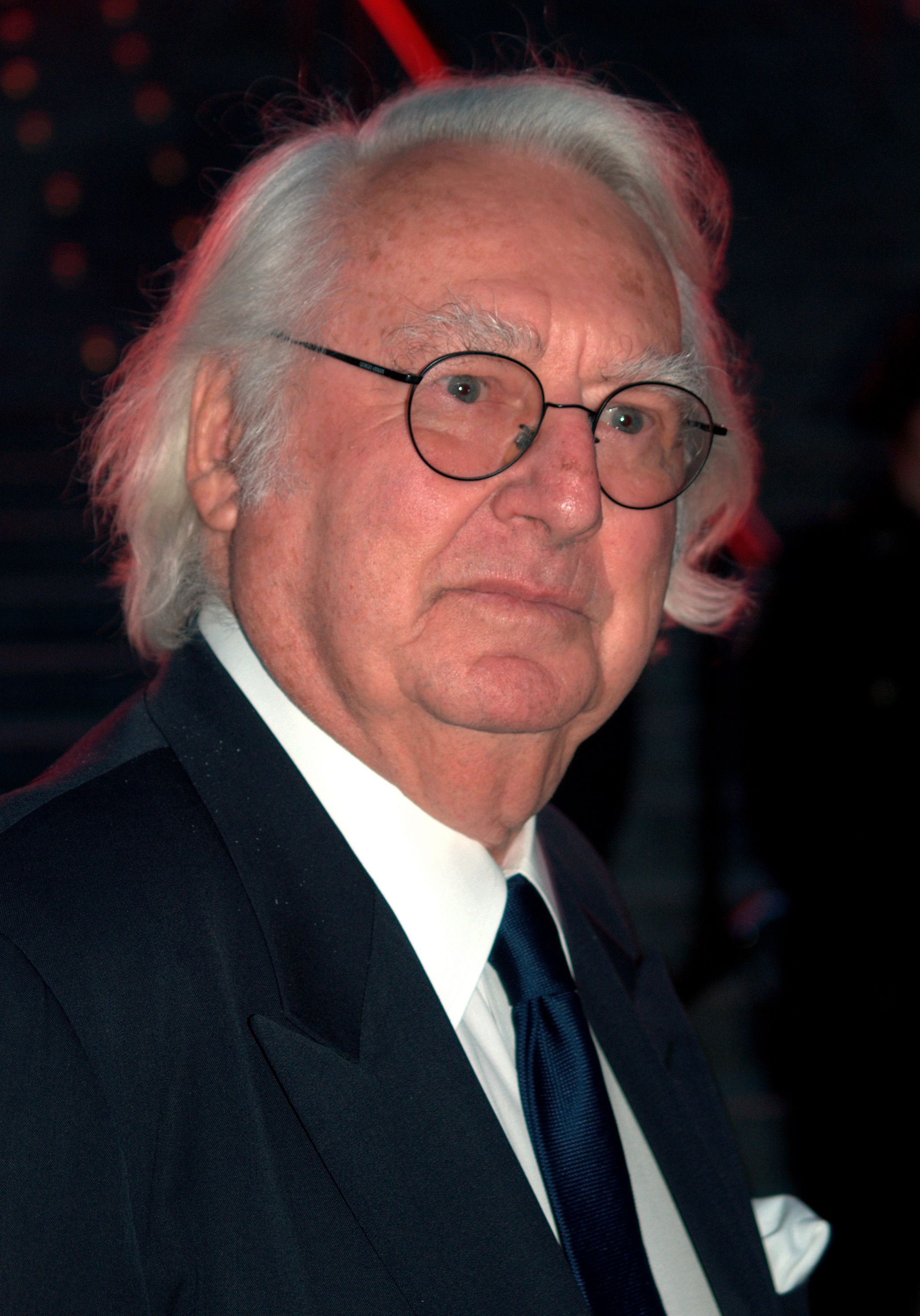
Richard Meier

- Frederick L. Ackerman (B.Arch. 1901) – architect and urban planner
- Raymond F. Almirall (1891) – architect of the Beaux-Arts period, practicing in New York City
- Edmund Bacon (B.Arch. 1932) – urban planner, reshaped Philadelphia, 1949–1970
- Pietro Belluschi (civil engineering grad) – architect, leader of Modernist architecture; dean of the architecture and planning school at the Massachusetts Institute of Technology (1951–1965); Fellow of the American Academy of Arts and Sciences and the American Institute of Architects; member of the National Academy of Design; recipient of AIA Gold Medal (1972), National Medal of Arts (1991)
- Morris Fuller Benton (engineering, 1896) – engineer and typeface designer
- George Burnap (MA, 1910) – landscape architect of Meridian Hill Park and the first White House Rose Garden in Washington, D.C.
- Albert Cassell (B.Arch. 1919) – designed buildings for Howard University, Morgan State University, and Virginia Union University
- Vishaan Chakrabarti (B.S. Operations Research & Industrial Engineering and B.A. History of Art 1988) – architect and dean of UC Berkeley's College of Environmental Design
- Peter H. Christensen – architectural historian
- Gilmore David Clarke (B.S. 1913 landscape architecture and civil engineering) – designed the Central Park Zoo and the Unisphere
- David Colleen – architect
- Kimberly Dowdell (B.Arch. 2006, trustee) – architect, real estate developer and educator; 100th president of the American Institute of Architects and first Black woman to serve in the role
- Peter Eisenman (B.Arch. 1955) – a foremost practitioner of deconstructivism in American architecture; Wolf Prize in Arts
- Frederick Earl Emmons (1907–1999) – architect
- Earl Flansburgh (B.Arch. 1954, trustee) – Cambridge, Massachusetts-based architect and designer of the Cornell Campus Store
- Ruth Reynolds Freeman (B.Arch. 1936) – architect; first female licensed architect in the state of Vermont
- Kathryn Gleason (B.S. Landscape architecture, 1979) – Cornell University landscape architect and archaeologist
- Edward Brodhead Green (1878) – Buffalo-based architect
- Jerome F. Hajjar – civil engineer, member of the National Academy of Engineering
- Lawrence Halprin (B.A.) – landscape architect, designer, and teacher; recipient of National Medal of Arts (2002)
- Margaret Hicks (B.Arch. 1880) – first female architectural school graduate at Cornell
- Douglas Honnold (1901–1974) – architect
- Emmett J. Hull (1906) – architect
- William B. Ittner (1887) – St. Louis-based architect and designer of school buildings
- Lee S. Jablin (B.Arch. 1971) – founding partner of Harman Jablin Architects
- Robert Trent Jones (1931) – designer of about 500 golf courses
- Henri Jova (1949) – architect, key figure in redevelopment of Midtown Atlanta
- Raymond M. Kennedy (B.Arch. 1915, M.Arch. 1916) – designed Grauman's Chinese Theatre
- Rem Koolhaas (M.Arch.) – Dutch architect, journalist, and screenwriter, Pritzker Architecture Prize winner
- David Macpherson (civil engineering) – city planner for San Antonio, Texas; designed the Santa Fe Railroad
- Khaled Malas (M.Arch.) – architect and art historian
- Tomás Mapúa (B.Arch. 1911) – founded the Mapúa Institute of Technology; first Filipino to earn a degree in architecture
- Peter Marino (1971) – designer of boutique stores for luxury brands, and private residences for wealthy individuals
- Richard Meier (B.Arch. 1957, professor) – Pritzker Architecture Prize, AIA Gold Medal winner
- William Henry Miller (B.Arch. 1872) – designed many iconic buildings on Cornell's Ithaca campus
- Enrique Norten (M.Arch. 1980) – Mexican architect, professor, 2003 World Trade Center Site Memorial Competition jury member
- Nathaniel A. Owings (B.Arch. 1927) – founding partner of Skidmore, Owings and Merrill which popularized the International style after World War II
- Horace Peaslee (B.Arch, 1910) – landscape architect
- Emmanuel Pratt (B.Arch. 1999) – MacArthur Fellow (2019)
- Frederick Roehrig (1883 architecture) – early 20th-century architect known for landmark buildings in Pasadena, California, including the Hotel Green
- Richmond Shreve (B.Arch.) – partner of architectural firm Shreve, Lamb and Harmon, which designed the Empire State Building
- Charles Morse Stotz (B.Arch. 1921, master's degree) – architect, historian, and preservationist of Western Pennsylvania
- Vertner Woodson Tandy (MArch) – architect, Villa Lewaro, the mansion of Harlem millionairess Madam C.J. Walker; co-founder of Alpha Phi Alpha fraternity
- Olive Frances Tjaden (B.Arch. 1925) pioneering woman architect; donor and namesake of Tjaden Hall
- Jan V. White (B.Arch. 1951) – communication designer, educator and writer
- Philip Will Jr. (B.Arch. 1928) – a founding partner of Perkins and Will, designer of seven buildings on the Engineering Quad
- E. Stewart Williams (B.Arch. 1932) – Palm Springs, California-based architect with a distinctive modernist style
- David Williston (B.A. 1898) – first professionally trained African American landscape architect in the United States
- Helen Binkerd Young (B.Arch. 1900) – architect and lecturer
- Ricardo Zurita (B.Arch. 1984) – architect and designer of urban public projects

== Art ==
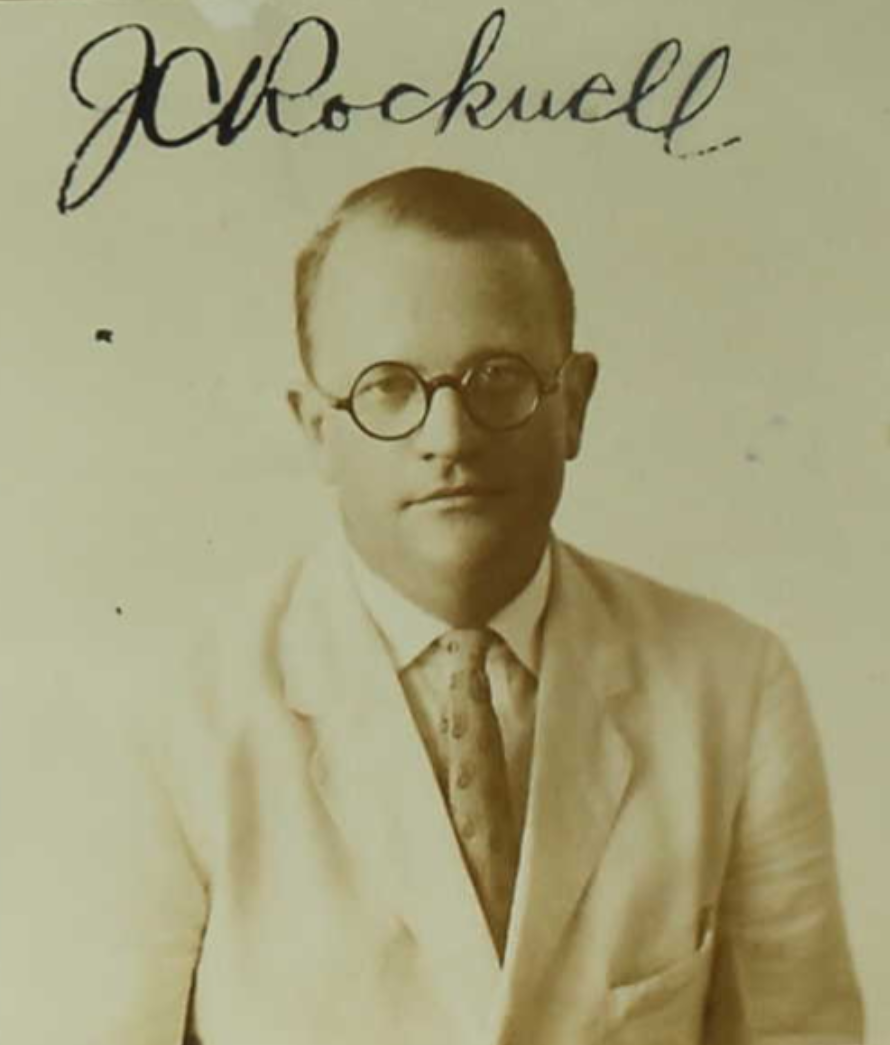
James Rockwell

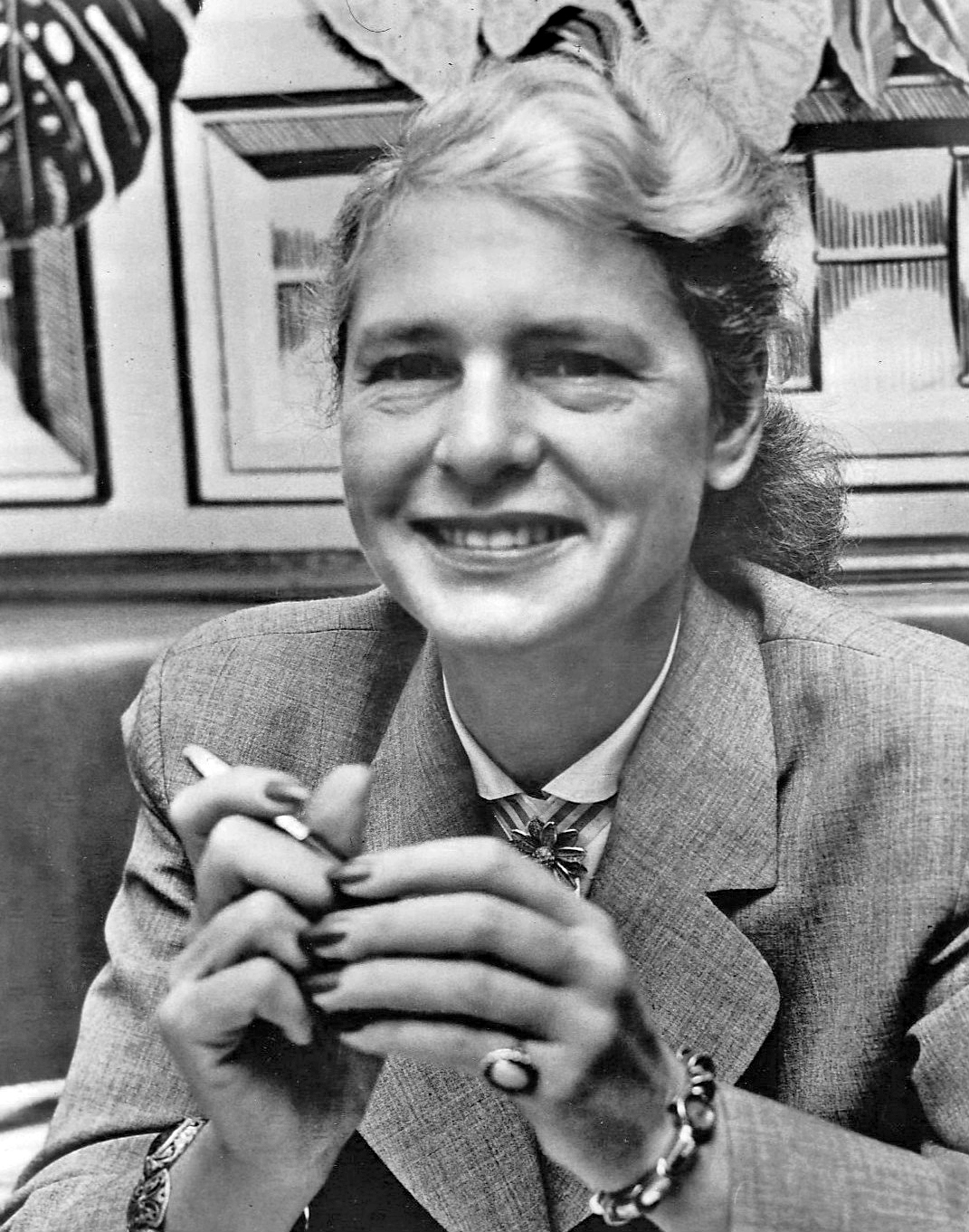
Margaret Bourke-White

- Elfriede Abbe (1940) – sculptor
- Richard Artschwager (1948) – sculptor, painter
- Margaret Bourke-White (B.A. 1927) – photojournalist
- Joan Danziger (B.F.A) – sculptor
- James De La Vega (B.F.A. 1994) – muralist, street artist in Harlem, New York
- Arthur Dove (1903) – first abstract expressionist painter in the US
- Louise Lawler (B.F.A. 1969) – artist and photographer; member of the American Academy of Arts and Sciences (2019)
- Pat Lipsky (B.F.A. 1963) – painter
- Cabot Lyford (B.F.A. 1950) – sculptor
- Jill Magid (B.F.A. 1995) – performance artist
- Enrique Martinez Celaya (B.S. applied & engineering physics, 1986) – artist
- Amanda Means (B.A. 1969)– artist and photographer
- James Rockwell (B.S. 1904 engineering) – architect and president of Meralco
- John Rosenbaum (M.E.P. 1957) – kinetic artist and educator
- Susan Rothenberg (B.F.A. 1967) – painter
- Jason Seley (B.F.A. 1940) – sculptor
- Monir Shahroudy Farmanfarmaian (1948–1951) – contemporary Iranian artist
- Frederick Sommer (M.A. 1927 landscape architecture) – photographer
- Beth Ames Swartz (BSc 1957) – artist
- Hugh Troy (B.A. 1922–1927, did not graduate) – artist and famous prankster
- Harold Wethey (B.A. 1923) – art historian

== Authors and writers ==
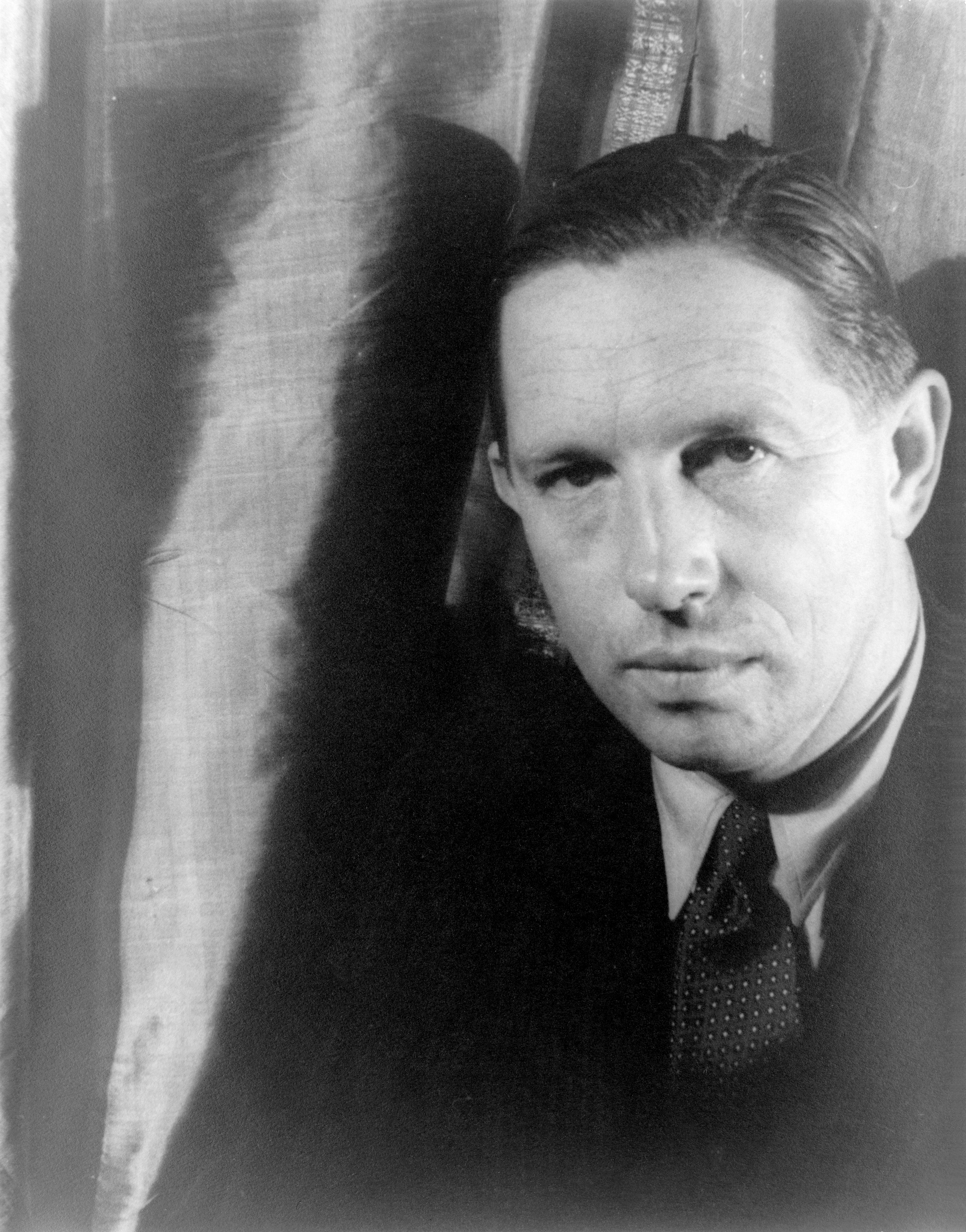
Louis Bromfield

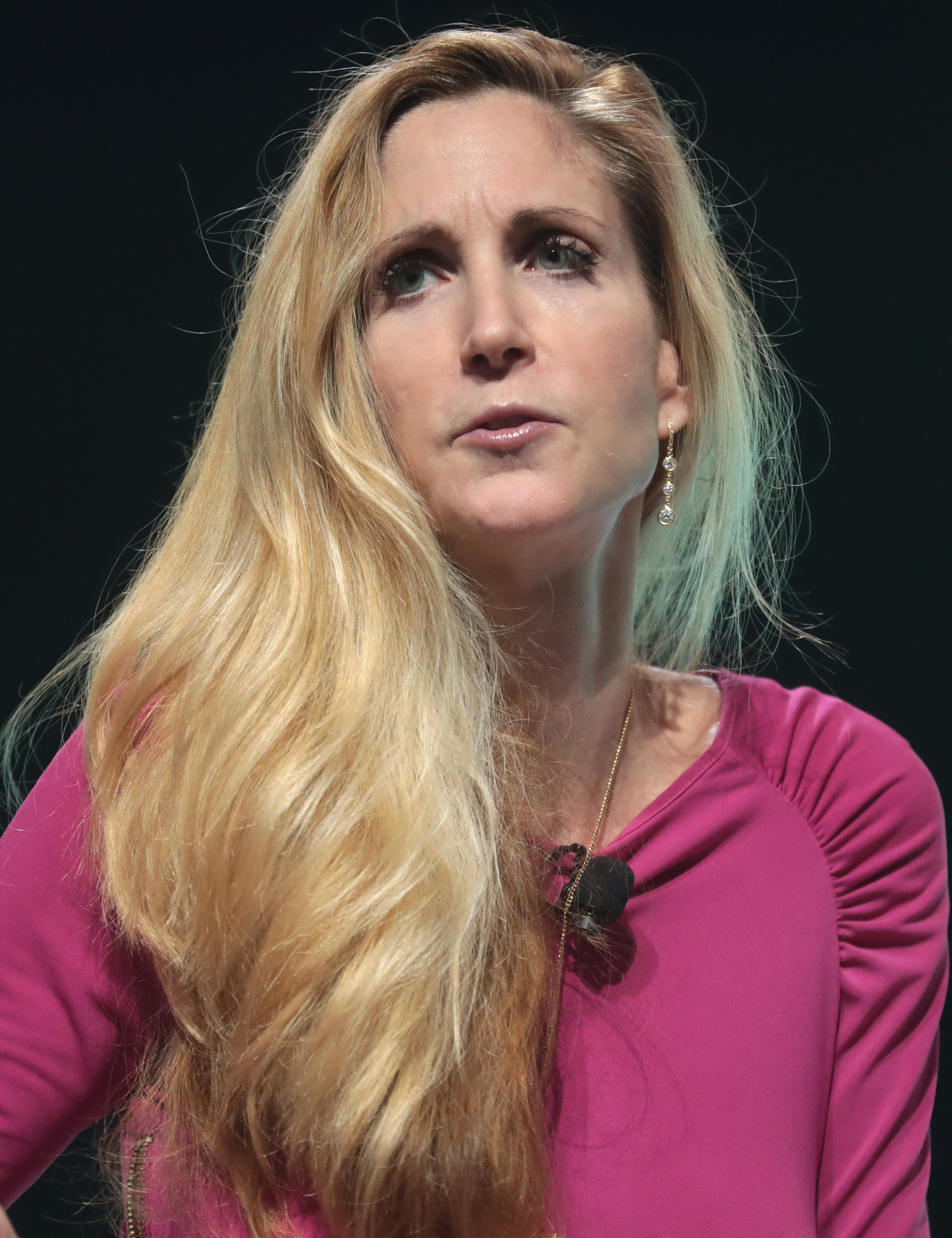
Ann Coulter

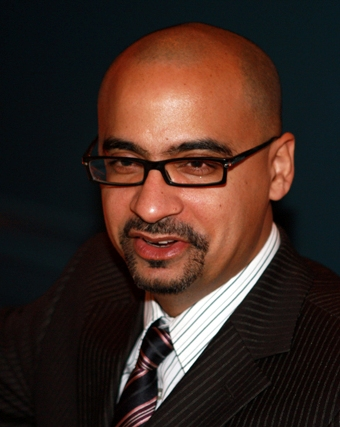
Junot Díaz

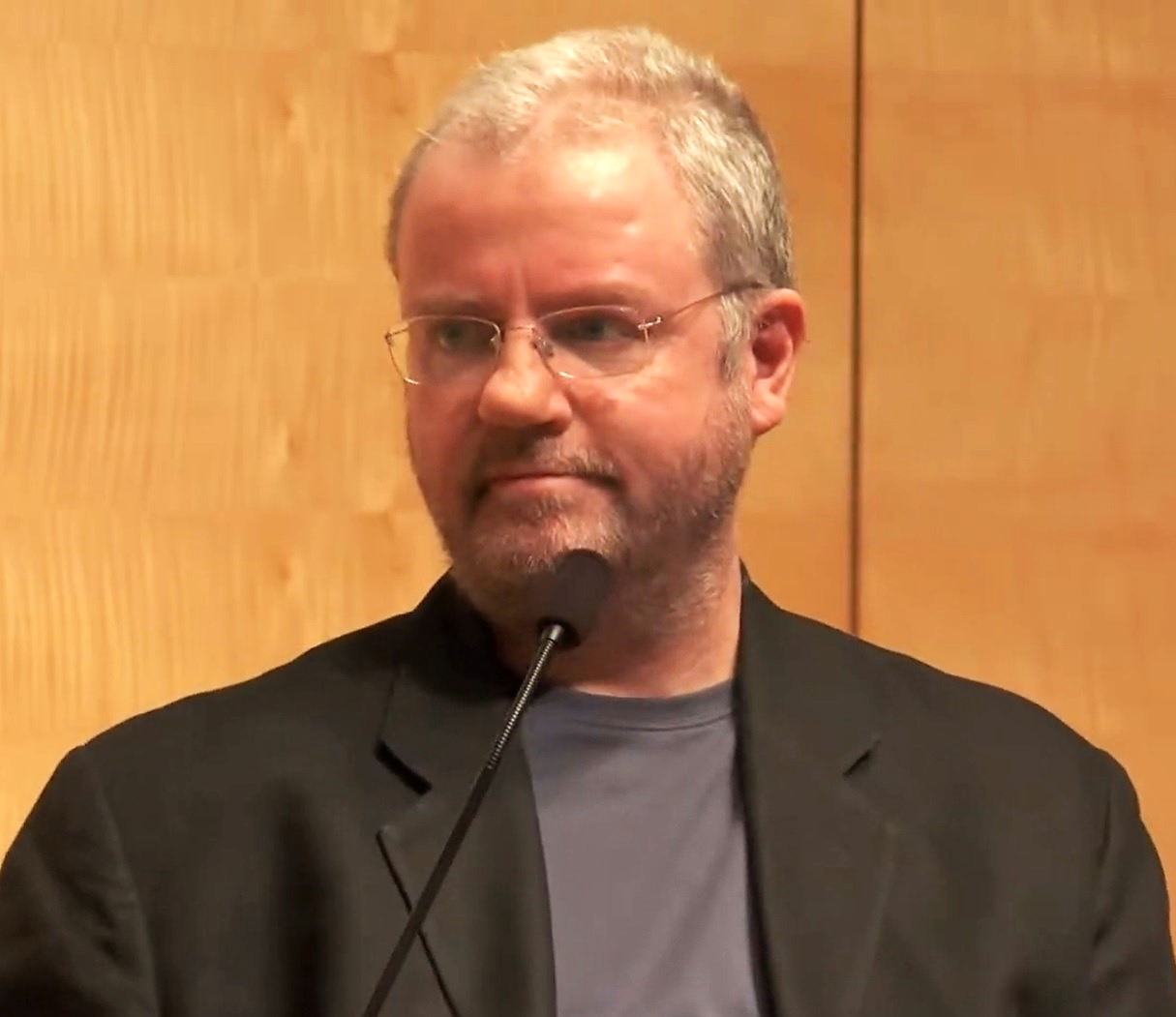
Matt Ruff

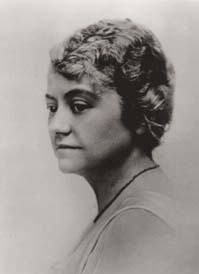
Elsie Singmaster

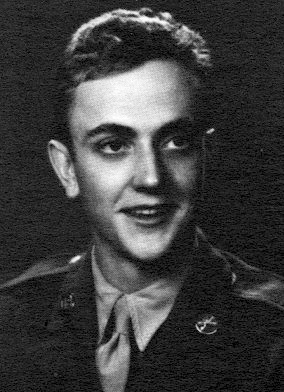
Kurt Vonnegut

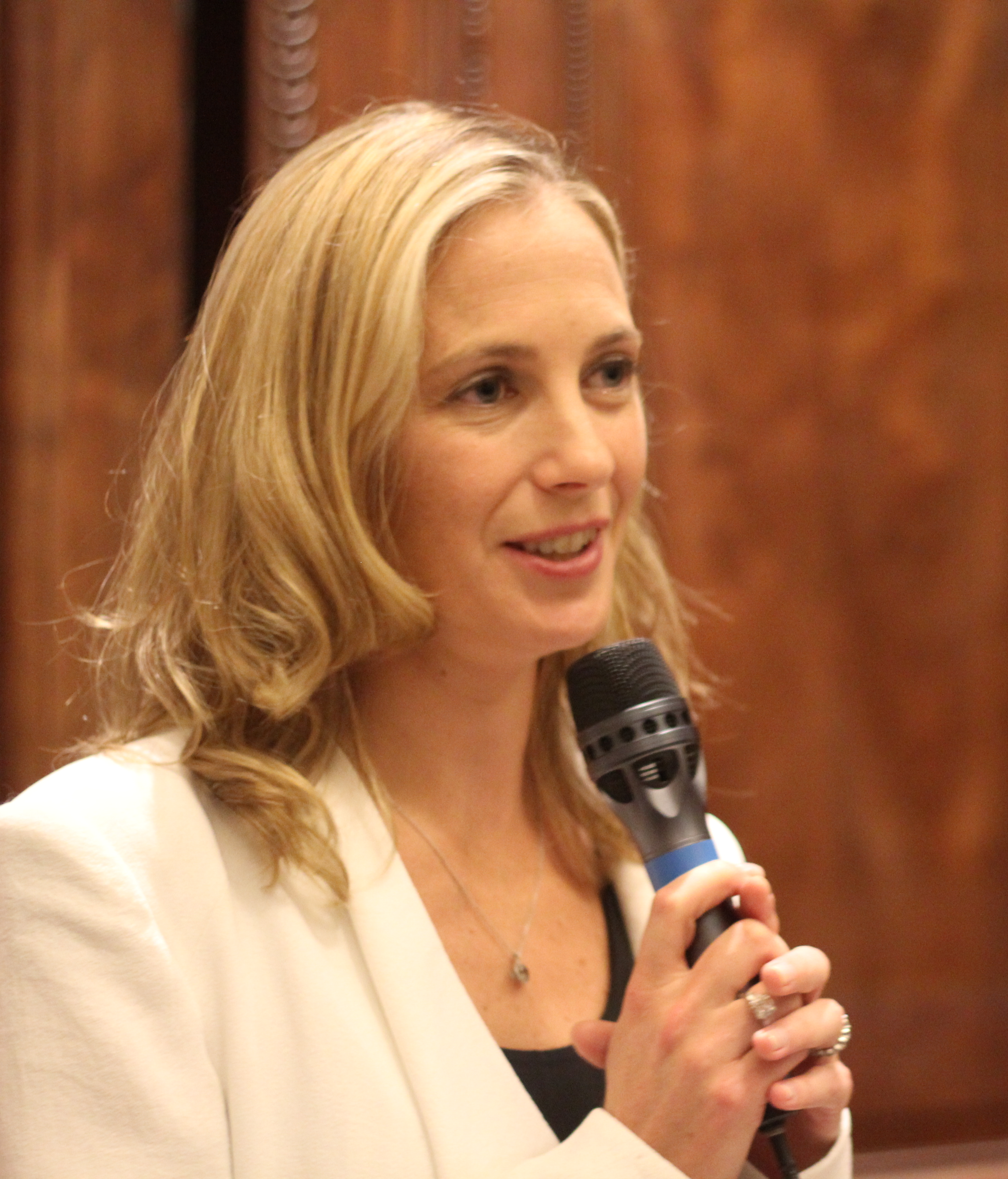
Lauren Weisberger

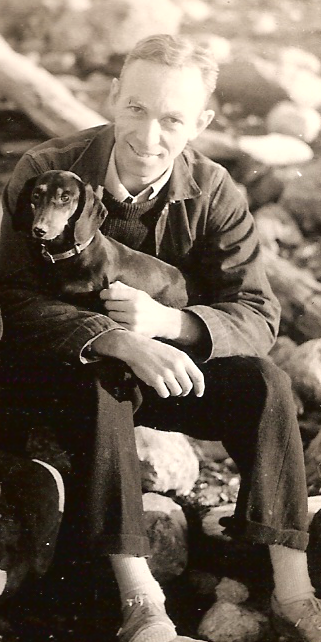
E. B. White

- Diane Ackerman (M.F.A. 1973 poetry, M.A. 1976, Ph.D. 1978) – author, poet, and naturalist
- Taiaiake Alfred (M.S. 1992, Ph.D. 1994) – scholar, author, and adviser to indigenous nations
- Solvej Balle (non-matriculated, 1990) – Danish author of On the Calculation of Volume novel series
- Melissa Bank (M.F.A. 1998) – best-selling author; The Girls' Guide to Hunting and Fishing, a bestseller in both the United States and the United Kingdom, and The Wonder Spot, a novel, have been translated into over thirty languages
- Edward Bernays (B.S. 1912 agriculture) – public relations practitioner, author of Propaganda
- Morris Bishop (B.A. 1913, M.A. 1914, Ph.D. 1926; professor of Romance Literature) – biographer, author, humorist, wrote the preeminent history of the university, A History of Cornell
- Ken Blanchard (B.A. 1961, Ph.D. 1967) – management consultant, co-author of The One Minute Manager
- Harold Bloom (B.A. 1951) – literary and cultural scholar-critic; Sterling Professor of Humanities at Yale University; MacArthur Fellow (1985)
- Susan Brownmiller (B.A. 1956) – feminist author and activist
- Louis Bromfield (1914–1916 agriculture) – Pulitzer Prize winner for best novel for Early Autumn (1927) and pioneer of innovative scientific farming concepts
- Pearl S. Buck (M.F.A. 1924) – author, novelist, and winner of the Pulitzer Prize in 1932 and Nobel Prize in Literature in 1938
- NoViolet Bulawayo (M.F.A. 2010) – Zimbabwean author of We Need New Names
- Murray Burnett (B.A. 1931) – author of the play Everybody Comes to Rick's, which was turned into the film Casablanca
- George Lincoln Burr (B.A. 1881; John Stambaugh Professor of History 1888–?) – U.S. historian, diplomat, author, and educator
- Fiona Cheong (B.A. English; M.F.A. Creative Writing) – author of The Scent of the Gods, nominated for a National Book Award (1991)
- George Cockcroft (B.A. 1954) – author, The Dice Man; uses the pen name Luke Rhinehart
- Ann Coulter (B.A. 1984 history) – book author and columnist
- Junot Díaz (M.F.A. 1995) – critically acclaimed, Pulitzer Prize-winning short-story writer; MacArthur Fellowship (2012)
- Alice Dunbar-Nelson (attended 1907–1908) – poet, journalist, political activist, Harlem Renaissance influence
- Jane Duran – Cuban-born poet, recipient of the Forward Poetry Prize (1995) and the Cholmondeley Award (2005)
- Barry Eisler (J.D. 1989) – author, novelist
- Sarah Elbert (B.A 1965, M.A 1966, Ph.D. 1974) – scholar
- Richard Fariña (B.A. 1962 English) – author, Been Down So Long It Looks Like Up to Me; folk singer
- Jessie Redmon Fauset (B.A. 1905) – author from the Harlem Renaissance
- Nick Fowler (B.A. 1989) – musician, poet, author, A Thing (or Two) About Curtis and Camilla
- Alice Fulton (M.F.A. 1982; Ann S. Bowers Distinguished Professor of English) – poet, author, feminist, MacArthur Fellow (1991)
- William H. Gass (Ph.D. 1954 philosophy) – author, essayist
- Olakunle George (M.A., PhD English), researcher and professor of English and Africana Studies at Brown University
- C. S. Giscombe (M.F.A. 1975) – poet and professor of English at University of California, Berkeley; recipient of American Book Award for Prairie Style (2008)
- Jon Gordon (B.A.) – author of The Energy Bus
- Martin Hägglund (Ph.D. 2009 comparative literature) – literary theorist, philosopher
- Lynne Hanley (B.A. English) – literary critic
- E. D. Hirsch (B.A., 1950) – literary critic and educational theorist
- Laura Howes (B.A. English) – scholar of Middle English literature
- Minfong Ho (B.A. Economics) – Chinese-American author
- Laura Z. Hobson – author, Gentleman's Agreement
- Clifford Irving (B.A. 1951) – author of the Howard Hughes biography hoax
- Brenda Janowitz (1995) – fiction author and attorney
- Michelle Knudsen (B.A. 1995 English) – New York Times best-selling American author of 47 books for young readers
- Loren Kruger (Ph.D comparative literature) – academic studying literature, theater, and performing arts
- Anne LaBastille (B.A. 1955, Ph.D. 1969) – author and award-winning conservationist
- Jean Lee Latham (B.A., M.A.) – writer specialized in biographies for children or young adults and Newbery Medal recipient (1956) for her book Carry On, Mr. Bowditch
- Victor LaValle (B.A. English) – author
- Robert Marantz (B.A. English) – Author of The Ring of McAllister
- Philipp Meyer (B.A. English) – fiction writer and author of American Rust and The Son
- James H. Morey (M.A. 1987, Ph.D. 1990) – Medievalist and professor of English at Emory University
- Toni Morrison (M.A. 1955 M) – best-selling author, The Bluest Eye and Beloved; Nobel Prize in Literature, Presidential Medal of Freedom
- Lorrie Moore (M.F.A. 1982) – prize-winning short-story writer and novelist
- Manuel Muñoz (M.F.A. 1998) – author and professor of creative writing
- Ira Nadel (Ph.D. 1970) – biographer and literary critic
- John Naisbitt (graduate study) – best-selling writer in the area of futures studies
- George Jean Nathan (1904) – author, critic
- Iddo Netanyahu (did not graduate) – Israeli physician, author and playwright; younger brother of Benjamin Netanyahu
- Nicholas Nicastro (B.A. 1985 English, M.A. 1991 archaeology, Ph.D. 2003 psychology) – historical novelist
- Téa Obreht (MFA 2009) – novelist, The Tiger's Wife
- Stewart O'Nan (MFA 1992) – novelist, Drue Heinz Literature Prize-winning author for In the Walled City in 1993, author of Snow Angels
- Julie Orringer (B.A. 1994 English) – short-story writer and novelist
- Thomas Perry (B.A. 1969) – novelist, Edgar Award winner
- Darryl Ponicsan (M.A. 1965) – writer best known as the author of the 1971 novel The Last Detail
- Seksan Prasertkul (M.A., Ph.D. 1989 political science) – Thai author, National Artist of Thailand (literature)
- Michael Punke (J.D. 1989) – author of The Revenant: A Novel of Revenge, adapted as the film The Revenant (2015)
- Thomas Pynchon (B.A. 1959 English) – author, Gravity's Rainbow and Mason & Dixon; MacArthur Fellow (1988)
- Kenneth Roberts (B.A. 1908) – novelist, Northwest Passage
- Laura Riding (attended 1918–21) – poet, novelist, essayist, short story writer, and leader in modernism
- Matt Ruff (B.A. 1988) – author, Fool on the Hill
- Joanna Russ (B.A. 1957 English; professor) – feminist author, The Female Man
- Ira Sadoff (B.S. 1966 ILR) – poet, novelist, critic, True Faith 2012, Grazing 1999, Barter 2003
- Kirkpatrick Sale (B.A. 1958 history) – independent scholar and author
- Eve Kosofsky Sedgwick (undergrad) – critical theorist, literature professor
- Elsie Singmaster – author, Swords of Steel, and 1934 Newbery Medal recipient
- Gayatri Chakravorty Spivak (Ph.D. 1967 comparative literature) – post-colonialist theorist, author, Can the Subaltern Speak?, winner of Kyoto Prize in Arts and Philosophy, and Columbia University professor
- Ellen Stekert, folklorist and folk musician
- William Stokoe (B.A. 1941, Ph.D. 1946 English) – pioneer researcher on American Sign Language; co-author of A Dictionary of American Sign Language on Linguistic Principles, the first attempt to systematically represent and characterize ASL phonology; Stokoe notation creator
- William Strunk Jr. (Ph.D. 1896; professor) – co-author, The Elements of Style
- Hendrik Willem van Loon (1905; professor of History 1915–17) – author of the first book to be awarded the Newbery Medal for an outstanding contribution to children's literature
- William T. Vollmann (B.A., Comparative Literature, 1977) – novelist, journalist, war correspondent, short story writer, and essayist
- Kurt Vonnegut (undergrad 1941–1944) – author, Slaughterhouse-Five, Cat's Cradle, and Breakfast of Champions
- James Weinstein (B.A. 1949 government) – author and publisher, In These Times
- Lauren Weisberger (B.A. 1999 English) – author, The Devil Wears Prada and Everyone Worth Knowing
- E. B. White (B.A. 1921) – author, Charlotte's Web and Stuart Little, and co-author, The Elements of Style
- Nicola Yoon (B.S. 1994 Electrical Engineering) – novelist, Everything, Everything and The Sun Is Also a Star

== Business ==
=== Founders ===
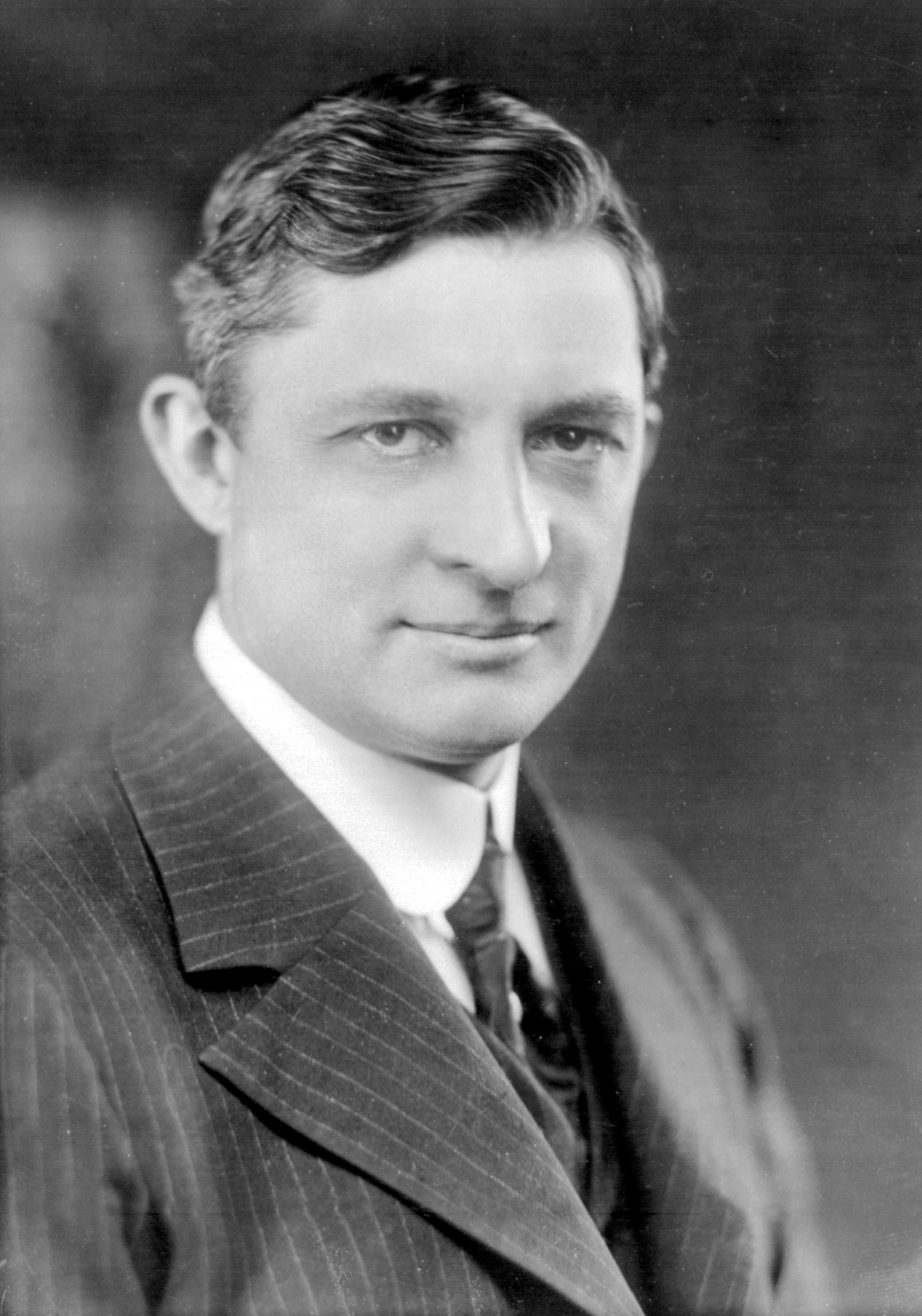
Willis Carrier

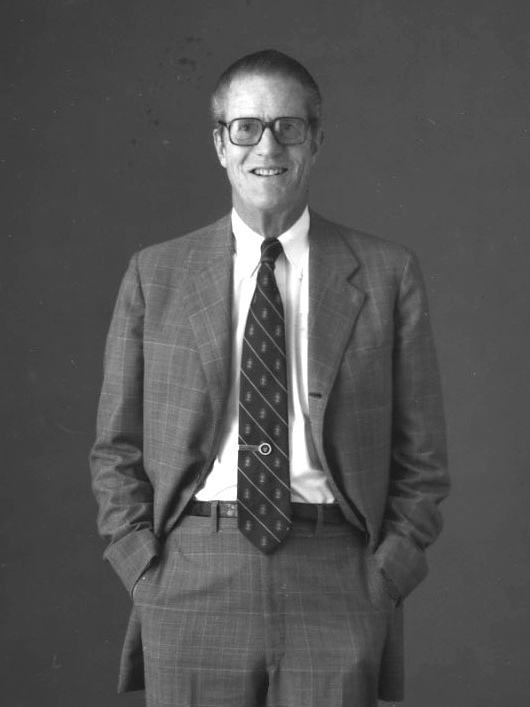
Joseph Coors

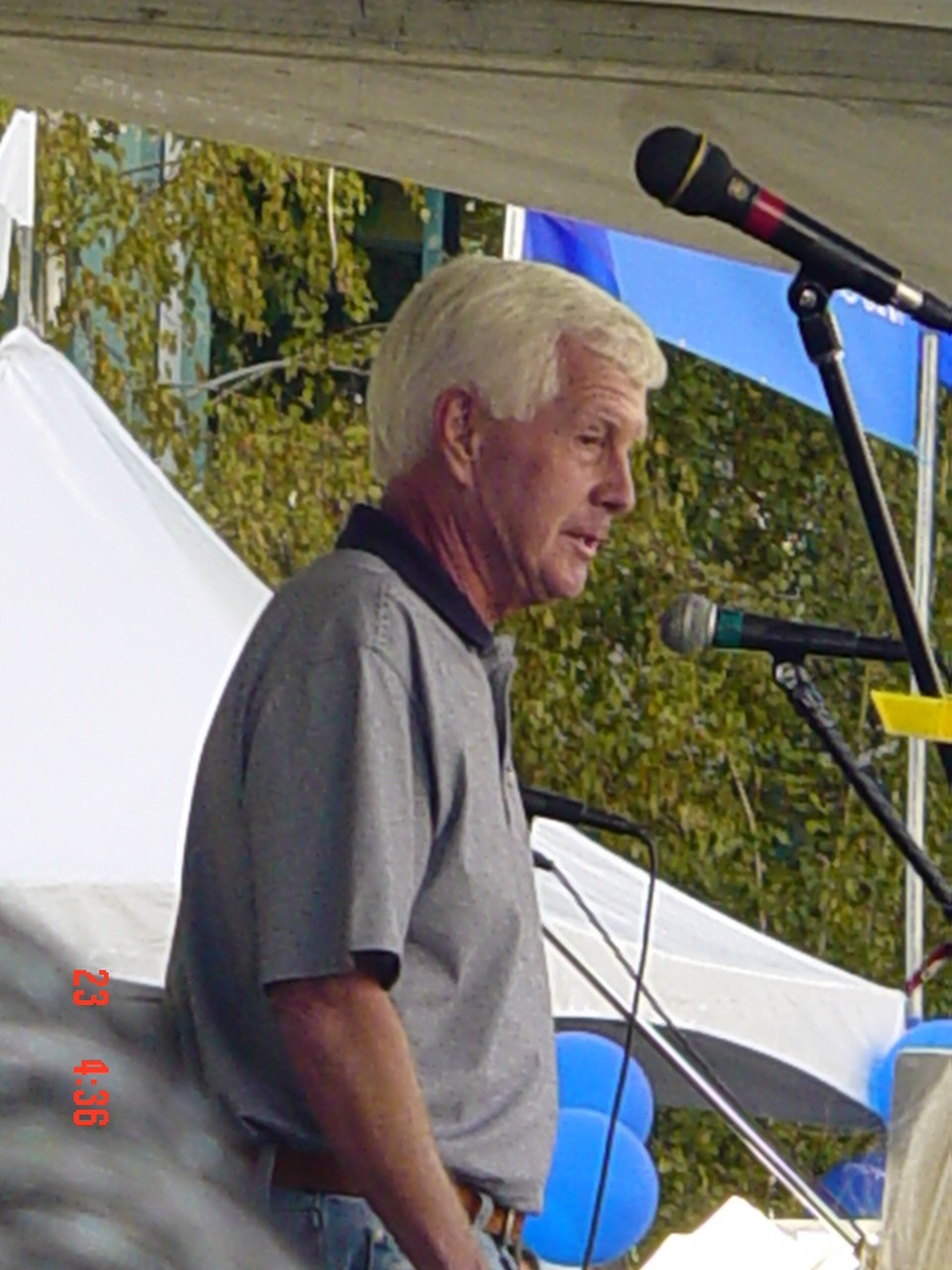
David Duffield

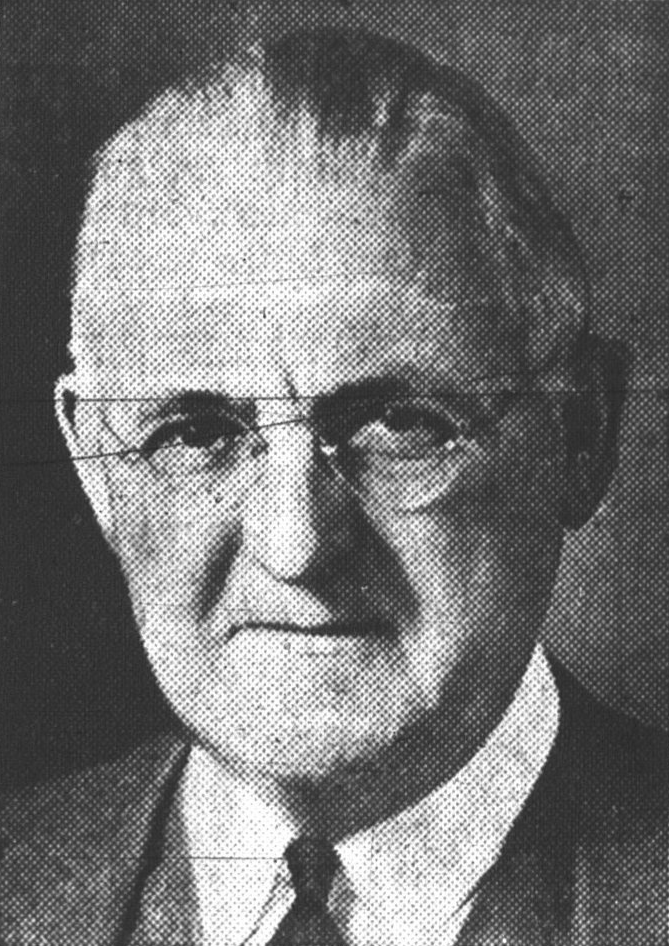
Frank Gannett

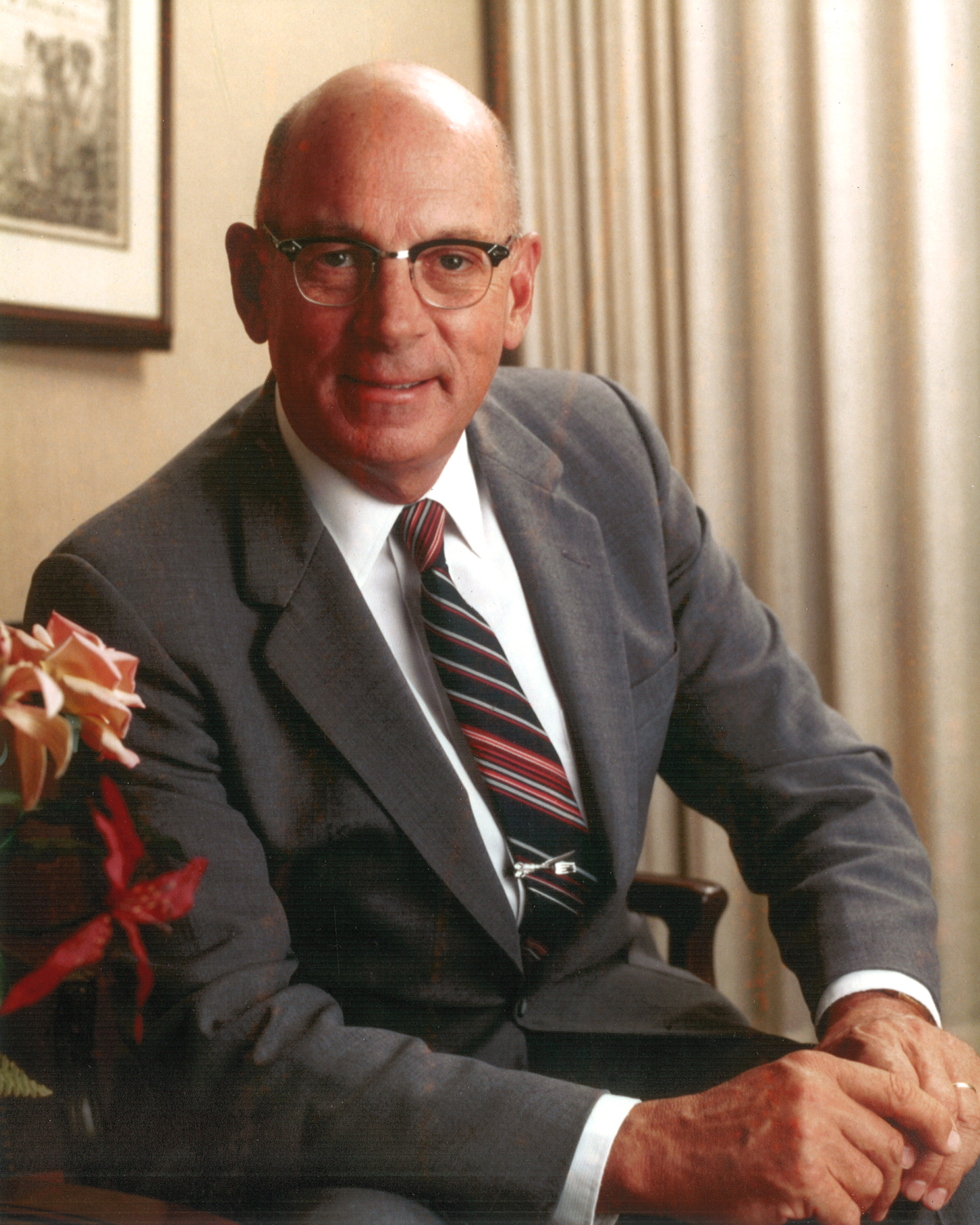
James McLamore

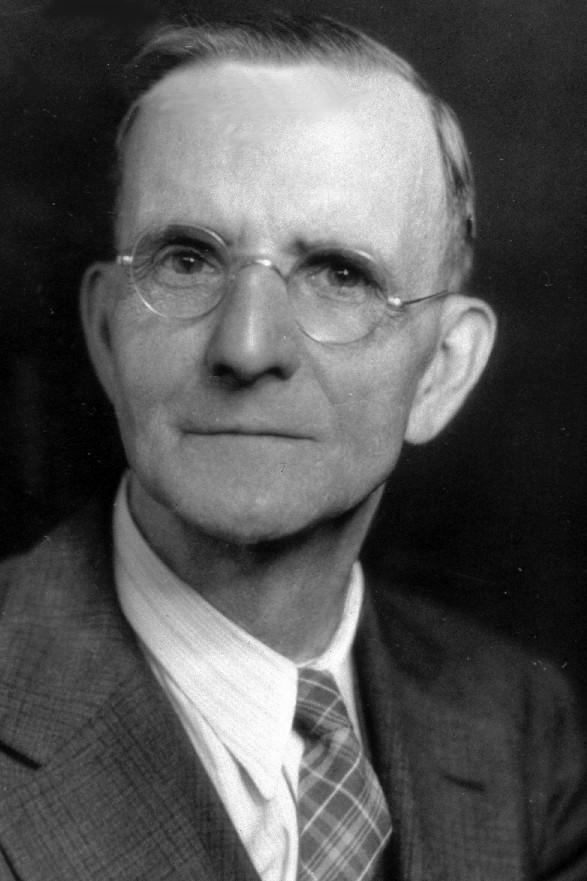
Clarence W. Spicer

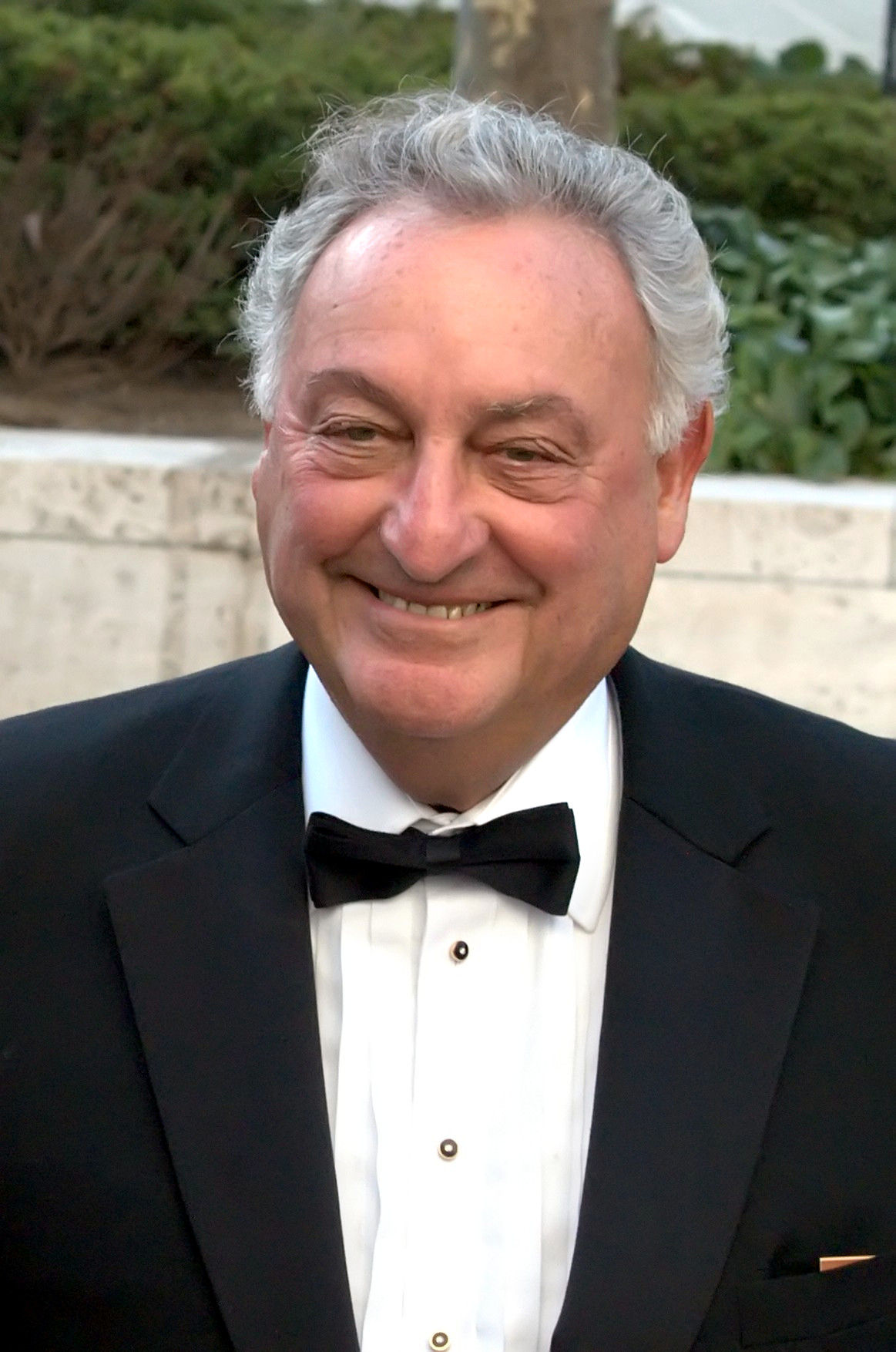
Sanford I. Weill

- James Altucher (B.S. 1989, Computer Science) – founder of Reset Inc., StockPickr
- Richard Baker (B.S. 1988, hotel administration) – founder, president, and CEO of NRDC Equity Partners and Hudson's Bay Company, the owner of Saks Fifth Avenue, Gilt Groupe, Lord & Taylor, The Bay, Home Outfitters, Zellers, and Fields
- André Balazs (class of 1979) – hotelier and businessman
- Aldo Bensadoun (attended, transferred) – billionaire founder and executive chairman of the ALDO Group
- Amit Bhatia (B.S. 2001) – founder of Swordfish Investments; vice chairman of Queen's Park Rangers
- Daniel Cane (B.S. 1997) – co-founder of Blackboard Inc.
- Willis Carrier (M.E. 1901) – founder of Carrier Corporation; inventor of air conditioning
- Gerald Cassidy (J.D. 1967) – co-founder and CEO of Cassidy & Associates
- Steve Conine (B.S. 1995) – billionaire co-founder of Wayfair
- Joseph Coors (B.Chem. 1939, chemical engineering 1940) – co-founder of The Heritage Foundation
- Mac Cummings (B.A. 2001) – co-founder of Terakeet Corporation; director of Internet Finance
- Tom Dinwoodie (B.S. 1978, civil and environmental engineering) – Cleantech entrepreneur, inventor, and founder of SunPower Corporation Systems (formerly PowerLight Corporation)
- Ira Drukier (B.S. 1966 engineering) – hotelier and philanthropist, donated US$25 million in December 2014 to establish the Drukier Institute for Children's Health at the Weill Cornell Medical College
- David Duffield (B.E.E. 1962, M.B.A. 1964) – billionaire co-founder of PeopleSoft and Workday
- John S. Dyson (B.S. 1965) – creator of the "I Love NY" campaign; owner of Millbrook Vineyards and Winery
- David Edgerton (B.A. 1947, hotel administration) – co-founder of Burger King Corporation
- David Einhorn (B.A. 1991) – founder and president of Greenlight Capital; billionaire hedge fund manager
- Chuck Feeney (B.S. 1956 hotel administration) – co-founder of Duty Free Shoppers Group; founder and director of Atlantic Philanthropies; founder of General Atlantic; billionaire philanthropist who has given away more than $8 billion
- Russell W. Galbut (B.S. 1974 hotel administration) – co-founder of Crescent Heights, a real estate development company
- Frank Gannett (B.A. 1898) – founder of Gannett, the largest U.S. newspaper publisher; namesake of Gannett Health Center
- Art Gensler (B.Arch. 1958) – founder and chairman of Gensler
- Stephen Gilfus (B.S. 1997) – co-founder of Blackboard Inc. sold to Providence Equity for $1.6 billion.
- Paul Graham (B.A.) – co-founder of Viaweb, sold for $46.6 million to Yahoo! and became Yahoo! Stores; Lisp programmer, author, founder of Y-Combinator
- Leroy Grumman (B.S. 1916 mechanical engineering) – founder of Grumman Aerospace Corporation; recipient of the Medal for Merit (1948)
- Myra Hart (B.A. 1962, M.B.A. 1981, trustee, 1999–) – one of four co-founders of Staples, Inc.; professor at Harvard Business School
- Jeff Hawkins (B.S. 1979 electrical engineering) – founder of Palm, Inc. and Handspring; inventor of the Palm Pilot; member of the National Academy of Engineering (2003)
- Christopher Hemmeter (B.S. 1962, hotel administration) – founder and chairman of Hemmeter Companies
- Irwin M. Jacobs (B.E.E. 1956) – billionaire, co-founder and chairman of Qualcomm; UCSD and MIT engineering professor, pioneer of CDMA wireless technology, philanthropist; recipient of numerous awards including National Medal of Technology and Innovation (1994), Marconi Prize (2011), IEEE Medal of Honor (2013); member of the National Academy of Engineering (1982)
- Stephen A. Jarislowsky (B.S. 1946 mechanical engineering) – billionaire businessman and philanthropist; founder, chairman, and CEO of Jarislowsky Fraser Limited
- Seth Klarman (B.A. 1979) – founder and chairman of the Baupost Group; hedge fund manager, billionaire
- Jules Kroll (B.A. 1963) – founder of Kroll Inc. and the modern investigations, intelligence, and security industry; responsible for tracking the assets of Jean-Claude Duvalier, Ferdinand and Imelda Marcos, and Saddam Hussein
- Robert S. Langer (B.S. 1970, chemical engineering) – founder of Moderna
- David Litman (1979, 1982) – founder and CEO of Hotels.com
- Yossi Maiman – founder and owner of the Merhav Group, a shareholder of the East Mediterranean Gas Company, and former chairman, chief executive officer and president of the Ampal-American Israel Corporation
- James McLamore (B.A. 1947, hotel administration) – co-founder of Burger King Corporation
- Gary Mendell (B.S. 1979 hotel administration) – founder, chairman, and CEO of HEI Hotels & Resorts
- Robert Warren Miller (B.S. 1955, hotel administration) – billionaire co-founder of Duty Free Shoppers Group
- Howard Milstein (B.A. 1973) – billionaire real estate developer, financier, and philanthropist; chairman, president, and chief executive officer of New York Private Bank & Trust
- Harriet Converse Moody (B.A. 1876) – businesswoman and arts patron
- Jeff Morgan (B.S. City and Regional Planning) – founder of Global Heritage Fund
- Rohan Murty (B.S. Computer Science) – founder of Murty Classical Library of India
- Floyd R. Newman (B.S. 1912 chemistry) – founder of Allied Oil Company of Cleveland
- Drew Nieporent (B.S. 1977 hotel administration) – founder of Myriad Restaurant Group
- Franklin W. Olin (B.C.E. 1886) – founder of Olin Corporation; gave a gift to build Olin Hall in memory of his son Franklin W. Olin Jr.
- John M. Olin (B.S. 1913 chemistry) – founder of John M. Olin Foundation, president, Olin Corporation; namesake of Olin Library
- Spencer Truman Olin (B.S. 1921 mechanical engineering) – industrialist and philanthropist; an executive of the Olin Corporation; Republican Party leader
- Peter Busch Orthwein (B.S. 1968, MBA 1969) – co-founder and chairman of Thor Industries
- Nathaniel A. Owings – founding partner of Skidmore, Owings and Merrill (SOM)
- Tom Peters (B.C.E. 1965, M.C.E. 1966) – business management motivational guru
- Harris Rosen (B.S. 1961 hotel administration) – founder of Rosen Hotels and Resorts; major donor of Rosen College of Hospitality Management (which was renamed due to his major donation)
- Rob Ryan (B.A. 1969) – founder and chairman of Ascend Communications
- William Sanders (B.S. 1964) – founder of LaSalle Partners (later merged to form Jones Lang LaSalle); founder and chairman of Security Capital Group Incorporated; former chairman of the National Association of Real Estate Investment Trusts (NAREIT)
- Niraj Shah (born 1973/74) (B.S. 1995) – billionaire CEO and co-founder of Wayfair
- Leonard Schleifer (B.S. 1970) – founder and CEO of Regeneron Pharmaceuticals; billionaire
- Seth M. Siegel (B.S. 1974, J. D. 1978) – founder of The Beanstalk Group
- Robert F. Smith (B.S. chemical engineering) – billionaire investor; founder, chairman, and CEO of Vista Equity Partners; ranked by Forbes in 2015 as 268th richest man in America, and the second wealthiest African-American
- Elmer Ambrose Sperry – founder of Sperry Corporation, known for his invention of Gyrostabilizer and the Gyrocompass; recipient of John Fritz Medal (1927) and Elliott Cresson Medal from the Franklin Institute (1929), member of the National Academy of Sciences (1925)
- Clarence W. Spicer (engineering student) – founder of what is now Dana Holding Corporation; engineer, inventor, known for invention of Universal joint; inductee into the Automotive Hall of Fame
- John A. Swanson (B.S. 1962, M.S. 1963) – founder of ANSYS and John Fritz Medal winner; member of the National Academy of Engineering (2009)
- Jake Swirbul (attended) – co-founder of Grumman Aerospace Corporation
- Michael Tien (B.S. 1972 electrical engineering) – founder and chairman of the apparel retail company G2000
- Robert V. Tishman (1937) – founder of Tishman Speyer Properties
- Robert I. Toll (B.A. 1963) – billionaire, co-founder of Toll Brothers
- Deena Varshavskaya – founder and CEO of Wanelo
- Tien Tzuo (B.S. 1990 electrical engineering) – founder and CEO of Zuora
- Jay Walker (B.S. 1977 industrial relations) – founder of Priceline.com; founder and chairman of Walker Digital, a billionaire on Forbes list of the world's billionaires ($1.6 billion in 2000)
- Colston Warne (bachelor's 1920, master's 1921 economics) – co-founder of the Consumers Union and its Consumer Reports monthly magazine and served as its president for 43 years; professor of economics at Amherst College (1930–1969)
- Sanford I. Weill (B.A. 1955 government) – billionaire, former chairman and CEO of Citigroup; founder of Shearson Loeb Rhoades, sold for $930 million to American Express; namesake of Weill Cornell Medical College
- David F. Welch (Ph.D. 1985 electrical engineering) – co-founder, president of Infinera Corp; member of the National Academy of Engineering (2016)
- Justin DuPratt White (1890) – co-founder of White & Case law firm; trustee of the Cornell University Board of Trustees (1928–1939)
- John Zimmer (B.S. 2006 hotel administration) – co-founder and COO of Zimride; co-founder and president of Lyft

=== Chairpersons, CEOs, and executives ===
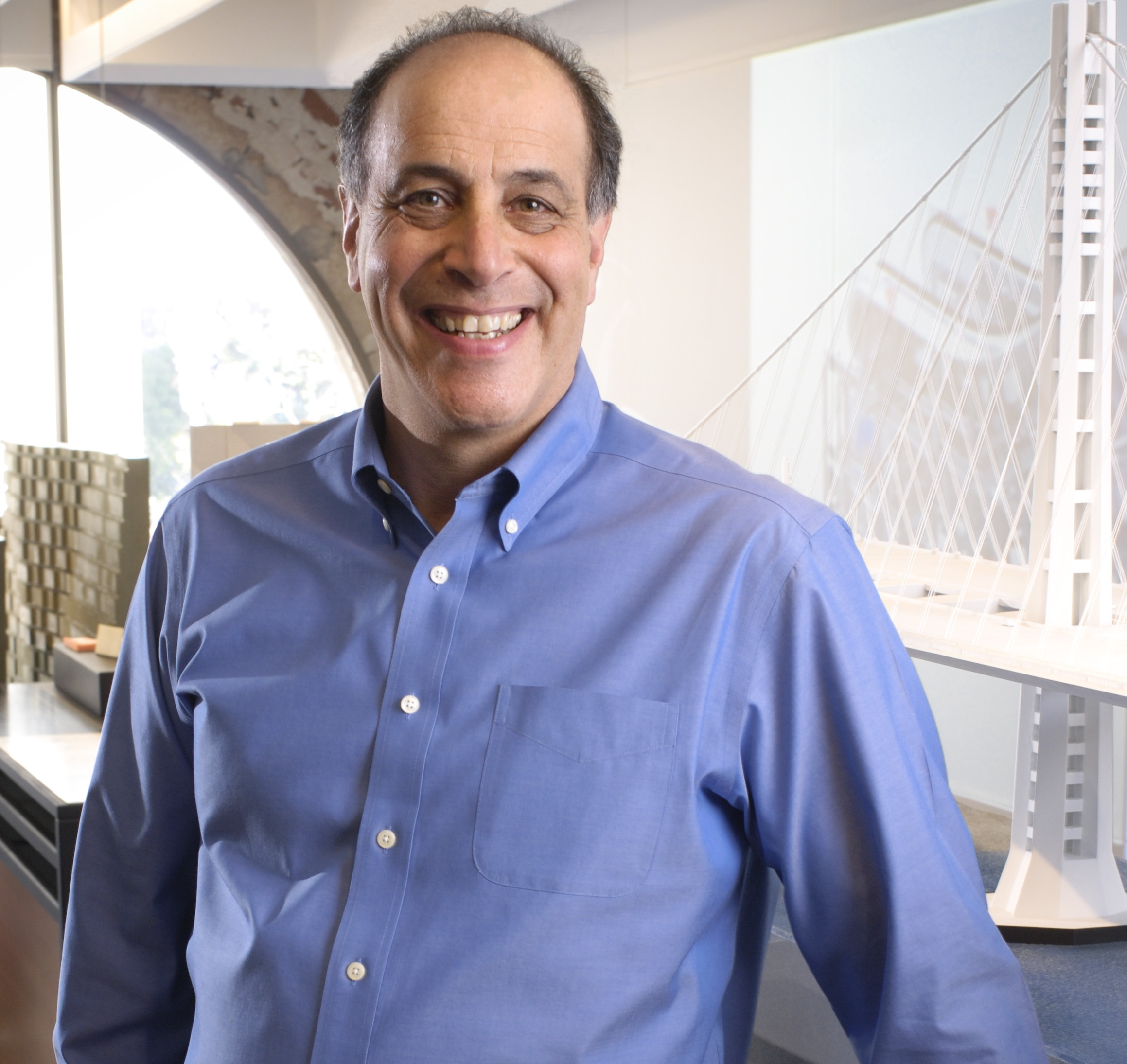
Carl Bass

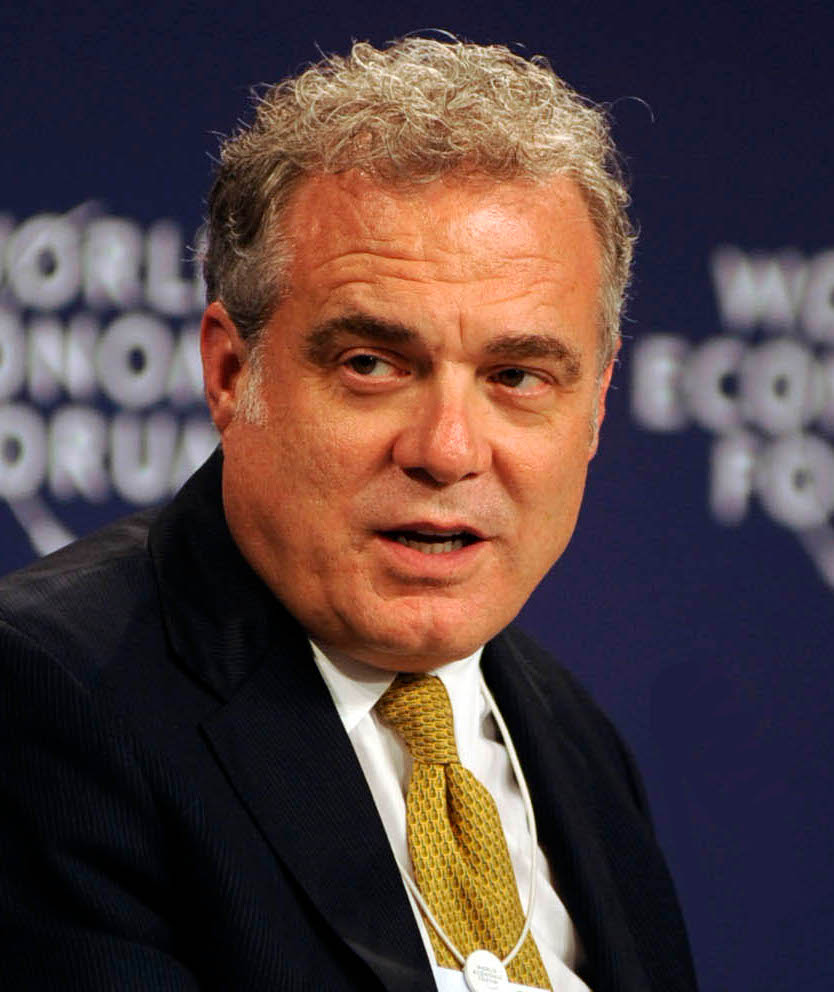
Mark Bertolini

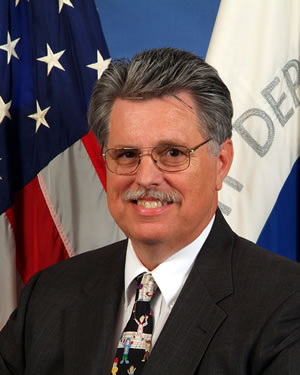
Joseph H. Boardman

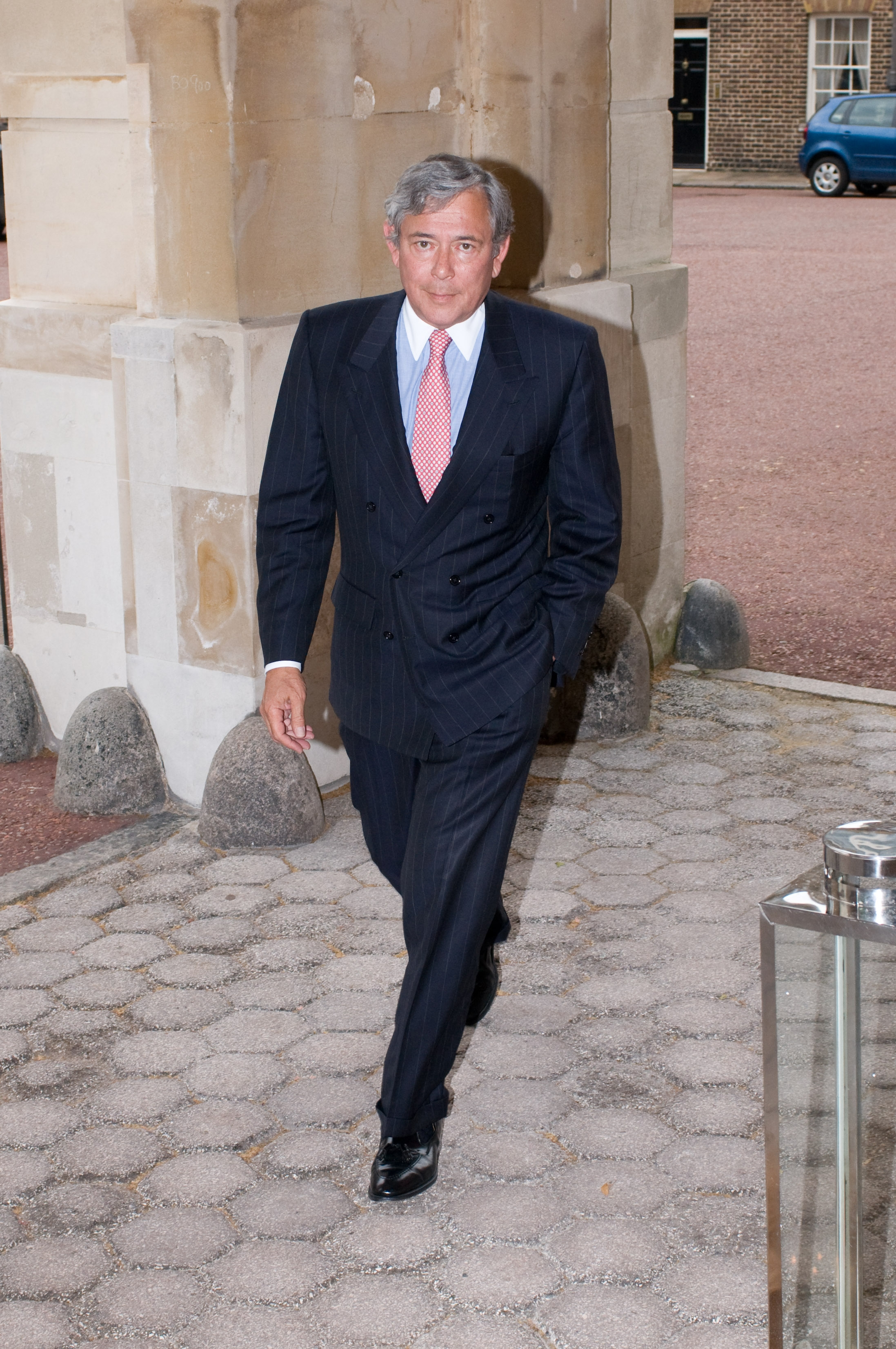
Eric Daniels

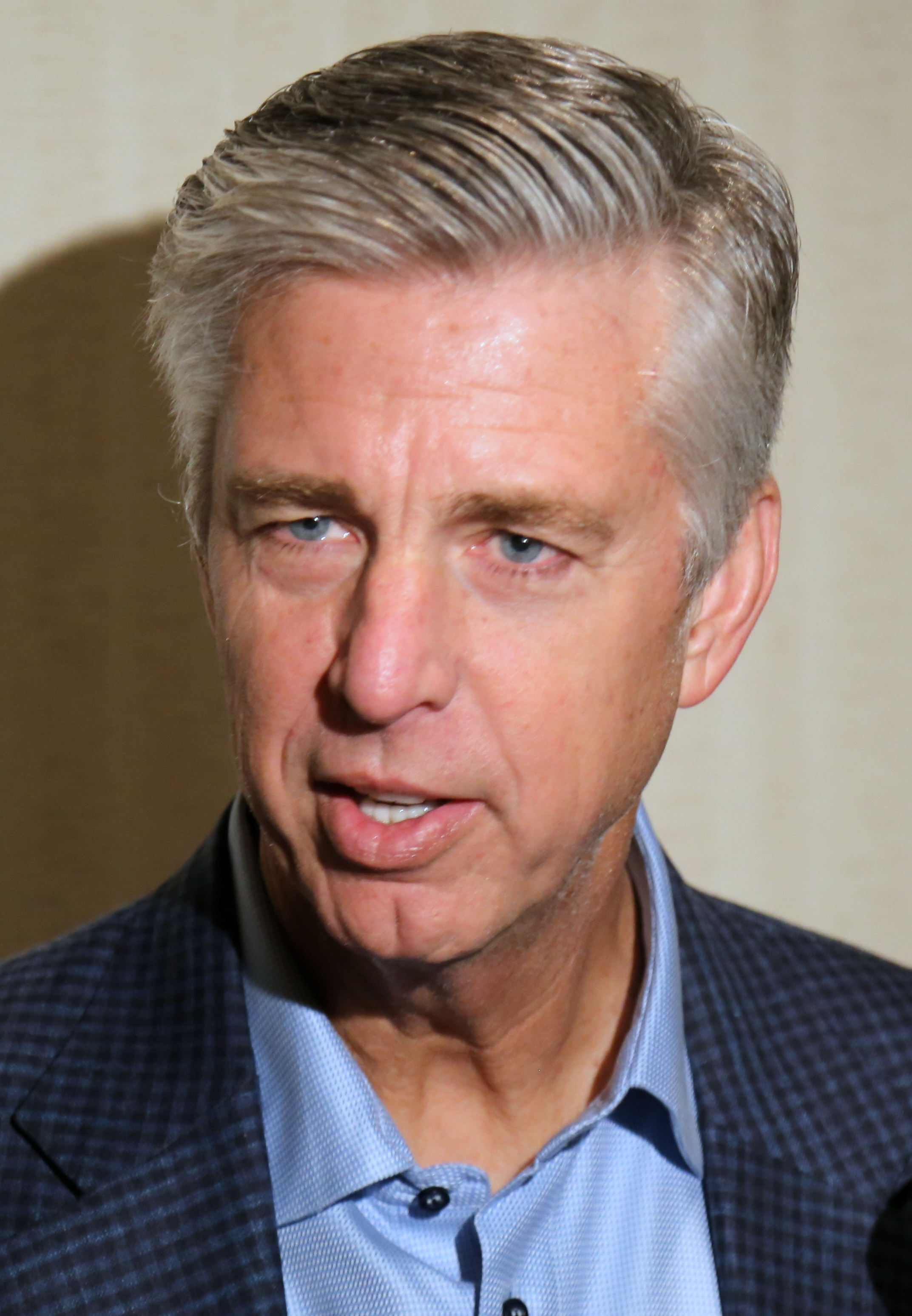
David Dombrowski

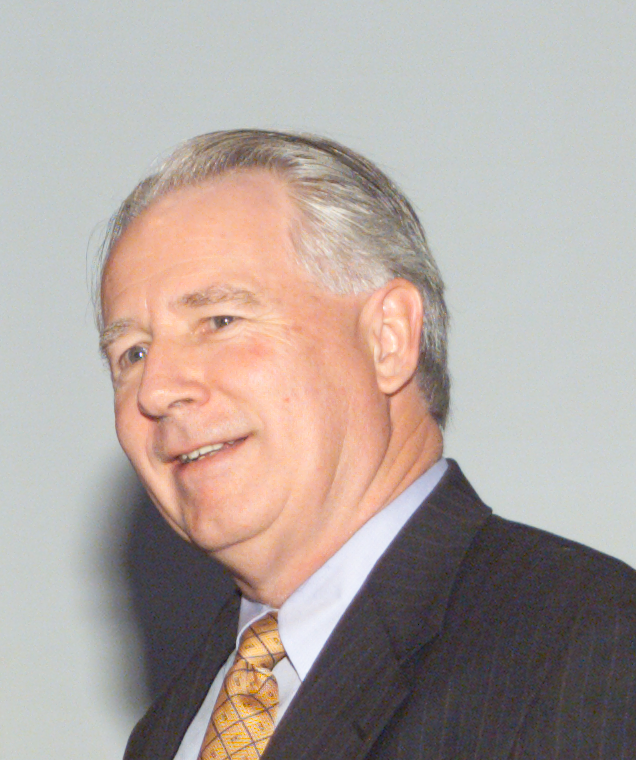
Robert D. Kennedy

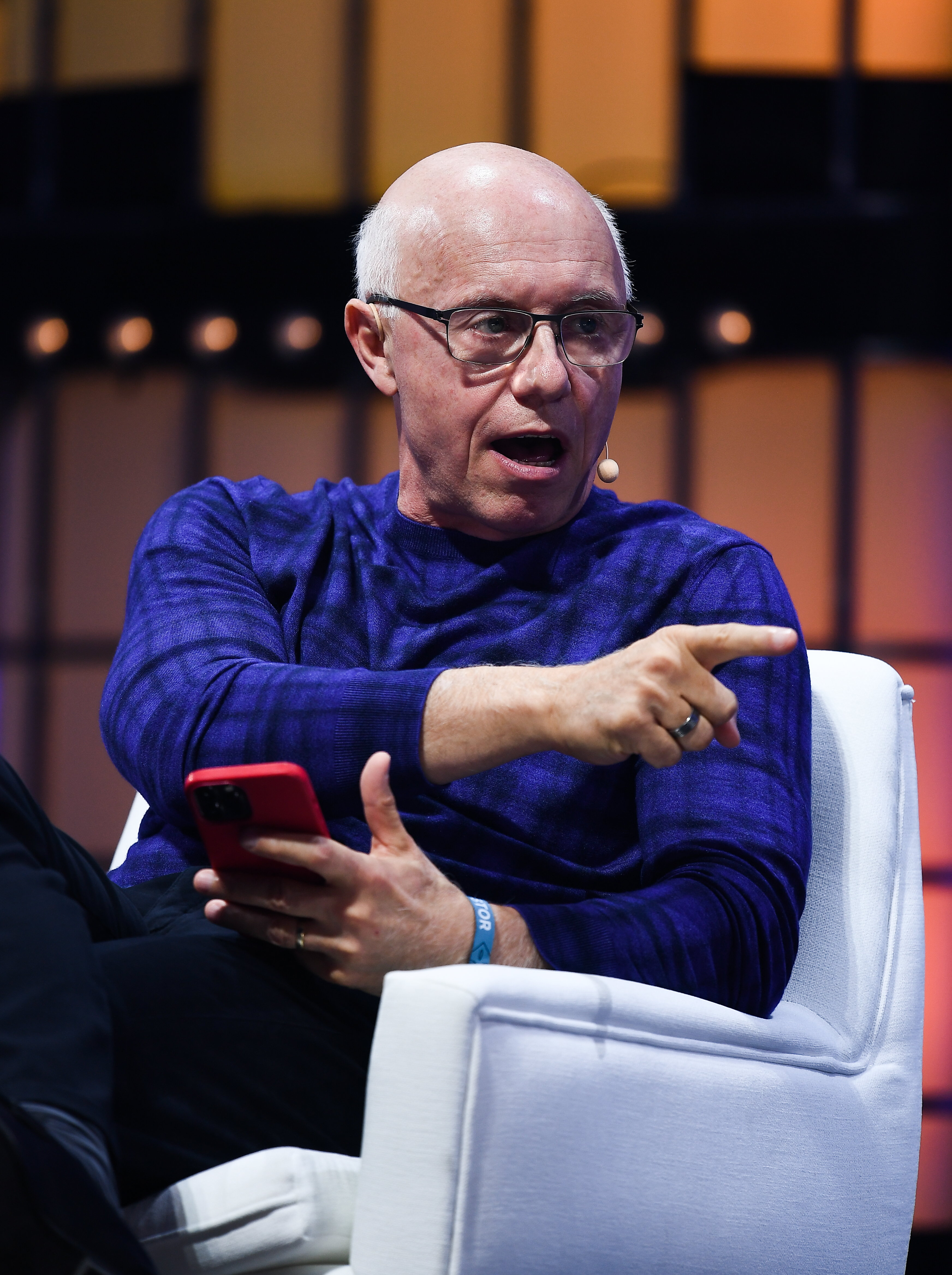
Douglas Leone

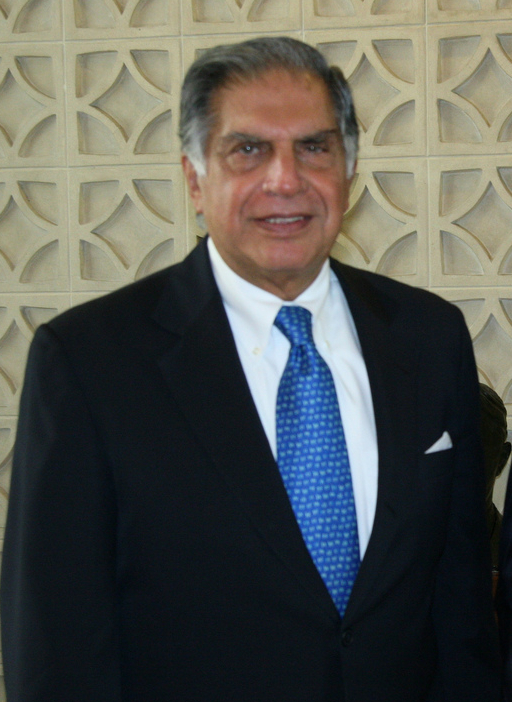
Ratan Tata

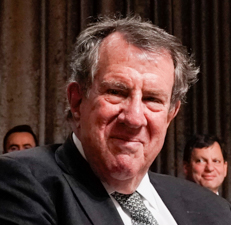
Andrew Tisch

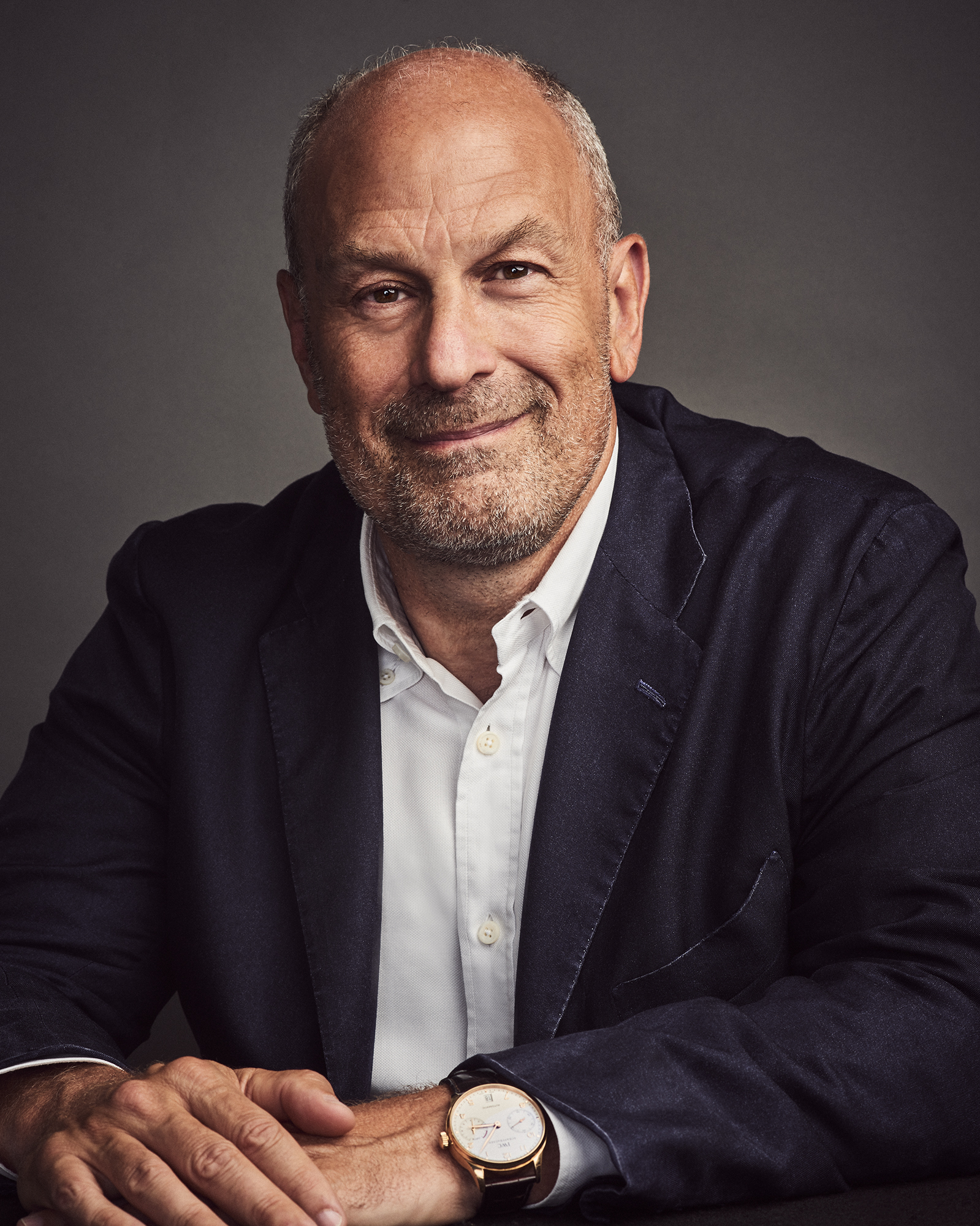
Barry Weiss

- Keith Barr (B.S. 1992 hotel administration) – CEO of InterContinental Hotels Group (IHG) (2017–)
- Carl Bass (B.A. 1983 mathematics) – former CEO and president of Autodesk (2006–2017)
- Al Bernardin (1952) – creator of the McDonald's Quarter Pounder; former vice president of Product Development for McDonald's
- Mark Bertolini (MBA 1984) – CEO and president of Aetna
- Jeffrey Bleustein (B.S. 1960, B.M.E 1961) – chairman and former CEO of Harley Davidson
- Joseph H. Boardman (B.S. agriculture economics) – president and CEO of Amtrak (2008–2016), 11th Federal Railroad administrator (2005–2008), New York State commissioner of Transportation (1997–2005)
- Val A. Browning (B.S. 1917) – president of Browning Arms Company and American soldier in World War I
- Walter S. Carpenter Jr. (undergrad 1906–09, dropped out) – president (1940–48) and chairman (1948–62) of DuPont
- Abby Joseph Cohen (B.A. 1973 economics and computer science, trustee) – partner and senior investment strategist of Goldman Sachs; president of Global Markets Institute (GMI), Goldman Sachs
- Jennie Chua (B.S. 1971, hotel administration) – CEO of Capitaland Residential, former CEO of Raffles Holdings
- Anne Chow (B.S. 1988, M.S. 1989, MBA 1990) – CEO of AT&T Business
- Adolph Coors II (B.A. 1907) – second president of Coors Brewing Company
- Pete Coors (B.S. 1969 industrial engineering) – executive of Coors Brewing Company; Senatorial candidate, 2004
- Luciano Coutinho (Ph.D. economics) – president of the Brazilian Development Bank (BNDES)
- Eric Daniels (B.A. 1973) – former CEO of Lloyds Banking Group
- Alonzo G. Decker Jr. (B.S. 1929 electrical engineering) – former president, CEO, and chairman of the board of Black & Decker; known for developing power tools for use in the home, including the first cordless electric drill
- Kenneth T. Derr (B.S. 1959 mechanical engineering, M.B.A. 1960, trustee) – chairman and CEO of Chevron, 1989–99
- Dave Dombrowski (undergrad 1974–75, transferred) – president, CEO, and general manager of the Detroit Tigers
- Jennifer Dulski (B.A., MBA) – president and chief operating officer of Change.org
- Henry D. Edelman (J.D. 1973) – president and CEO of Federal Agricultural Mortgage Corporation (Farmer Mac) (1989–2008)
- Richard J. Ferris (B.S. 1962) – president and CEO of United Airlines (1976–1987)
- Reggie Fils-Aimé (B.S. 1983 applied economics) – president and COO of Nintendo of America (2006–2019)
- J. Patrick Gallagher Jr (B.A. government) – president, CEO and chairman of Arthur J. Gallagher & Co.
- Pawan Kumar Goenka – managing director of Mahindra & Mahindra Ltd, an Indian multinational automobile manufacturing corporation headquartered in Mumbai, Maharashtra, India; chairman of SsangYong Motor Company in Korea
- Harvey Golub (attended 1956–1958) – president (1991–1993), chairman and CEO (1993–2001) of American Express; chairman of the board at the Campbell's (2004–2009); chairman of the American International Group (AIG) (2009–2010); chairman of the board of Advisors of Miller Buckfire (2011–)
- Byron Grote (Ph.D. 1981 quantitative analysis) – chief financial officer of BP
- Raj Gupta (M.S. 1969 operations research) – chairman, CEO and president of Rohm and Haas, chairman of Delphi Automotive (2015–)
- Robert Harrison (B.A. 1976 government) – CEO of the Clinton Global Initiative and chairman of the Cornell University Board of Trustees; Rhodes Scholar
- Dan Hesse (MBA 1977) – CEO of Sprint Nextel
- Matthew Hiltzik (B.S. 1994, ILR) – president and CEO of Hiltzik Strategies, a strategic consulting and communications firm
- D. Brainerd Holmes (B.S. 1943 electrical engineering) – best known for directing NASA's crewed spaceflight program from September 1961 to June 1963; president of Raytheon (1976–1986) and chairman of Beechcraft; member of the National Academy of Engineering (1977)
- F. Kenneth Iverson (1946, aeronautical engineering) – president of Nucor Steel (1967–1998); inductee into the American Metal Market Steel Hall and the American National Business Hall of Fame; recipient of the National Medal of Technology and Innovation (1991) and member of the National Academy of Engineering (1994)
- Walter C. Johnsen (B.S 1973, Master of Engineering (chemical) 1974) – chairman and CEO of Acme United Corporation
- Robert D. Kennedy (B.S. 1954 mechanical engineering) – chairman, president, and CEO of Union Carbide (1986–1995)
- Shaygan Kheradpir (bachelor's, master's, and doctorate 1979–1987 electrical engineering) – CEO of Juniper Networks
- Jeff Jacobson (M.S. ILR) – CEO of Xerox Corporation (2017–)
- Ken Jautz (B.A.) – executive vice president of CNN; former foreign correspondent for the Associated Press; former CNN bureau chief in Germany
- Herbert Fisk Johnson Jr. (B.A. 1922 chemistry) – president of S. C. Johnson & Son; benefactor and namesake of the Herbert F. Johnson Museum of Art on campus
- Herbert Fisk Johnson III (5 Cornell degrees 1979–86) – billionaire, CEO of S. C. Johnson & Son; benefactor and trustee emeritus of Cornell
- Samuel Curtis Johnson Jr. (B.A. 1950 economics) – billionaire, chairman of S. C. Johnson & Son; benefactor and co-namesake of the S.C. Johnson Graduate School of Management
- S. Curtis Johnson (B.S. 1977) – billionaire, former chairman of Diversey
- Helen Johnson-Leipold (B.A. 1978 psychology) – billionaire businesswoman; chairman of Johnson Financial Group, chairman and CEO of Johnson Outdoors
- Winnie Johnson-Marquart (B.S. 1981) – billionaire, president of the Johnson Family Foundation
- Thomas W. Jones (B.A. 1969, M.R.P. 1972, trustee) – principal of TWJ Capital LLC
- Paul L. Joskow (B.A. 1968) – president of the Alfred P. Sloan Foundation since 2008, economist
- Charles F. Knight (1957, MBA 1959) – chairman (1974–2004), CEO (1973–2000) and president (1986–1988, 1995–1997) of Emerson Electric Company
- Douglas Leone (B.S. 1979 mechanical engineering) – venture capitalist and partner at Sequoia Capital; billionaire
- Oscar G. Mayer Jr. (1934) – chairman of Oscar Mayer
- Timothy Mayopoulos (B.A. 1980) – president and CEO of Fannie Mae (2012–2018)
- Lowell McAdam (M.E. 1976) – chairman and CEO of Verizon
- Mary Meeker (MBA 1986 finance) – venture capitalist and former Wall Street securities analyst
- Peter C. Meinig (B.M.E 1962) – chairman and CEO of HM International, LLC
- Charles N. Mills (B.S. 1983, MBA 1984) – CEO of Medline Industries (1997–)
- Jon R. Moeller (B.S. 1986, MBA 1988) – CEO of Procter & Gamble
- Brian A. Murdock (B.S. 1978 economics) – president and CEO of Strategic Investment Group (2014–) and former chairman and CEO of TD Asset Management (2009–2013)
- Thomas Murphy (B.S. 1945) – former chairman and CEO of Capital Cities/ABC, Inc.; Television Hall of Fame, NATPE Lifetime Achievement Award (1996)
- Dayssi Olarte de Kanavos (B.A. 1985) – president and COO of Flag Luxury Group
- Lubna Olayan (B.S. 1977) – CEO of Olayan Financing Company, the holding entity for The Olayan Group's operations in the Kingdom of Saudi Arabia and the Middle East
- Salil Parekh (M.E.) – CEO and managing director of Infosys (2018–)
- James Wentworth Parker (class of 1908) – president and general manager of Detroit Edison Company (1943–1951) and of the American Society of Mechanical Engineers (1942–1943)
- William D. Perez (B.A. 1969 government) – CEO of Wm. Wrigley Jr. Company, CEO of Nike, Inc., 2004–06
- Victor Peng (MEng, electrical engineering) – president and CEO of Xilinx (2018–)
- Sandi Peterson (B.A.) – group worldwide chairman for Johnson & Johnson
- Joseph N. Pew Jr. (M.E. 1908) – vice president (1912–1947) and chairman (1947–1963) of Sun Oil Company; founder of The Pew Charitable Trusts; namesake of Pew Engineering Quad
- James Pitaro (B.S. 1991) – president of ESPN
- Georges Plassat – chairman and chief executive officer of Carrefour (2012–2017)
- Lewis Platt (B.S. 1964 mechanical engineering) – CEO of Hewlett-Packard (1992–99); chairman of Boeing, 2003–05
- Michael B. Polk (B.S. IEOR) – CEO of Newell Brands (2011–)
- Robert Purcell – chairman of Cornell University Board of Trustees (1968–1978)
- Justin Rattner (B.S. 1970 electrical engineering, M.S. 1972 computer science) – chief technology officer of Intel, ABC News Person of the Week for his work on the ASCI Red system (fastest computer in the world, 1996–2000), R&D Magazine's "Scientist of the Year", 1989
- Bruce S. Raynor (B.S. 1972 industrial & labor relations) – president of UNITE HERE
- George Rea (1915) – first paid president of the New York Curb Exchange
- Kevin Reilly (B.A. 1984) – president of NBC Entertainment (2004–2007), president (2007–2012) and chairman (2012–2014) of entertainment at Fox, president of TBS and TNT (2014–)
- Irene Rosenfeld (B.S. 1975, M.S. 1977, Ph.D. 1980) – CEO and chairwoman of Kraft Foods
- Frank Rosenfelt (LL.B. 1950) – former CEO of Metro-Goldwyn-Mayer (MGM) Studio
- Jon Rubinstein (B.S. 1978, MEng 1979) – CEO of Palm, Inc., Apple SVP 1997–2006; member of the National Academy of Engineering (2005)
- Demir Sabancı (MBA 1999) – Turkish entrepreneur, venture capitalist, and philanthropist
- Vicki Saporta (class of 1974) – president and CEO of the National Abortion Federation (1995–)
- Robert Selander (B.S. 1972) – president and CEO of MasterCard (1997–2010)
- Daniel Schwartz (B.S. 2001 applied economics and management) – CEO of Restaurant Brands International (Burger King Corporation)
- Steven Sinofsky (B.A. 1987) – president of Windows and Windows Live Engineering at Microsoft
- Charles E. Sporck (B.M.E. 1950) – microelectronics pioneer; co-founded the Semiconductor Industry Association; CEO and president of National Semiconductor (1967–1991)
- Kyung-Bae Suh (M.B.A. 1987) – chairman, CEO, and owner of Amorepacific Corporation
- Larry Tanenbaum (B.S. 1968) – chairman, Maple Leaf Sports & Entertainment
- Ratan Tata (B.Arch. 1962) – chairman, Tata Group
- Myron Charles Taylor (LL.B. 1894) – chairman and CEO, U.S. Steel, namesake of Taylor Hall, and Medal for Merit recipient
- Walter C. Teagle (B.S. 1899, trustee, 1924–54) – president and chairman of Standard Oil of New Jersey (now ExxonMobil) and namesake of Teagle Hall
- Andrew Tisch (B.S. 1971, hotel administration) – chairman, Loews Corporation
- James Tisch (B.A. 1975) – CEO, Loews Corporation
- Arnold Tremere – executive director, government official (Canadian International Grains Institute)
- Rick Tsai (Ph.D. 1981) – CEO of Taiwan Semiconductor Manufacturing Company
- Harold Uris (B.S. 1925, trustee 1967–1972) – real estate investor and builder; namesake of Uris Hall
- Sophie Vandebroek (Ph.D.) – chief technology officer of Xerox and president of Xerox Innovation Group (2006–)
- Charles W. Wason (1876) – president of the Cleveland, Painesville & Eastern Railway Company
- Randi Weingarten (B.S. 1980 ILR) – president of the United Federation of Teachers (1998−2008) and of the American Federation of Teachers (2008−)
- Barry Weiss – chairman and CEO of Island Def Jam and Universal Motown Republic
- Stephen H. Weiss (class of 1957) – investment banker and philanthropist
- Tim Wentworth (B.S. ILR) – CEO and president of Express Scripts (2016–)
- Mark Whitacre (Ph.D. nutritional biochemistry) – COO of Cypress Systems
- Fuganto Widjaja (B.A. 2003) – Indonesian billionaire businessman
- Lynton Wilson (M.A. economics) – president and CEO of Redpath Industries Ltd. (1981–1988); vice-chairman of the Bank of Nova Scotia; at various times president, COO, CEO, and chairman of the board of BCE Inc. (1990–2000); president and CEO of BCE Inc. (1992–1993); chairman of Nortel Networks (2000–2005); chairman of CAE Inc.; chancellor of McMaster University (2007–2013); Officer of the Order of Canada; recipient of honorary degrees from six Canadian universities
- Dennis Woodside (B.S. 1991) – CEO of Motorola Mobility; president of Google America
- Chung Yong-ji (Ph.D.) – founder and CEO of Caregen
- Robert D. Ziff (J.D. 1992) – billionaire co-CEO of Ziff Brothers Investments
- Stephen Zinser – hedge fund manager who co-founded European Credit Management, a financial firm based in London, and served as its CEO

== Entertainment ==
=== Film, radio, television and theatre ===
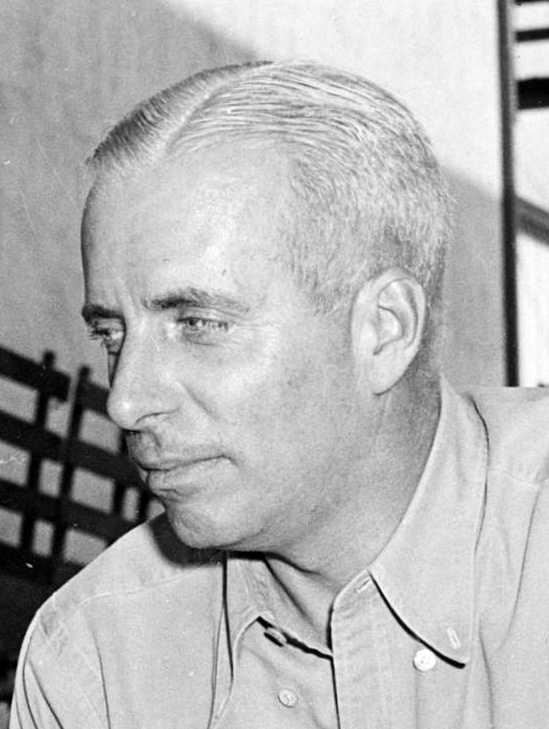
Howard Hawks

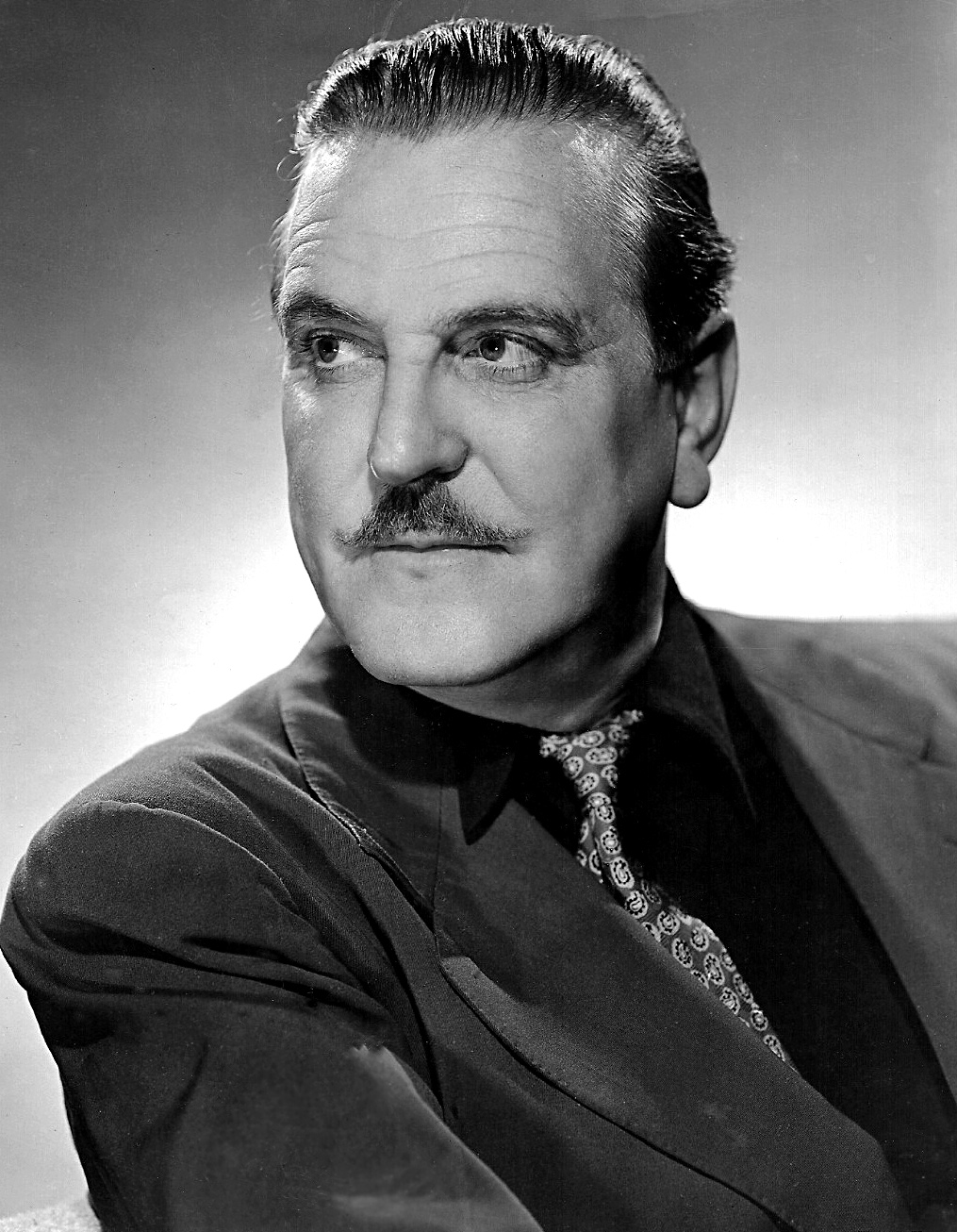
Frank Morgan

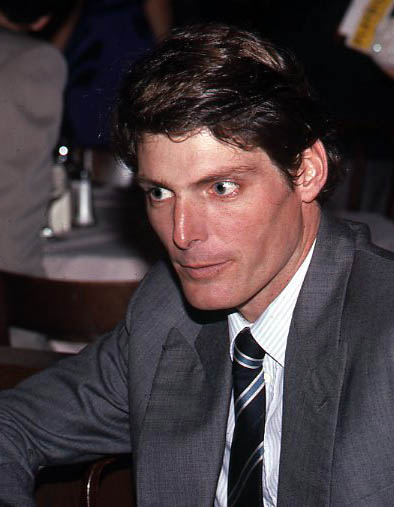
Christopher Reeve

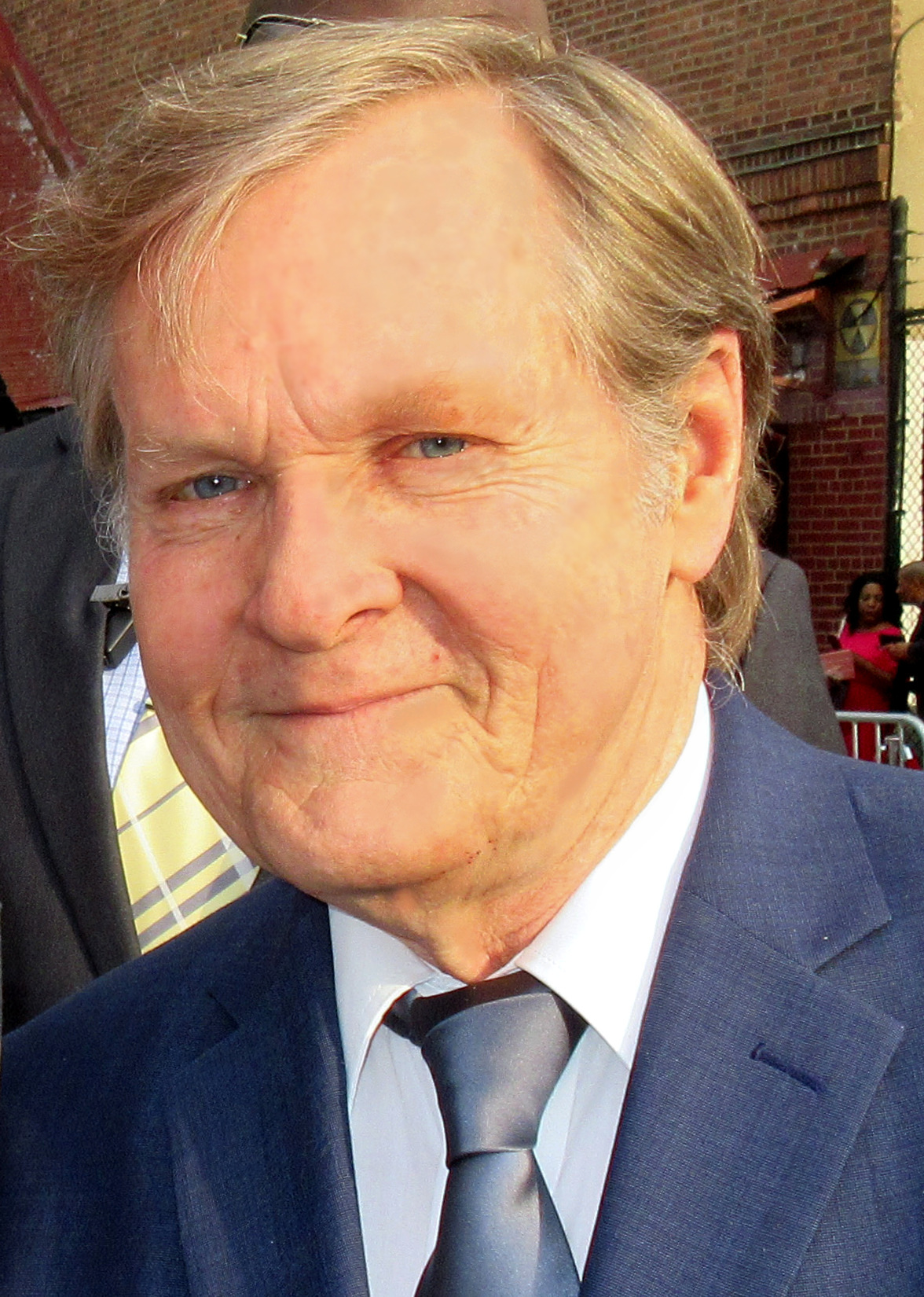
William Sadler

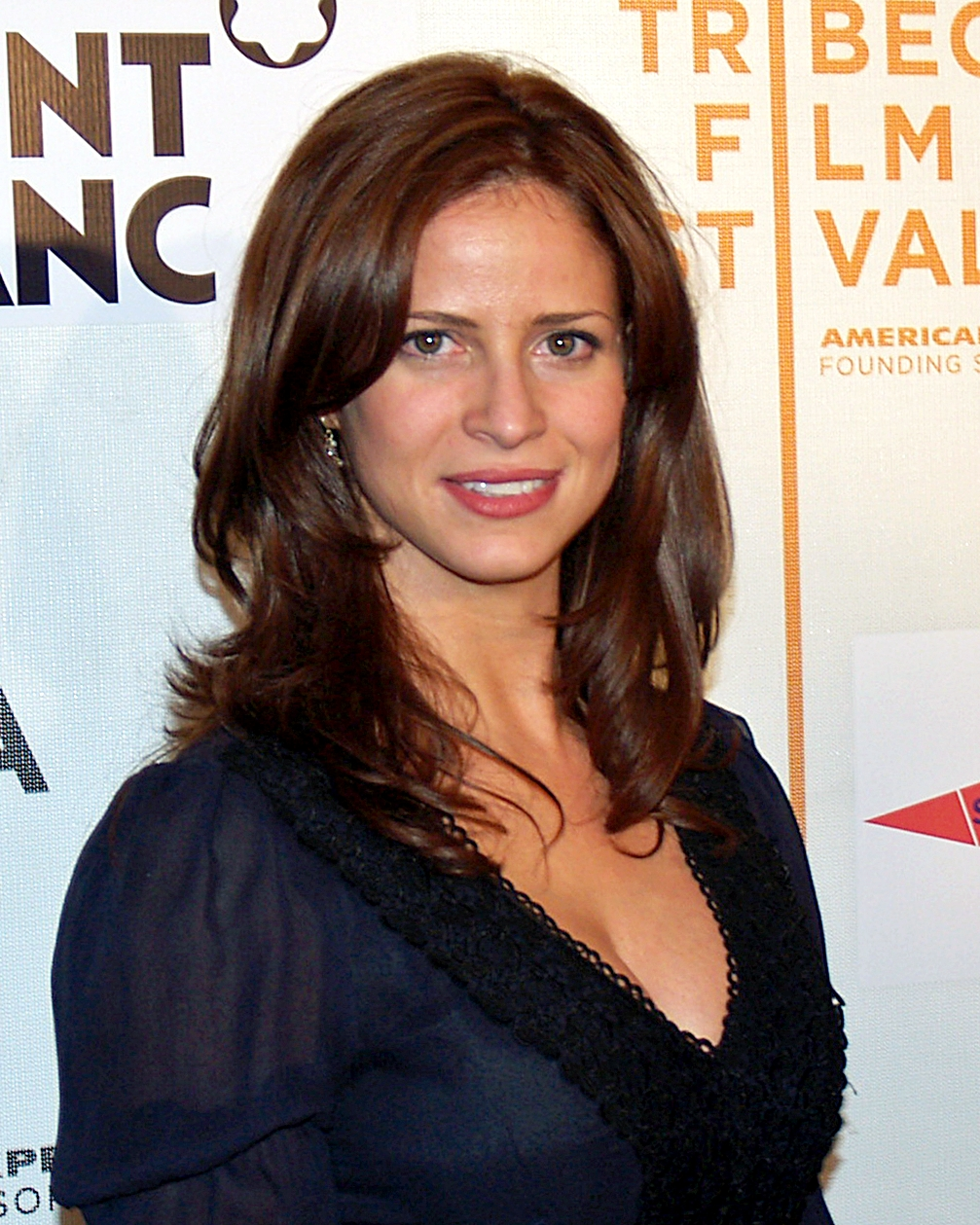
Andrea Savage

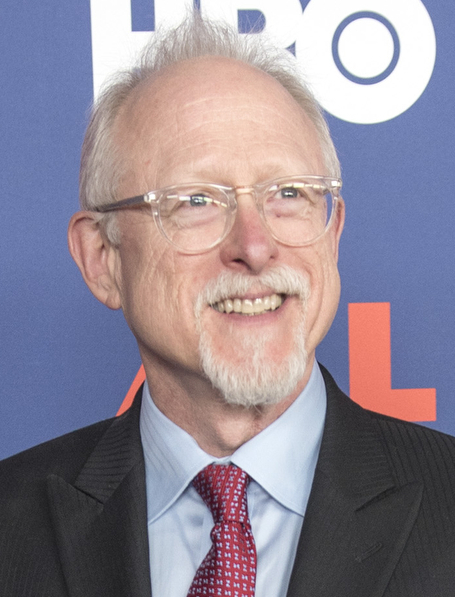
Robert Schenkkan

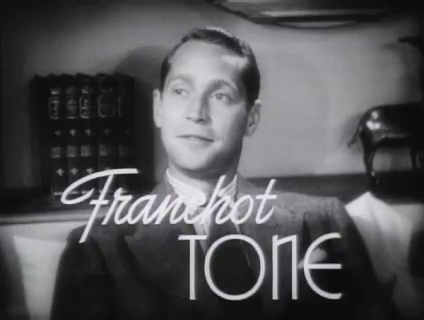
Franchot Tone

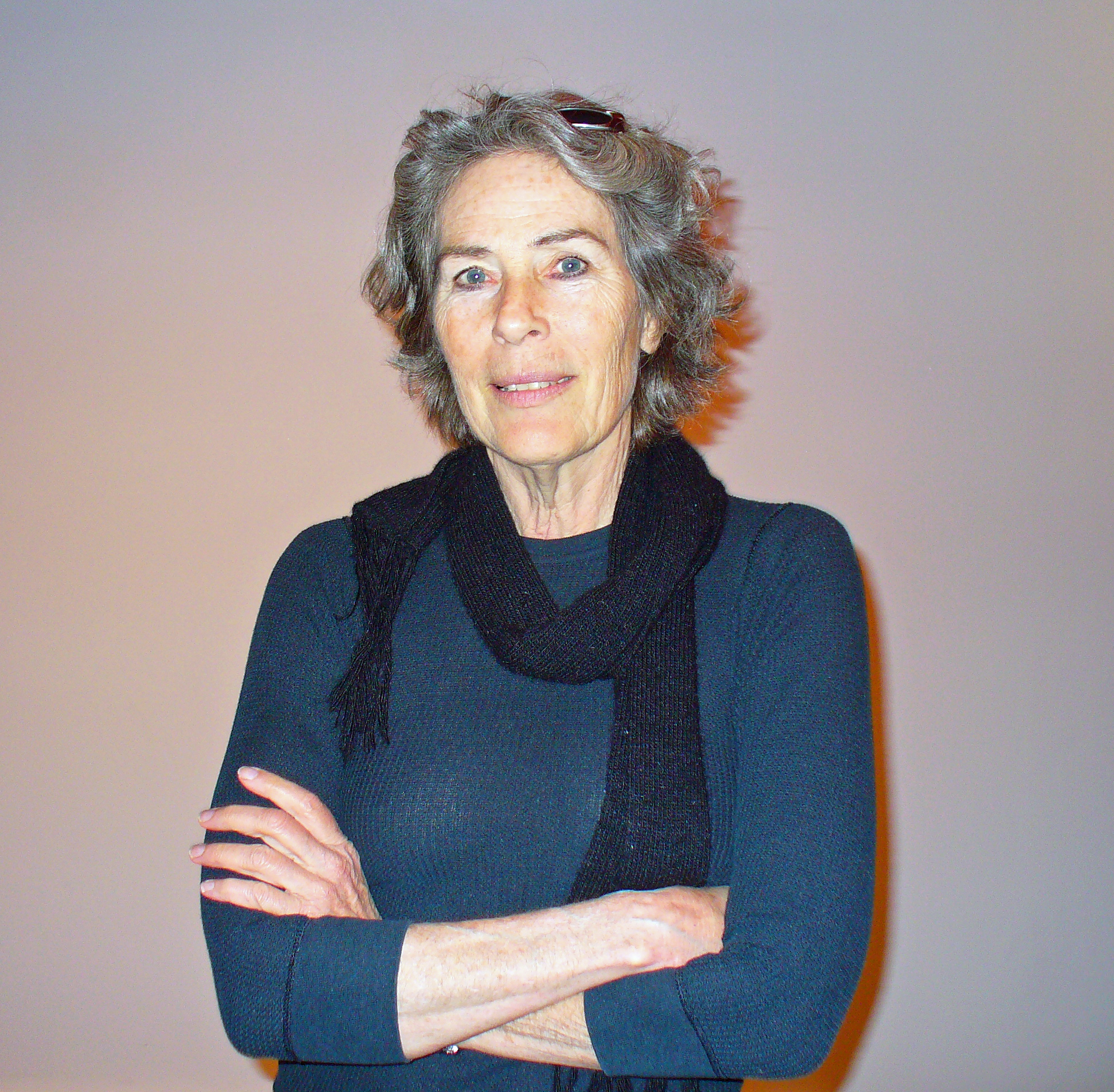
Mary Woronov

- Robert Ahrens (B.A.) – film and theatre producer
- Ted Berkman (1933) – screenwriter, Bedtime for Bonzo
- Andrea Berloff (B.A.) – Oscar-nominated screenwriter, Straight Outta Compton
- Josh Bernstein (B.A. 1993 anthropology and psychology) – host, Digging for the Truth on the History Channel
- Prashant Bhargava (B.A. 1994) – filmmaker and director
- Steve Carver (B.A.) – film director and producer
- Dane Clark (B.A.1930s) – actor, Moonrise
- Jordan Clarke (B.A. 1973 philosophy, M.F.A. 1973 acting) – actor, Guiding Light, winner of Daytime Emmy for Best Supporting Actor in a Drama Series
- Steve Cohen (B.A. 1993) – magician, illusionist, writer, and television host
- Gia Crovatin (B.A.) – actress
- Gordon Davidson (1956) – Drama Desk Award for Outstanding Director and Tony Award for Best Direction of a Play-winning stage and film director; fellow of the American Academy of Arts and Sciences
- Maria Dizzia (theater) – actress, nominated for the 2010 Tony Award for Best Performance by a Featured Actress in a Play for her performance in In the Next Room (or The Vibrator Play)
- Ellen Albertini Dow (B.A. 1935 theater, M.A. 1938 theater) – actress, Wedding Crashers and The Wedding Singer
- Dan Duryea (B.A. English) – actor
- Rick Elice (B.A.) – writer and former stage actor
- Negin Farsad (B.A. 1998) – stand-up comedian, writer, panelist on Wait Wait... Don't Tell Me!
- Scott Ferguson (B.A. Theatre) – executive producer, Succession
- Zelda Fichandler – doyenne of regional theater
- Art Fleming – original Jeopardy! host, 1964–1975
- Steven Franken (B.A. 1950) – actor, best known for his role in The Many Loves of Dobie Gillis
- Robert N. Fried (B.S., M.S.) – film producer, screenwriter, studio executive and media entrepreneur; Academy Award recipient in 1992 for his short film, Session Man
- David F. Friedman (1942, electrical engineering) – filmmaker
- Allen Funt (B.A. 1934 fine arts) – producer, created Candid Camera
- Carla Gallo (B.A. theater) – actress notable for recurring roles in the television series Undeclared, Carnivàle, Bones, Californication
- Eric Garcia (transferred 1992) – writer, author of Matchstick Men
- Joel Gertner (1993–1996, dropped out) – former ECW personality
- Will Gluck (B.A. Arts) - writer, director, producer: movies/TV
- Sam Gold (B.A. English 2000) – theater director and actor; 2015 Tony Award for Best Direction of a Musical winner for Fun Home
- Meta Golding (theatre arts and international relations) – Haitian-American actress
- Harold Gould (M.A. 1948 theater, Ph.D. 1953 dramatic speech and literature) – stage, screen, and television actor
- Paul Green – playwright, known for Pulitzer Prize for Drama for his play, In Abraham's Bosom (1927)
- Kovid Gupta (M.B.A. 2015) – screenwriter, author, Kingdom of The Soap Queen: The Story of Balaji Telefilms
- Joanna Guy (B.A. 2013) – Miss Maryland 2012
- Brian Hallisay (degree in economics and history) – actor from the television show Privileged
- Howard Hawks (mechanical engineering) – film director, producer, and writer of the classic Hollywood era; directed Scarface, His Girl Friday, The Big Sleep, and Gentleman Prefer Blondes
- Babette Henry (1936, hotel administration) – television director and producer; directed and produced Buck Rogers, directed Paul Whiteman's Goodyear Revue and That Wonderful Guy
- Hugh Herbert – actor, playwright and comedian
- Catherine Hicks (M.F.A. 1976?) – actress; played Annie Camden on 7th Heaven
- John Hostetter (M.A. acting) – actor, played John the stage manager on Murphy Brown for 62 episodes
- Ricky Jay (Hotel) – magician, historian, actor, writer and scholar
- Frederick Johnson (B.A. 1978 English) – Emmy and WGA Award-winning television writer; credits include All My Children, The Young and the Restless, Days of Our Lives, As The World Turns, One Life to Live, Guiding Light
- Sidney Kingsley (B.A. 1928) – playwright, screenwriter, winner of the Pulitzer Prize in 1934 for the drama Men in White
- Alan Klingenstein (J.D./MBA 1982) - film producer, distributor, and entertainment executive. Credits include Two Family House, winner of the Audience Award at the Sundance Film Festival
- Mia Korf – actress, best known for originating the role of Blair Daimler Buchanan on One Life to Live
- Jamie Kovac (B.S. 2001, MEng 2002) – "Fury" on American Gladiators
- Ellie Krieger (B.S. 1988) – nutritionist, chef, and TV food celebrity
- Arthur Laurents (B.A. 1937 English) – playwright, screenwriter, director, author, credits include West Side Story, Rope, and Gypsy
- Leonard "Lenny" Lipton – author, filmmaker, and stereoscopic vision system inventor; founder of StereoGraphics
- Jane Lynch (M.F.A. 1984 theater) – actress, best known for Glee
- Bill Maher (B.A. 1978 English) – comedian and satirist, best known for hosting the television series Politically Incorrect and Real Time with Bill Maher
- Rob Marciano – journalist and meteorologist
- Ed Marinaro – film and television actor.
- Louis Massiah (B.A. Astrophysics) – documentary filmmaker; MacArthur Fellow (1996), Tribeca Film Institute Fellow (1990, 1996), Fleisher Founder's Award (2009)
- Peter Marx – television host; information law attorney; technology business consultant; producer
- Gardner McKay (attended for 2 years) – actor, artist, and author known for the lead role in the 1960s TV series Adventures in Paradise
- Carol Mendelsohn (B.A. 1973) – television producer; credits include C.S.I.
- Adolphe Menjou (B.S. engineering) – actor, known for his roles in The Sheik, The Three Musketeers, and Paths of Glory
- Justin H. Min (B.A. 2011 Government and English) – actor; currently stars as Ben Hargreeves in The Umbrella Academy
- Ronald D. Moore (failed out 1985) – writer and producer of Star Trek: The Next Generation, Star Trek: Deep Space Nine, and the re-imagined Battlestar Galactica; two–time Hugo Award winner, nominated for an Emmy Award
- Frank Morgan (undergrad 1908–09, dropped out) – actor who played the Wizard in The Wizard of Oz, two-time Academy Award nominee
- Bill Nye (B.S. 1977 mechanical engineering, MEng 1977, Frank H.T. Rhodes Class of '56 University Professor 2001–06) – star of Bill Nye the Science Guy; science education advocate
- Adepero Oduye (1999) – actress in 12 Years a Slave and Pariah
- Peter Ostrum (D.V.M. 1984) – played Charlie Bucket in Willy Wonka & the Chocolate Factory
- Evan Parke (1990) – actor best known for his role as Hayes in King Kong
- Ethan Phillips (MFA) – actor and playwright
- Bill Pidto (1987) – host of NHL Live on NHL Network and former anchor at ESPN, 1993–2008
- Richard Price (B.S. 1971) – author, The Wanderers and six other novels; Academy Award-nominated screenwriter for The Color of Money and Clockers
- Keith Raywood (B.A. Architecture, 1980) – Emmy Award-winning production designer
- Christopher Reeve (B.A. 1974 theater arts and English) – actor, best known for starring in Superman and its sequels
- Jason Reich (B.S. Communication 1998) – Emmy Award-winning writer for The Daily Show with Jon Stewart
- Christopher Rich (M.A. Theater Arts) – played Miller Redfield on Murphy Brown
- Daniel K. Riskin (Ph.D.) – evolutionary biologist and television personality, known for co-hosting the Canadian television series Daily Planet
- Casey Robinson – producer, director and screenwriter
- Elizabeth Allen Rosenbaum (B.A.) – director
- William Sadler (M.F.A. 1974) – actor, known for films including The Shawshank Redemption
- Gene Saks (B.A. 1943) – stage and film director; inductee of the American Theater Hall of Fame; seven-time nominee and three-time winner of Tony Award; four-time nominee of Drama Desk Award
- Andrea Savage (B.A. Political Science and Spanish, minor in Law Studies) – actress, Dog Bites Man
- Dick Schaap (B.S. 1955) – sports newscaster on ABC and ESPN, two Emmy Awards, author and co-author of 33 books
- Robert Frederic Schenkkan Jr. (M.F.A 1977) – award-winning playwright, screenwriter, and actor; the Pulitzer Prize for Drama (1992) for his work The Kentucky Cycle, and the Tony Award for Best Play (2014) for his drama All the Way earned
- Bert Schneider – film and television producer, Academy Award for Best Documentary Feature for producing Hearts and Minds (1975)
- Thelma Schoonmaker (B.A. 1961) – film editor, received the Academy Award for Raging Bull, The Aviator, and The Departed
- David Seidler (1959) – screenwriter who won 83rd Academy Award for Best Original Screenplay for The Kings Speech (2010)
- Robert Smigel (undergrad 1978–80, transferred) – puppeteer behind Triumph the Insult Comic Dog; first head writer of Late Night with Conan O'Brien; author of "TV Funhouse" animations on Saturday Night Live
- Jimmy Smits (M.F.A. 1982) – actor
- Tim Squyres (B.A. 1981) – Academy Award-nominated film editor, best known for Crouching Tiger, Hidden Dragon
- Yale Summers (Bachelor's Business with honors, 1955) – actor and governing member of the Screen Actors Guild
- Ken Sunshine (1970) – publicist
- Dominique Thorne (B.S. 2019) –actress, known primarily as Riri Williams/Ironheart in the Marvel Cinematic Universe
- Jennifer Tipton (B.A. 1958) – award-winning theatre and dance lighting designer; MacArthur Fellowship (2008)
- Franchot Tone (B.A. 1927) – actor, nominated for the Academy Award for Best Actor for Mutiny on the Bounty
- Ming Tsai (hotel administration) – celebrity chef of Ming's Quest, a cooking show featured on the Fine Living Network, and Simply Ming on American Public Television
- Jerry Wasserman (Ph.D. English Literature) – film and television actor; also professor and head of the Department of Theatre and Film at the University of British Columbia
- Andrew Weinberg (B.A. 1998) – television writer and co-winner of Primetime Emmy Award for Outstanding Writing for a Variety Series (2007)
- Pete van Wieren – sportscaster and sports reporter, best known for 33-year career calling play-by-play for Major League Baseball's Atlanta Braves
- David Wild – writer and critic in the music and television industries, nominated for an Emmy Award for his work on America: A Tribute to Heroes
- Sheri Wilner – playwright
- Walt Witcover – theatre educator, né Walter Witcover Scheinman
- Mary Woronov (did not graduate) – actress, member of Andy Warhol's The Factory
- Paula Vogel (1976, M.A, 2016, Ph.D.) – playwright who won the Pulitzer Prize for Drama for her play, How I Learned to Drive (1998)
- Teddy Zee (B.S. 1979) – film producer, media and technology executive

=== Music ===
Harry Chapin

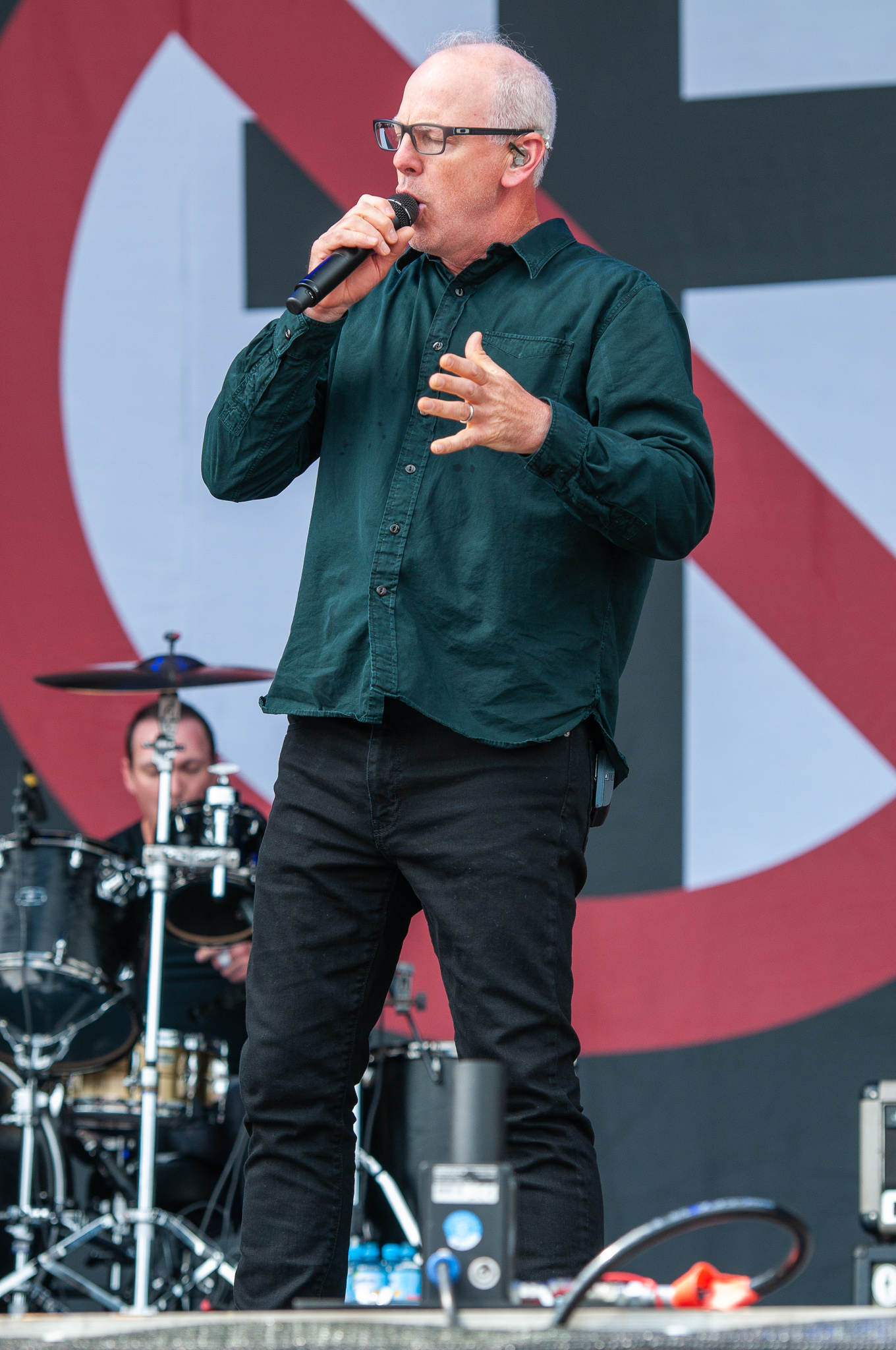
Greg Graffin

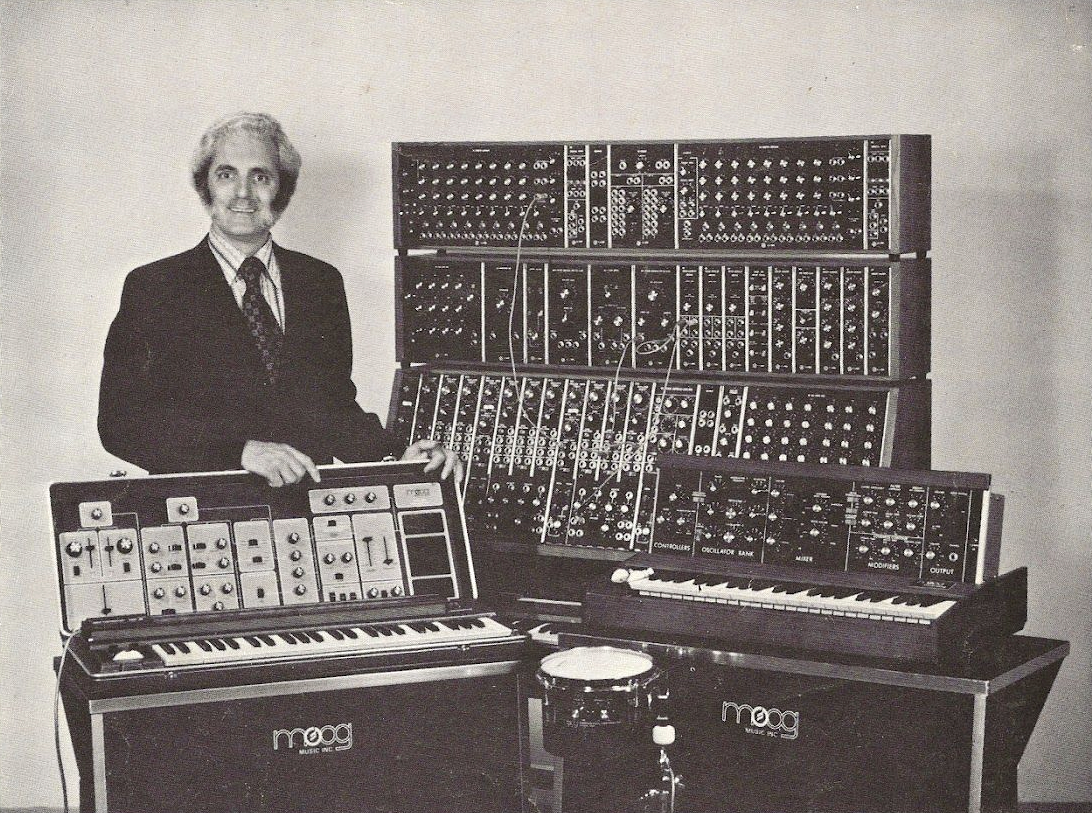
Robert Moog

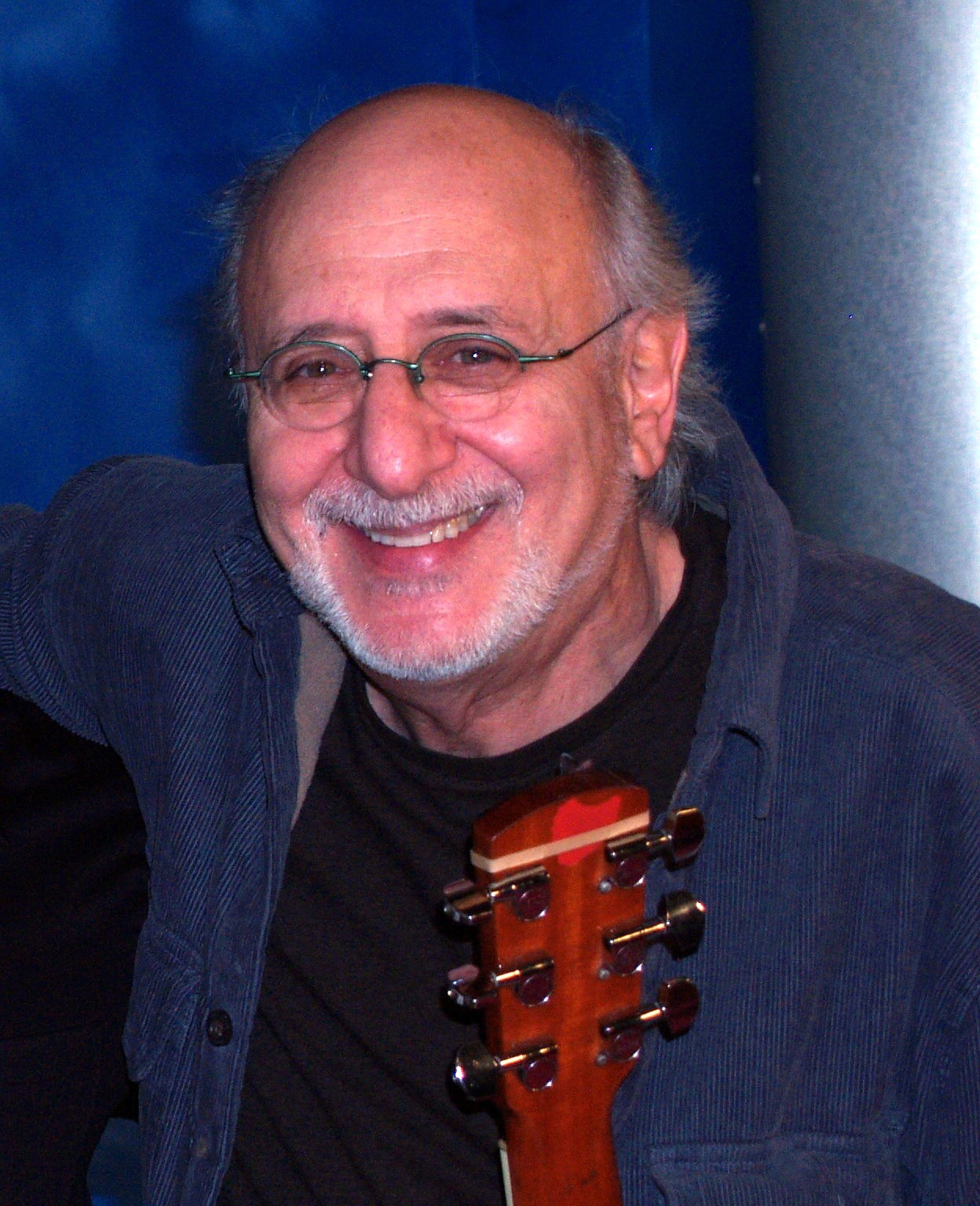
Peter Yarrow

- Ron Altbach (’68, B.A. '69) – keyboardist and songwriter, member of rock band King Harvest, co-founded with fellow Cornell undergraduates Ed Tuleja, Dave Robinson, and Rod Novak
- Robert Alexander Anderson (1916) – composer, wrote Christmas song "Mele Kalikimaka"
- Russ Barenberg – Grammy–nominated bluegrass musician
- Herbert Barrett (B.A. 1930) – talent manager for hundreds of famous artists from the 1930s to 2000s
- Harry Chapin (did not graduate) – folk musician known for the song "Cat's in the Cradle"
- Henrique de Curitiba (M.F.A. 1981) – composer
- Mack David – eight-time Academy Award nominee for songs including "Bibbidi Bobbidi Boo"
- Jeremy Dussolliet (B.S. 2009) – Grammy-nominated singer-songwriter and member of the duo Kinetics & One Love
- Jared Emerson-Johnson (B.A. 2003) – video game music composer
- Richard Fariña – folk musician
- Joscelyn Godwin (Ph.D. 1969 musicology) – musicologist, translator, historian of the esoteric
- Greg Graffin (Ph.D. 1991 evolutionary biology) – lead singer and co-founder of Bad Religion
- Laurens Hammond (B.S. 1916 mechanical engineering) – inventor of the Hammond organ
- Jesse Harris (B.A.) – Grammy Award-winning songwriter who wrote "Don't Know Why" and "Come Away with Me", songs popularized by the artist Norah Jones
- Ari Hest (attended, transferred) – singer-songwriter
- John S. Hilliard (D.M.A. 1983) – classical composer
- Barry Kernfeld (M.A. 1978, Ph.D. 1981) – musicologist, jazz saxophonist, known for writing The New Grove Dictionary of Jazz
- Alex Kresovich (B.S. 2008) – music producer and songwriter
- Huey Lewis (undergrad 1967–69, dropped out) – rock musician and member of Huey Lewis and the News
- Robert Moog (Ph.D. 1965) – inventor of the Moog synthesizer and founder of Moog Music
- Charles Previn (B.A. 1910) – Academy Award-winning film composer, seven-time Academy Award nominee
- Steve Reich (B.A. 1957) – Pulitzer Prize-winning composer, and one of the pioneers of minimal music; recipient of the BBVA Foundation Frontiers of Knowledge Award (2013)
- Christopher Rouse (D.M.A. 1977) – classical composer; winner of the Pulitzer Prize for Music
- Cary Sherman (1968) – chairman and CEO of the Recording Industry Association of America
- Tim Sommers (B.S. 2010) – Grammy-nominated producer/songwriter and member of the duo Kinetics & One Love
- Oliver Strunk (attended 1917–1919 and in 1927) – musicologist who was on the faculty of Princeton University 1937–1966; founding member and president (1959–1960) of the American Musicological Society
- Steven Stucky (D.M.A. 1978; professor of Music Composition) – Pulitzer Prize-winning composer
- Gil Trythall (D.M.A. 1960) – composer and pianist
- Paul Francis Webster (undergrad 1927–1928, transferred) – Academy and Grammy Award-winning lyricist
- Peter Yarrow (B.A. 1959) – folk singer, member of Peter, Paul and Mary
- Andy Zax (B.A. 1986) twice-Grammy–nominated producer and music historian, known for his complete audio restoration of the Woodstock Festival

=== Other ===
- Jason Rohrer (B.S. 2000, M.E. 2001) – video game designer
- Dave Ross – talk show host on KIRO-FM

== Government and politics ==
=== Heads of state ===
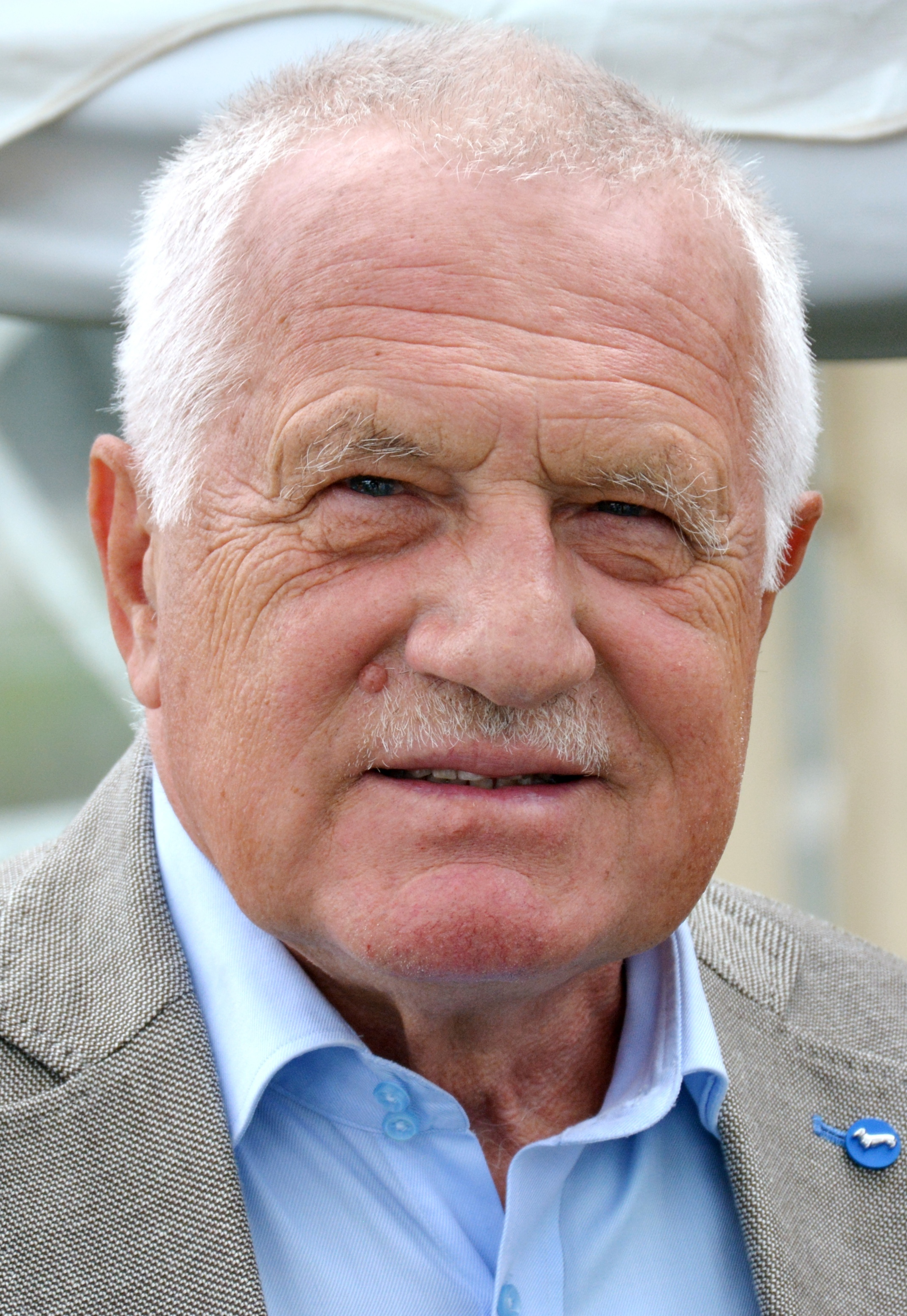
Václav Klaus

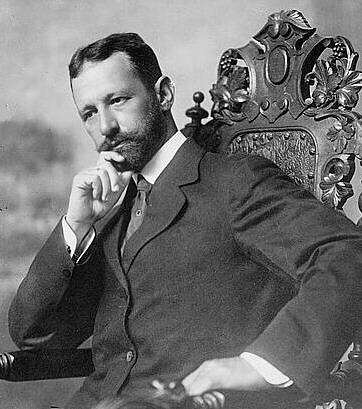
Mario García Menocal

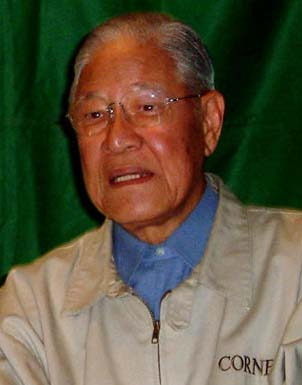
Lee Teng-Hui

- Jamshid Amouzegar (B.S. 1945 engineering, Ph.D. 1951) – prime minister of Iran 1977–1978
- Choi Sang-mok (Ph.D. economics 1996) – acting president of South Korea and acting prime minister of South Korea
- Václav Klaus (1969, no degree) – president of the Czech Republic 2003–2013 and prime minister of the Czech Republic 1992–1997
- Lee Ju-ho (Ph.D. economics 1990) – acting president of South Korea and acting prime minister of South Korea
- Lee Teng-hui (Ph.D. 1968 agricultural economics) – president of the Republic of China 1988–2000
- Mario García Menocal (B.S. 1888 engineering) – president of Cuba 1913–1921
- Tsai Ing-Wen (LL.M. 1980) – president of the Republic of China 2016–2024

=== U.S. cabinet and cabinet-level ranks ===
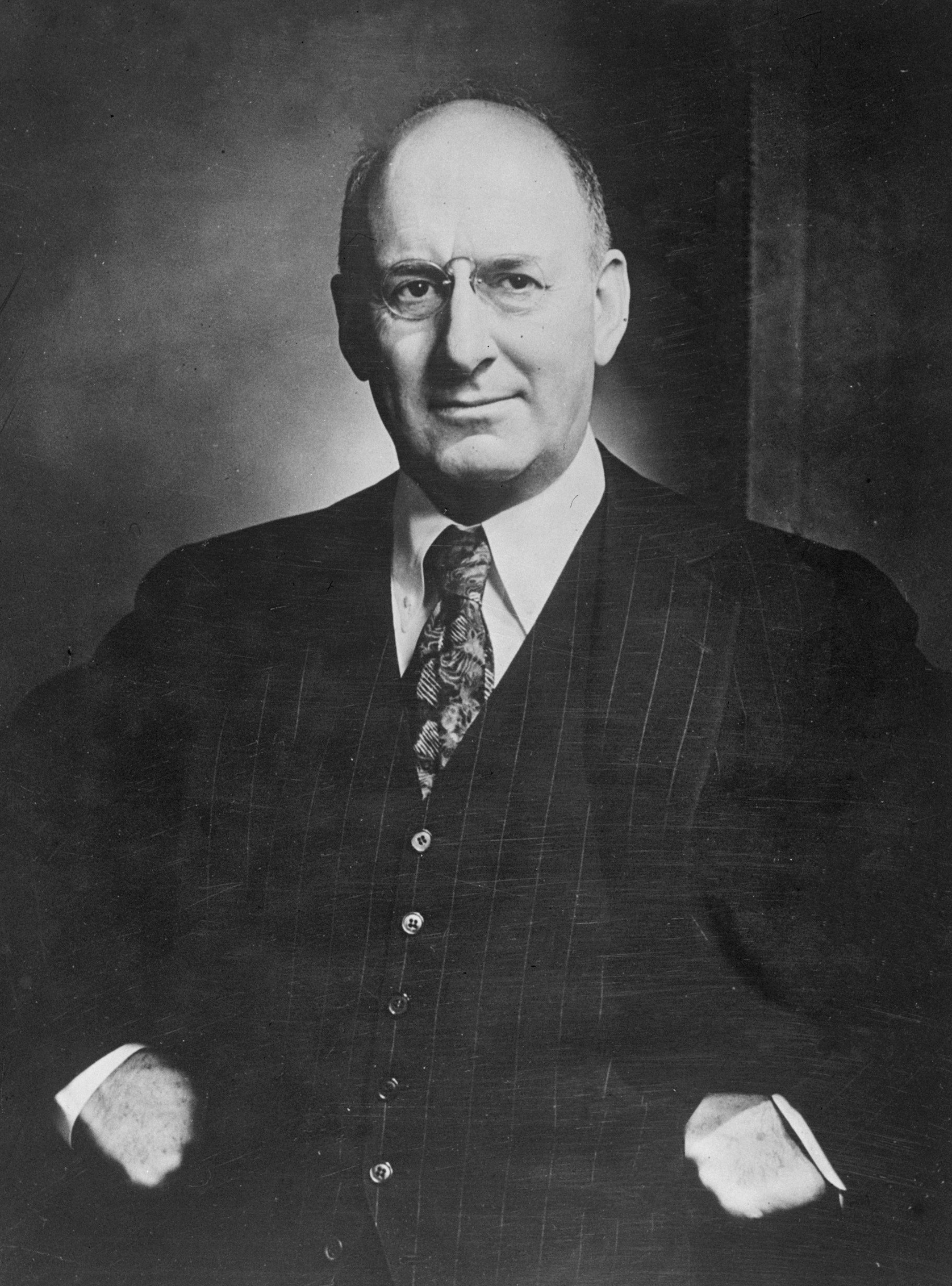
Henry Morgenthau Jr.

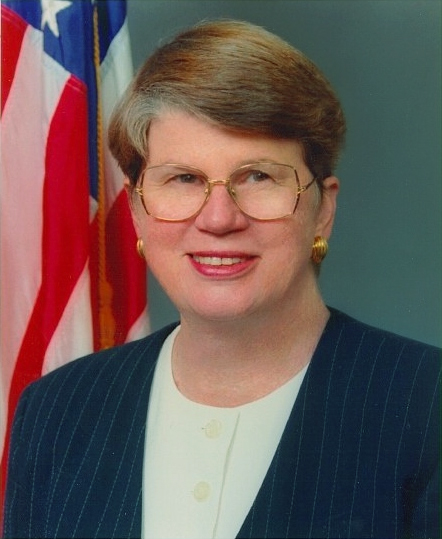
Janet Reno

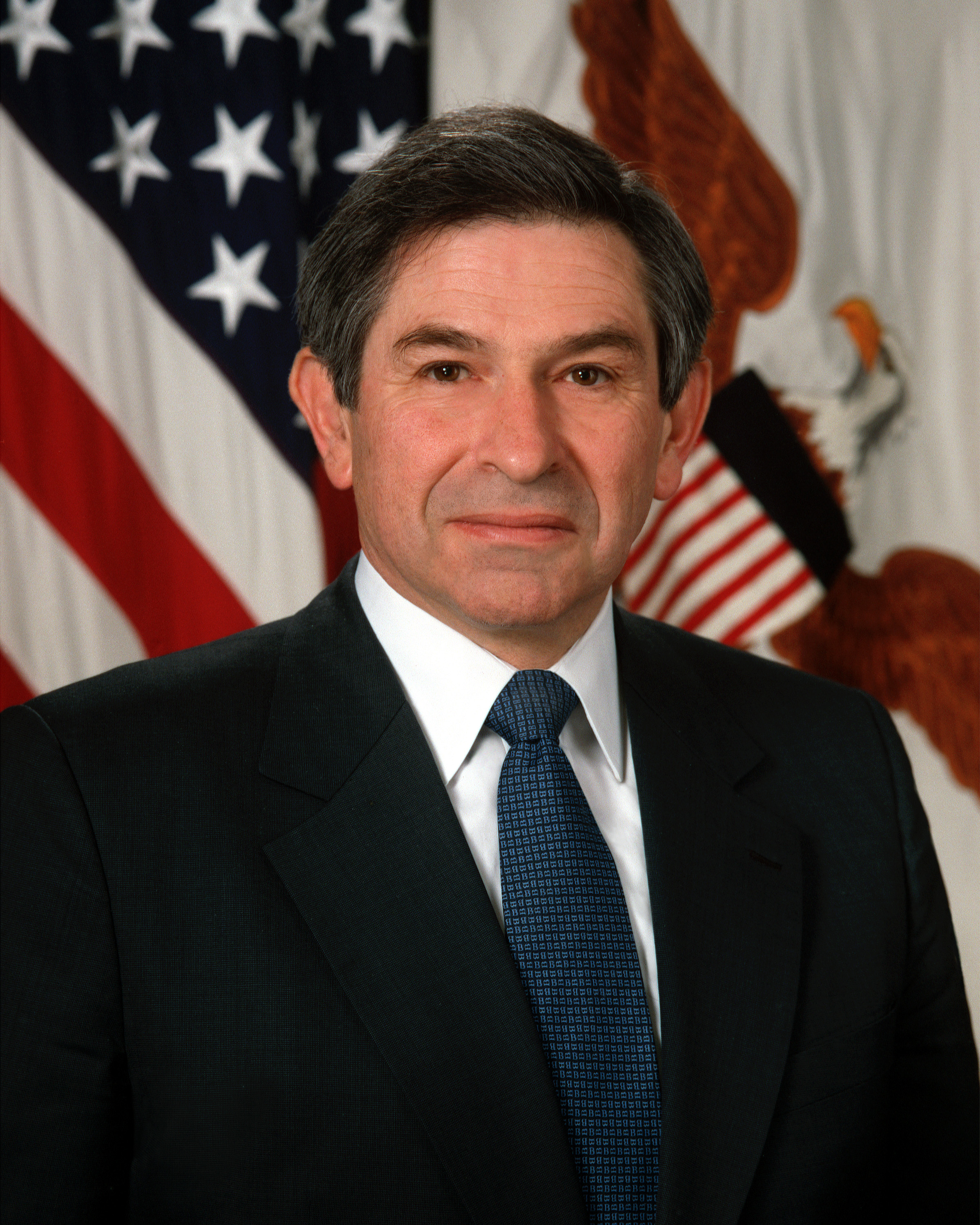
Paul Wolfowitz

- Sandy Berger (B.A. 1967) – National Security advisor to President Bill Clinton (1997–2001)
- Samuel Bodman (B.S. 1961) – United States secretary of energy (2005–09), U.S. deputy secretary of the treasury (2004–05), U.S. deputy secretary of commerce (2001–03)
- Jim Bridenstine (M.B.A.) – administrator of NASA (2013–18)
- Lincoln D. Faurer (attended, did not graduate) – director of the National Security Agency and chief of the Central Security Service (1981–85)
- W. Scott Gould (B.A.) – U.S. deputy secretary of Veterans Affairs (2009–13)
- Stephen Hadley (B.A. 1969) – National Security advisor to President George W. Bush (2005–09)
- Seth Harris (B.S. 1983) – acting United States secretary of labor (2013), deputy secretary of labor (2009–14)
- Eugene Kinckle Jones (M.A. 1908) – member of President Franklin D. Roosevelt's Black Cabinet, executive secretary of the National Urban League, founder of Alpha Phi Alpha fraternity
- C. Everett Koop (M.D. 1941) – Surgeon General of the United States (1982–89), recipient of the Tyler Prize for Environmental Achievement (1991)
- Henry Morgenthau Jr. (undergraduate 1909–10, 1912–13, dropped out) – U.S. secretary of the treasury (1934–45)
- Edmund Muskie (LL.B. 1939) – United States secretary of state (1980–81), senator from Maine (1959–80), United States vice presidential candidate (1968), governor of Maine (1955–59)
- James Peake (M.D. 1972) – Surgeon General of the United States Army (2000–04), U.S. secretary of Veterans Affairs (2007–09)
- Samuel Pierce (B.A. 1947, J.D. 1949) – secretary of Housing and Urban Development (1981–89)
- Thomas C. Reed (B.S. 1956) – secretary of the Air Force (1976–77)
- Janet Reno (B.A. 1960) – United States attorney general (1993–2001)
- William P. Rogers (LL.B. 1937) – United States attorney general (1957–61), United States secretary of state (1969–73), Presidential Medal of Freedom (1973)
- Louis Wade Sullivan (Medical College resident) – secretary of Health and Human Services (1989–93); founder, dean, and president of Morehouse School of Medicine
- Nancy Sutley (B.A.) – chair of the Council on Environmental Quality (2009–14)
- Daniel I. Werfel (B.S. 1993) – commissioner of the Internal Revenue Service (2023–25), acting commissioner of the Internal Revenue Service (2013)
- John P. White (B.S. 1959) – deputy secretary of Defense (1995–97)
- Paul Wolfowitz (B.A. 1965) – deputy secretary of Defense (2001–05), president of the World Bank (2005–07)

=== U.S. governors ===
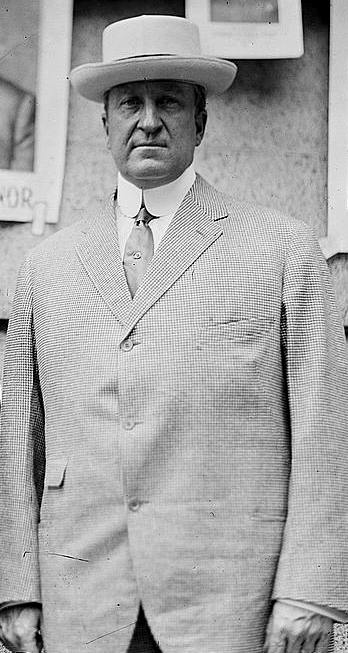
John Alden Dix

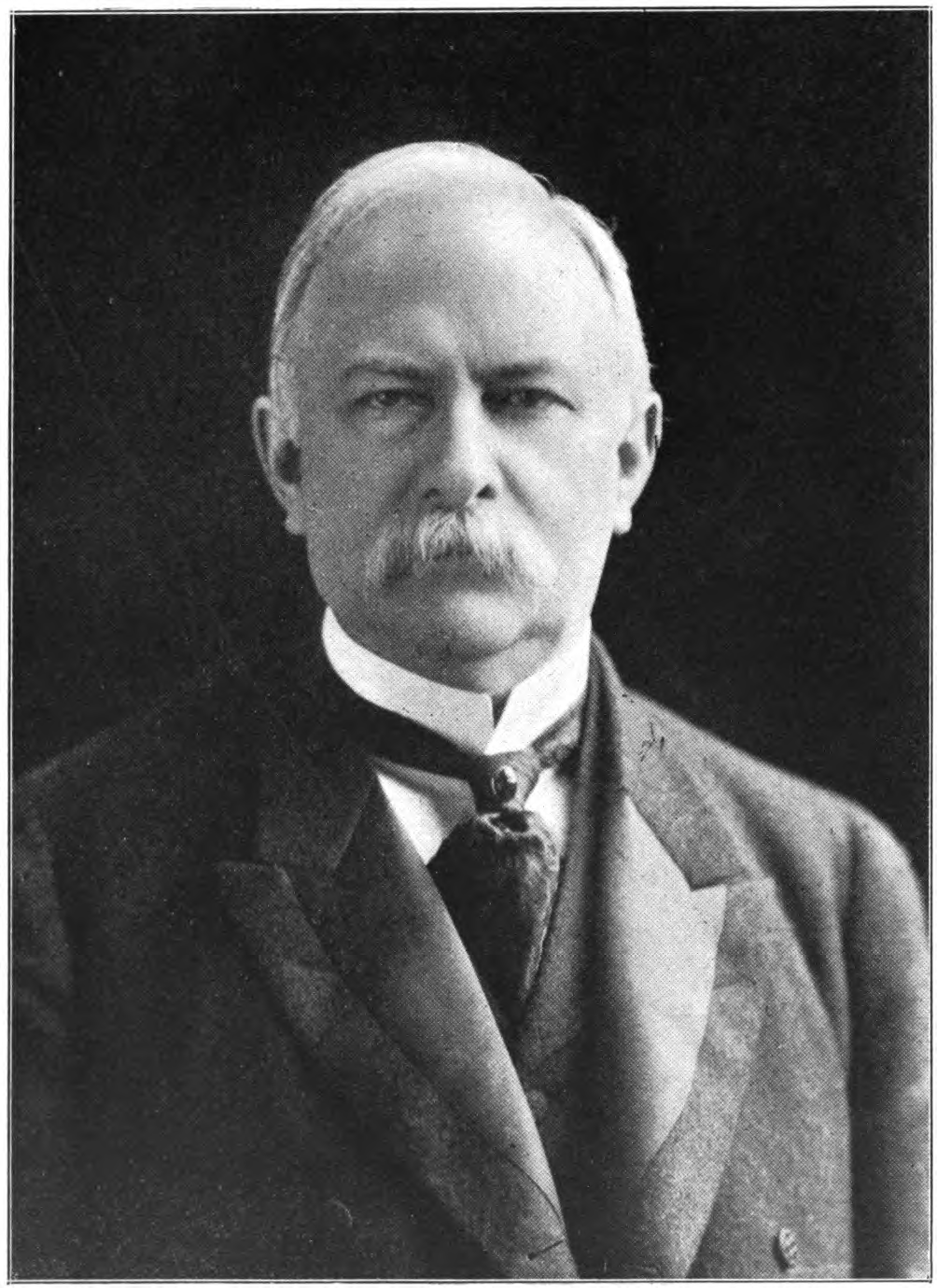
Joseph B. Foraker

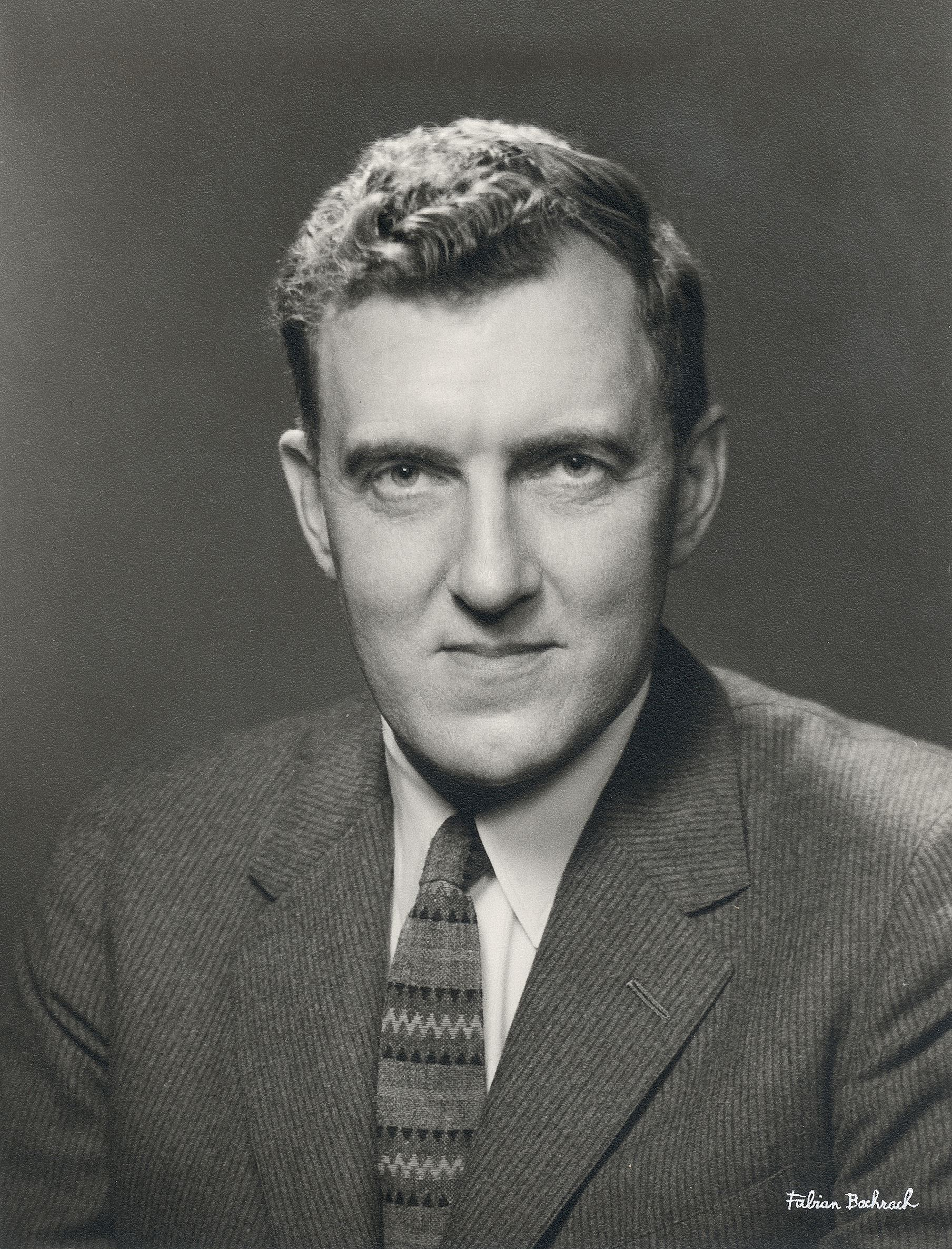
Edmund Muskie

- John Alden Dix (attended 1879–1882) – governor of New York (1911–12)
- Joseph B. Foraker (B.A. 1869) – governor of Ohio (1886–90), U.S. senator from Ohio (1897–1909), member of Cornell University's first graduating class
- James Benton Grant (attended 1873–1874) – governor of Colorado (1883–85)
- Herbert James Hagerman (1890) – governor of the New Mexico Territory (1906–07)
- Philip H. Hoff (J.D. 1951) – governor of Vermont (1963–69)
- Goodwin Knight (graduate study 1919–20) – governor of California (1953–59)
- John T. Morrison (LL.B. degree 1890) – governor of Idaho (1903–05)
- Edmund Muskie (LL.B. 1939) – governor of Maine (1955–59), United States secretary of state (1980–81), U.S. senator from Maine (1959–80), United States vice presidential candidate (1968)
- Chuck Robb (undergraduate 1957–58, transferred) – governor of Virginia (1982–86), U.S. senator from Virginia (1989–2001)
- Horace White (1887) – governor of New York (1910), lieutenant governor of New York (1909–10), New York state senator (1896–1908)

=== U.S. senators ===
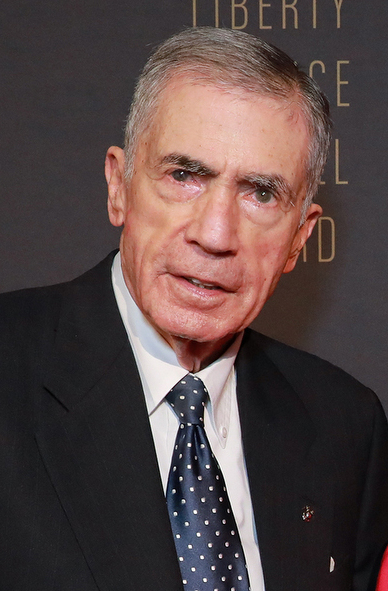
Chuck Robb

- Joseph B. Foraker (B.A. 1869) – senator from Ohio (1897–1909), governor of Ohio (1886–90), member of Cornell University's first graduating class
- Thomas C. Hennings Jr. (1924) – senator from Missouri (1951–60), U.S. representative from Missouri (1935–40)
- Mark Kirk (B.A. 1981) – senator from Illinois (2011–17), U.S. representative from Illinois (2001–11)
- Edmund Muskie (LL.B. 1939) – senator from Maine (1959–80), United States secretary of state (1980–81), United States vice presidential candidate (1968), governor of Maine (1955–59)
- Chuck Robb (undergraduate 1957–58, transferred) – senator from Virginia (1989–2001), governor of Virginia (1982–86)
- Elissa Slotkin (B.A. 1998) – senator from Michigan (2025–present), U.S. representative from Michigan (2019–2025), assistant secretary of Defense for International Security Affairs (2014–17)

=== U.S. representatives ===
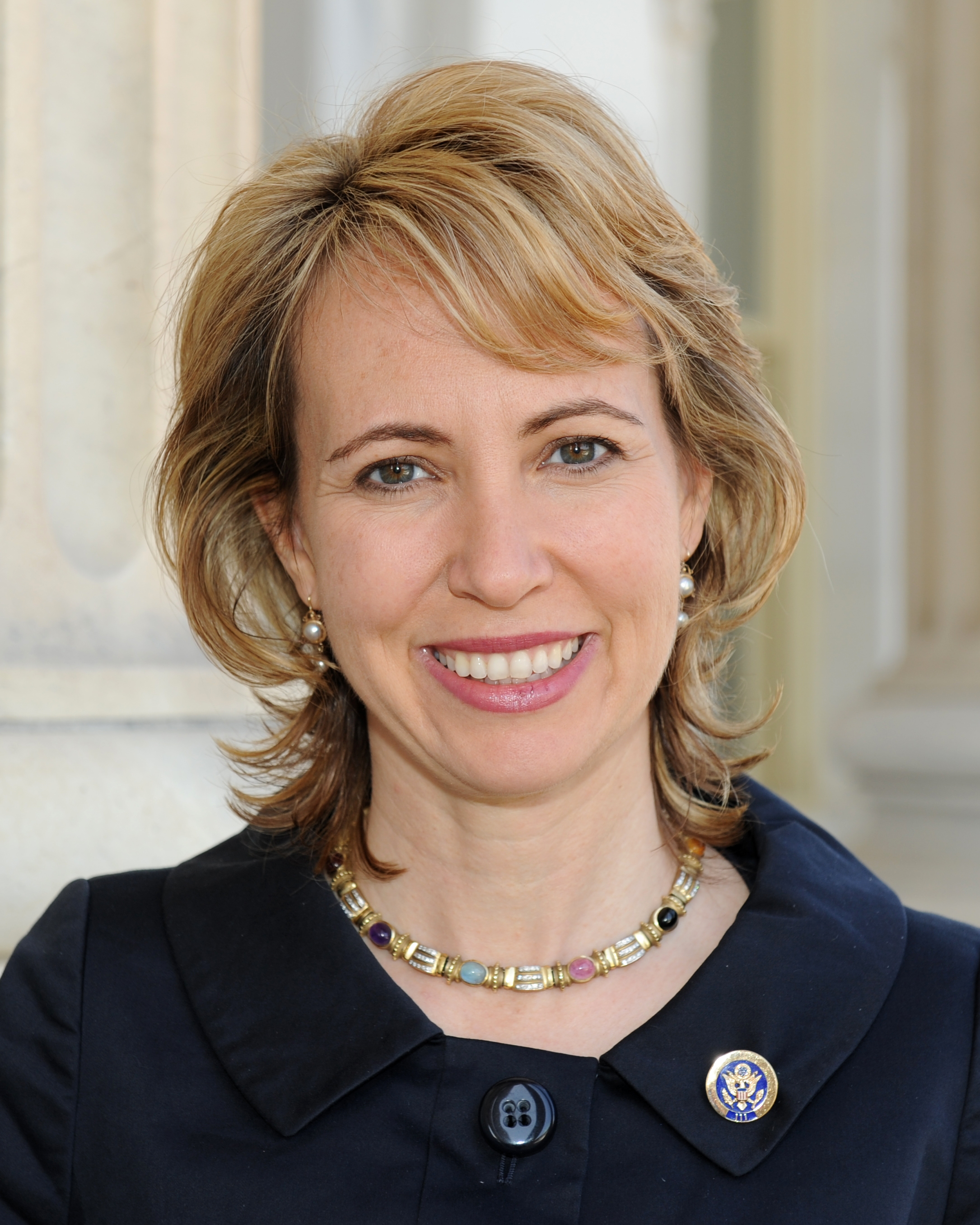
Gabby Giffords

- John G. Alexander (J.D. 1916) – representative from Minnesota (1939–41)
- Rob Andrews (J.D. 1982) – representative from New Jersey (1990–2014)
- Andrew Biemiller (B.A. 1926) – representative from Wisconsin (1945–47, 1949–51)
- Jim Bridenstine (M.B.A) – representative from Oklahoma (2013–18), administrator of NASA (2018–21)
- Frederick Van Ness Bradley (1921) – representative from Michigan (1939–47)
- Abraham Lincoln Brick (undergrad) – representative from Indiana (1899–1908)
- Katherine Clark (J.D.) – representative from Massachusetts (2013–present), U.S. House of Representatives minority whip (2023–present), assistant speaker of the United States House of Representatives (2021–23)
- Hansen Clarke (B.F.A.) – representative from Michigan (2010–13)
- Barber Conable (B.A. 1942, LL.B. 1948) – representative from New York (1965–85), president of the World Bank (1986–91)
- Maurice Connolly (1897) – representative from Iowa (1913–15)
- Sharice Davids (J.D. 2010) – representative from Kansas (2019–present)
- Thomas Joseph Downey (B.S. 1970) – representative from New York (1975–93)
- Beth Van Duyne (1995) – representative from Texas (2021–present)
- Bob Filner (B.A. 1963, Ph.D. 1973) – representative from California (1993–2012), mayor of San Diego (2012–13)
- Chris Gibson (MPA 1995, M.A. 1996, Ph.D. 1998) – representative from New York (2011–17), President of Siena College (2020–23)
- Gabby Giffords (M.R.P. 1996) – representative from Arizona (2007–12), member of the Arizona Senate (2003–05), member of the Arizona House of Representatives (2001–03)
- Norman Judd Gould (M.E. 1899) – representative from New York (1915–23)
- Gilbert Gude (B.S. 1948) – representative from Maryland (1967–77)
- Edwin Arthur Hall – representative from New York (1939–53)
- Nan Hayworth (M.D. 1985) – representative from New York (2011–13)
- Joseph Clifford Hendrix (1870–73, trustee) – representative from New York (1893–95)
- Lewis Henry (1909) – representative from New York (1922–23)
- Frank Horton (L.L.B. 1947) – representative from New York (1963–93)
- Wesley Hunt (M.P.A. 2015, M.B.A. 2015, M.I.L.R. 2016) – representative from Texas (2023–present)
- Charles Samuel Joelson (B.A. 1937, L.L.B. 1939) – representative from New Jersey (1961–69)
- Clarence Evans Kilburn (1916) – representative from New York (1940–65)
- Gary Alcide Lee (graduate study 1963) – representative from New York (1979–83)
- Norman F. Lent (L.L.B. 1957) – representative from New York (1971–93)
- Richard Dean McCarthy (graduate study) – representative from New York (1965–71)
- Dan Meuser (B.A. 1988) – representative from Pennsylvania (2019–present)
- Clement Woodnutt Miller (B.S. 1946) – representative from California (1959–62)
- Robert J. Mrazek (B.A. 1967) – representative from New York (1983–93)
- James R. Olin (B.E.E. 1943) – representative from Virginia (1983–93)
- Richard Ottinger (B.A. 1950) – representative from New York (1965–71, 1975–85); founder and second staff member of the Peace Corps (1961–64), dean of Pace Law School (1994–99)
- James Parker (1887) – representative from New York (1913–33)
- Edward Worthington Pattison (B.A. 1953, L.L.B. 1957) – representative from New York (1975–79)
- John Raymond Pillion (L.L.B. 1927) – representative from New York (1953–65)
- Alexander Pirnie (1924, J.D. 1926) – representative from New York (1959–73)
- Daniel A. Reed (1898) – representative from New York (1919–59)
- Henry Schoellkopf Reuss (B.A. 1933) – representative from Wisconsin (1955–83)
- Howard Winfield Robison (B.A. 1937, LL.B. 1939) – representative from New York (1958–75)
- James A. Roe (School of Military Aeronautics 1917) – representative from New York (1945–47)
- Kurt Schrader (B.A. 1973) – representative from Oregon (2009–23), member of the Oregon Senate (2003–08), member of the Oregon House of Representatives (1997–2003)
- George Shiras III (1881) – representative from Pennsylvania (1903–05)
- Henry P. Smith III (Law 1936) – representative from New York (1965–75)
- James H. Southard (law 1874) – representative from Ohio (1895–1907)
- Melanie Stansbury (M.S. 2007) – representative from New Mexico (2021–present), member of the New Mexico House of Representatives (2019–21)
- Sam Steiger (attended two years) – representative from Arizona (1946–47)
- Elmer E. Studley (1894) – representative from New York (1933–35)
- Frank Sundstrom (1924) – representative from New Jersey (1943–49)
- George Ernest Waldo (1872) – representative from New York (1905–1909), member of the New York State Assembly (1896)
- John De Witt Warner (1872) – representative from New York (1891–95)
- John S. Wold (M.S. 1939) – representative from Wyoming (1969–71)

=== Diplomats ===
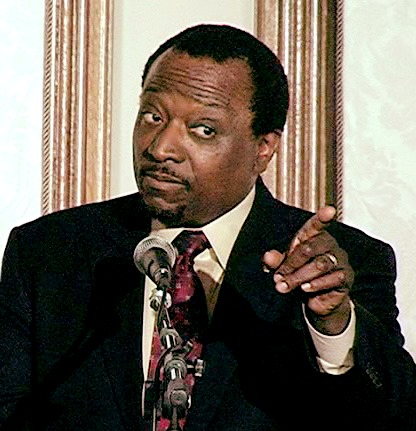
Alan Keyes

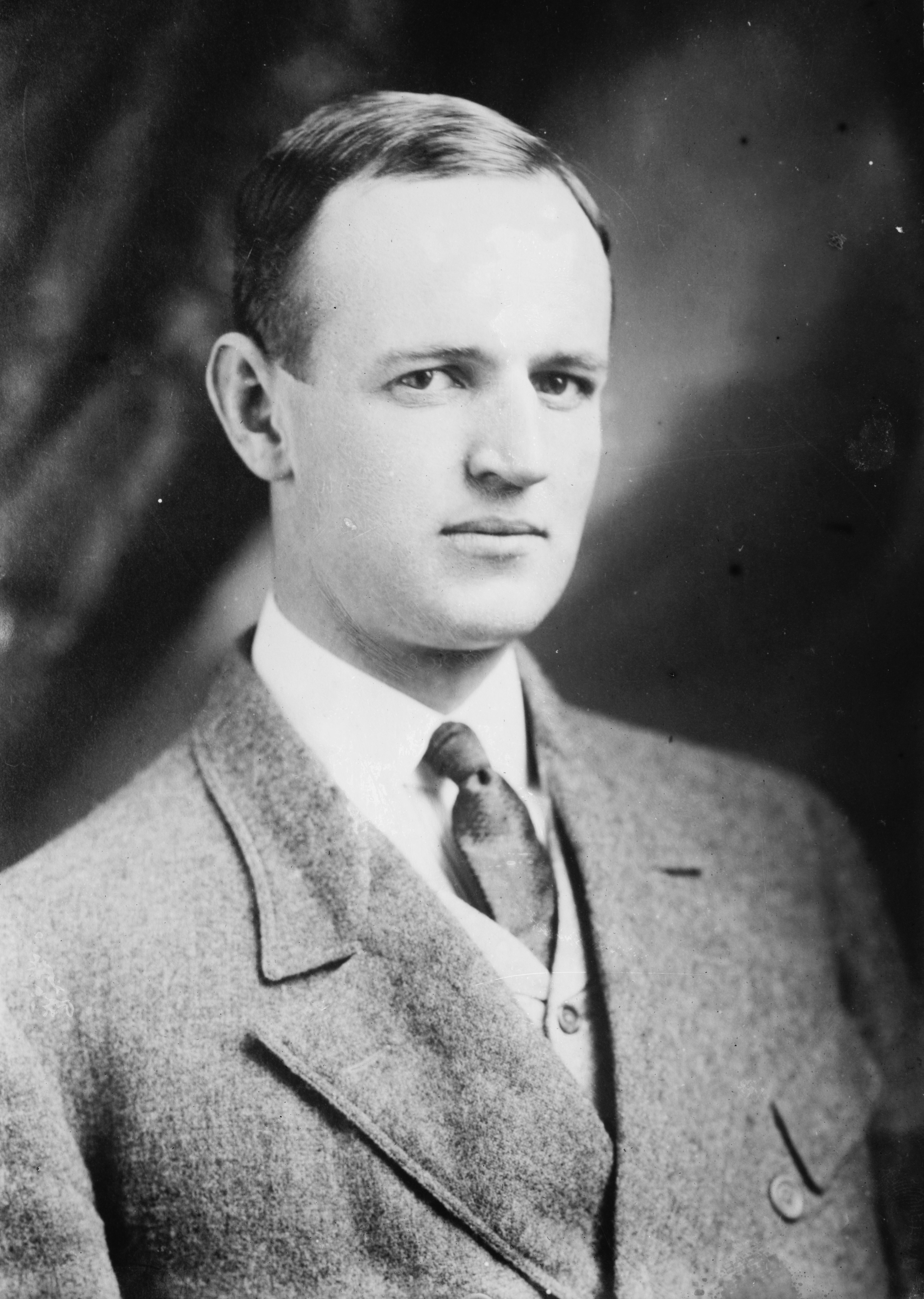
Willard Dickerman Straight

- Parker W. Borg (MPA 1965) – U.S. ambassador to Mali (1981–1984) and Iceland (1993–1996)
- William Brownfield (1974) – U.S. ambassador to Chile (2002–2004), Venezuela (2004–2007), and Colombia (2007–2010)
- Richard Burt (B.A. 1969) – U.S. ambassador to Germany (1985–1989); chief negotiator of the Strategic Arms Reduction Treaty (rank of ambassador); assistant secretary of state for European and Canadian Affairs (1983–1985)
- Dwight L. Bush Sr. (B.A. 1979) – businessman; U.S. ambassador to Morocco (2014– )
- Henry A. Byroade (M.S. 1940 civil engineering) – career diplomat serving as U.S. ambassador to Egypt (1955–1956), South Africa (1956–1959), Afghanistan (1959–1962), Burma (1963–1968), Philippines (1969–1973), Pakistan (1973–1977)
- Timothy M. Carney (1975–1976 Southeast Asian studies) – U.S. ambassador to SUdan (1995–1997), United States Ambassador to Haiti (1998–1999)
- Chan Heng Chee (M.A. 1967 government) – Singapore's ambassador to the U.S. (1996–2012) and to Mexico (1989–1991)
- Arthur Hobson Dean (B.A. 1921, L.L.B. 1923) – international law expert, chief U.S. negotiator at Panmunjeom, assisted with negotiations for Nuclear Test Ban Treaty, delegate to the United Nations
- Eric S. Edelman (B.A. 1972 history) – U.S. ambassador to Finland (1998–2001), Turkey (2003–2005)
- Glenn W. Ferguson (B.A. 1950 economics, MBA 1951) – U.S. ambassador to Kenya, 1966–1969, academic administrator
- Robert Ford (M.A. 1940 history) – Canadian ambassador to Colombia (1957–1959), Yugoslavia (1959–1961), Egypt and Sudan (1961–1964), the USSR (1964–1980) and Mongolia (1974–1980); Companion of the Order of Canada
- Daniel Fried (B.A. 1974) – career diplomat; U.S. ambassador to Poland (1997–2000)
- William vanden Heuvel (Bachelor and Law, editor-in-chief of Cornell Law Review) – U.S. ambassador to the European office of the United Nations (1977–79) and U.S. deputy ambassador to the United Nations (1979–1981)
- John H. Holdridge (1948–1950 Chinese language) – U.S. ambassador to Singapore (1975–1978), Indonesia (1982–1986)
- Jerome H. Holland (B.S. 1939, M.S. 1941) – first black member of the New York Stock Exchange; president of Delaware State University (1953–60) and Hampton University (1960–70); U.S. ambassador to Sweden, 1970–73; chairman of the American Red Cross, 1979–85
- Hu Shih (B.A. 1914) – China's ambassador to the U.S., 1938–42; philosopher; poet
- Makila James ('79) – U.S. ambassador to Swaziland (2012–2016)
- Alan Keyes (undergrad 1968–69, transferred) – diplomat, U.S. presidential candidate, 1996, 2000; U.S. Senate candidate from Maryland (1988, 1992) and Illinois (2004)
- Edwin Jackson Kyle (M.S. 1902) – U.S. ambassador to Guatemala, 1945–48; namesake of Kyle Field
- Sol Linowitz (J.D. 1938, trustee, 1966–95) – diplomat, ambassador, chairman of Xerox, 1960–66; Presidential Medal of Freedom recipient, 1998
- Simon Mbilinyi (BSc) – Tanzanian ambassador to Belgium and Luxembourg, 1985–1989; minister of Finance (1995–1996)
- C. Steven McGann (1975–1978 graduate studies) – U.S. ambassador to Fiji, Kiribati, Nauru, Tonga, and Tuvalu (2008–2011)
- Francisco de Miguel (M.A. 1985) – Spanish career diplomat, Spain's ambassador to Libya
- Cameron Munter (B.A. 1976) – United States Ambassador to Serbia (2007–2009), U.S. ambassador to Pakistan (2010–2012)
- Michael Punke (J.D. 1989) – United States ambassador to the World Trade Organization (2011– )
- G. Frederick Reinhardt (M.A. 1935) – career diplomat, U.S. ambassador to South Vietnam (1955–1957), the United Arab Republic and North Yemen (1960–1961), and Italy (1961–1968)
- Ali Jehangir Siddiqui – ambassador of Pakistan to the United States (2018), diplomat, businessman, special assistant to the prime minister of Pakistan (2017–2018), Pakistan's ambassador at-large for Foreign Investment (2019–2022)
- Moncrieff J. Spear (B.A. 1946) – former diplomat
- Willard Dickerman Straight (B.Arch. 1901) – diplomat, investment banker, publisher, World War I veteran, namesake of Willard Straight Hall
- Sao-Ke Alfred Sze (B.A. 1901) – China's ambassador to the U.S. and later UK; founding member of World Bank; first Chinese student to attend Cornell
- Sandra Louise Vogelgesang – U.S. ambassador to Nepal (1994–1997)

=== Other U.S. government officials ===
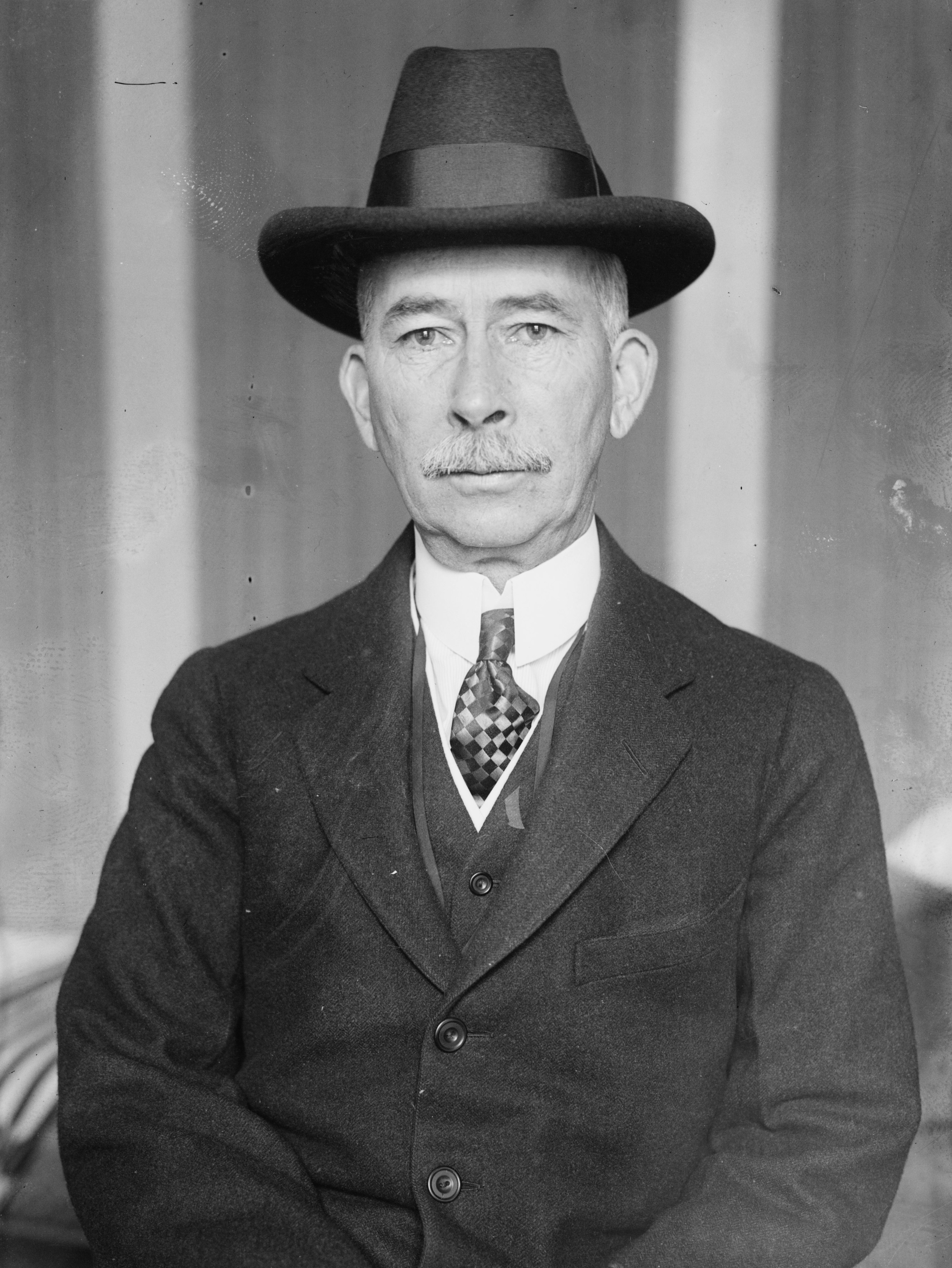
Edward M. House

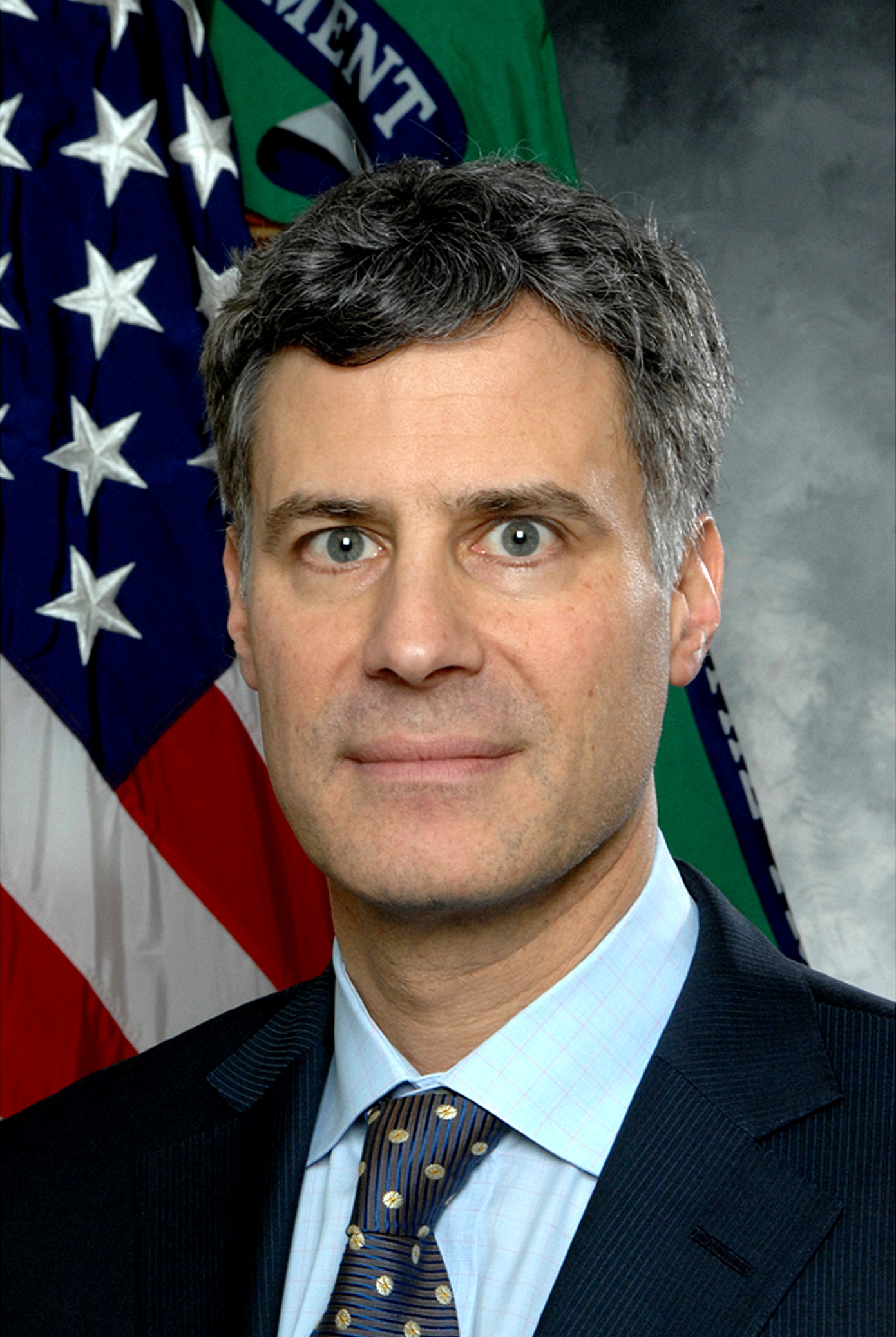
Alan B. Krueger

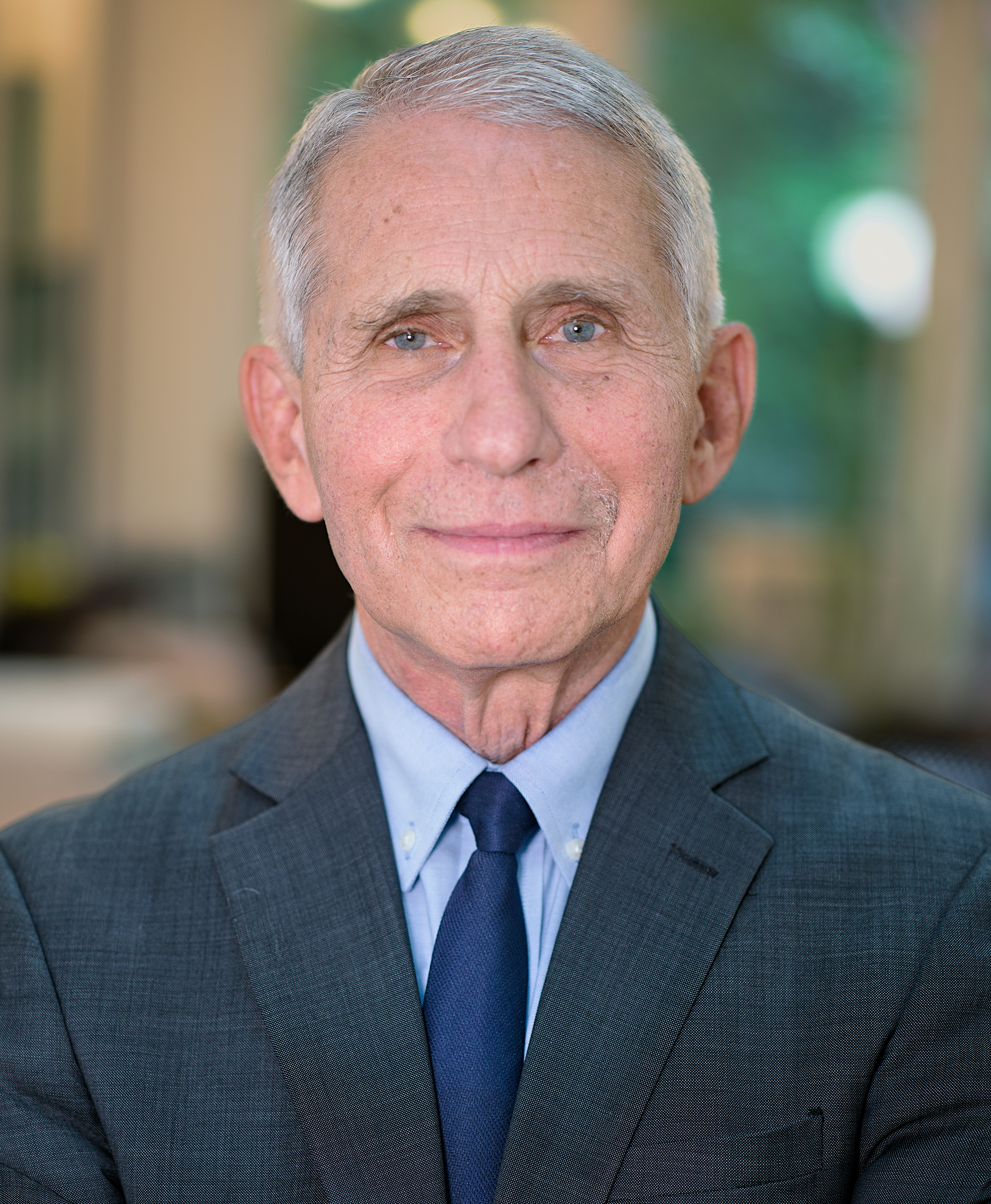
Anthony Fauci

- Michael Atkinson (J.D. 1991) – inspector general of the Intelligence Community, involved in the Trump–Ukraine scandal
- Terry Calvani (J.D. 1972) – commissioner of the Federal Trade Commission (1983–1990)
- Robert Cardillo (B.A. 1983 government) – director of the National Geospatial-Intelligence Agency (2014–2019)
- Arun Chaudhary (B.A. 1997) – White House official videographer
- Derek Chollet (B.A. 1993) – assistant secretary of Defense for International Security Affairs (2012–2014)
- David S. Cohen (B.A. 1985, Government) – deputy director of the CIA (2015–2017, 2021–), Assistant Secretary for Terrorist Financing (2009–2011)
- Walter Cruickshank (B.A. Geological Sciences) – deputy director, then acting director of US Bureau of Ocean Energy Management
- Elizabeth B. Drewry (Ph.D. 1933) – archivist with the National Archives and director of the Franklin D. Roosevelt Presidential Library and Museum
- Anthony Fauci (M.D. 1966) – chief medical advisor to the U.S. president during the COVID-19 pandemic
- Stephen Friedman (B.A. 1959; trustee, 1993–) – chairman of the Goldman Sachs Group, 1990–94; chairman of the President's Foreign Intelligence Advisory Board (2005–09); former assistant for Economic Policy to President George W. Bush (2002–04); director of the United States National Economic Council, 2003–04
- W. Scott Gould (B.A.) – United States deputy secretary of Veterans Affairs, 2013–2017
- Jo Handelsman (B.S. 1979) – associate director for science at the White House Office of Science and Technology Policy (2014–2017); member of the American Academy of Arts and Sciences (2019)
- Howard Hart – Central Intelligence Agency officer
- John Hillen (MBA) – 15th assistant secretary of state for Political-Military Affairs (2005–2007)
- Edward M. House (undergrad 1877–80, dropped out) – foreign policy advisor for Woodrow Wilson and Franklin Delano Roosevelt
- Florence Kelley (B.A. 1882) – political and social reformer
- Donald Kerr (B.S. 1963) – assistant director of the FBI; former director of Los Alamos National Laboratory
- H. David Kotz (J.D. 1990) – inspector general of the SEC
- Stephen D. Krasner (B.A. 1963) – director of Policy Planning at the U.S. State Department, professor of political science at Stanford University
- Alan Krueger (B.S. 1983) – labor economist and former chief economist for the US Department of Labor; chair of the Council of Economic Advisers, 2011–2013
- Celso Lafer (Ph.D. 1970) – foreign minister (1992–1992, 2001–2002) and commerce minister (1999–1999) of Brazil
- David R. Macdonald (B.S. 1952) – U.S. assistant Sscretary of the Treasury (Enforcement, Operations, and Tariff Affairs) (1974–1976), under secretary of the Navy (1976–1977), deputy U.S. trade representative (1981–1983)
- Debbie Matz (B.S.) – chairman of the National Credit Union Administration (NCUA) (2009–2016)
- Kyle E. McSlarrow – deputy secretary of the U.S. Department of Energy
- Lenora Moragne (Ph.D. 1969) – head of the Division of Nutrition Education and Training at the Food and Nutrition Service of the U.S. Department of Agriculture
- Amy Rosenbaum – White House director of Legislative Affairs, 2016–2017
- Adam Segal – cybersecurity expert; director at the Digital and Cyberspace Policy Program of the Council on Foreign Relations
- Raj Shah (B.A. 2006 government) – principal deputy press secretary at the White House
- Joseph Simons (A.B. 1980 economics and history) – chairman of the Federal Trade Commission (2018–)
- Alex Vindman – foreign affairs specialist serving on the U.S. National Security Council as director for European Affairs
- Andrew C. Weber – assistant secretary of Defense for Nuclear, Chemical & Biological Defense Programs; Obama administration
- Portia Wu – assistant secretary of labor for employment and training (2014–2017); secretary of the Maryland Department of Labor (2023–)

=== State and local government ===
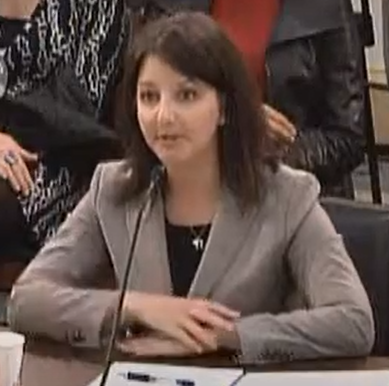
Mandy Cohen

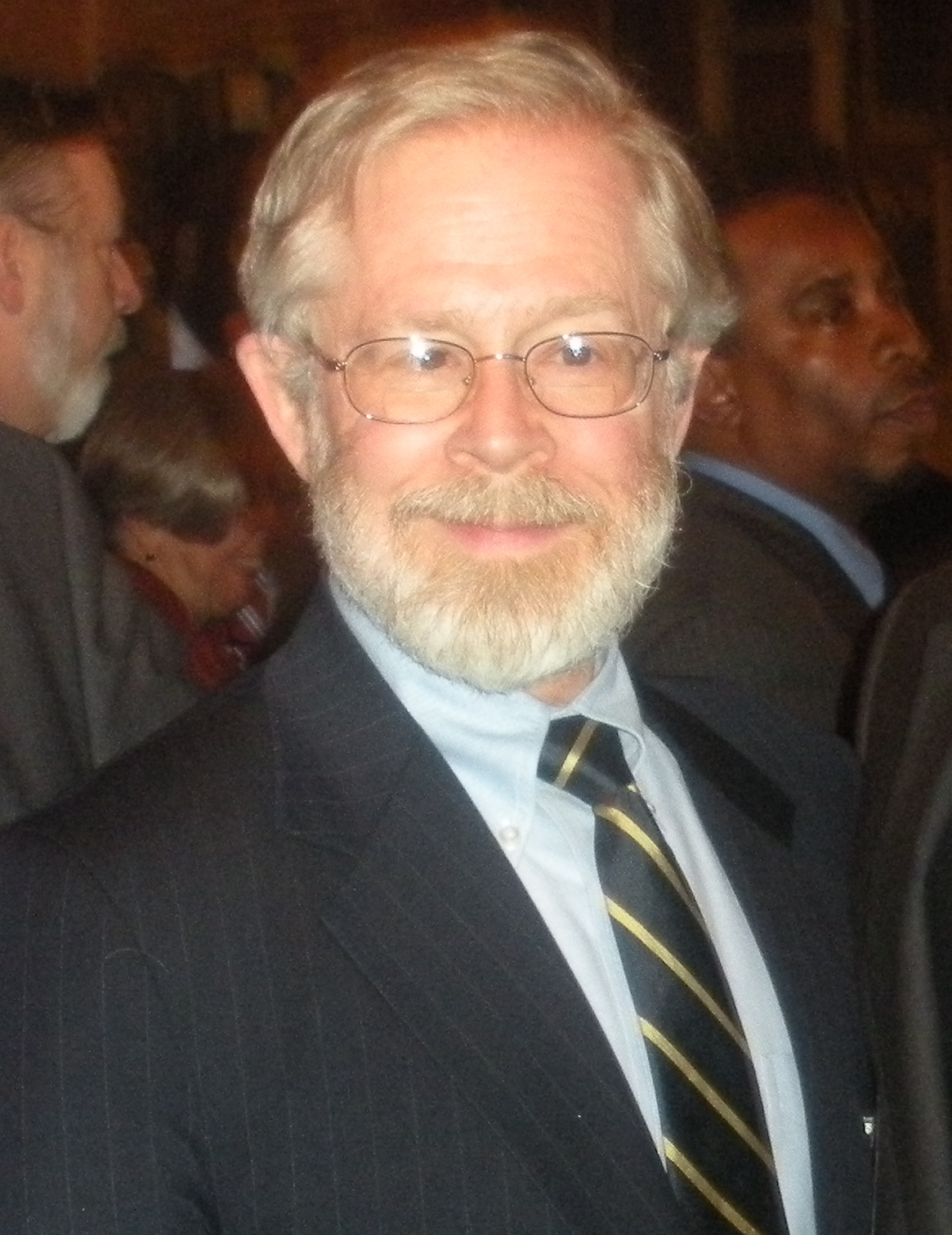
Richard N. Gottfried

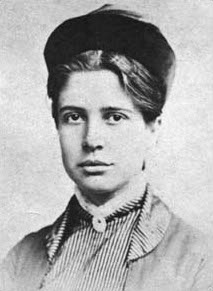
Florence Kelley

- Carol Aichele (B.A.) – secretary of the Commonwealth of Pennsylvania (2011–2015)
- Steve Aichele (B.A. 1970) – former chief of staff to Pennsylvania Governor Tom Corbett
- Nicole Alexander-Scott (B.Sc. 1997) – director of the Rhode Island Department of Health
- Alan A. Altshuler (B.A.) – Massachusetts secretary of transportation (1971–1975); former dean of the Harvard Graduate School of Design and of the Graduate School of Public Administration at New York University; fellow of the American Academy of Arts and Sciences (1997)
- Jane Amero (B.A. 1963) – Maine state senator (1992–2000)
- Irma Anderson (B.S. Nursing) – mayor of Richmond, California (2001–2006)
- Patrice Arent (J.D. 1981) – member of the Utah House of Representatives (1997–2002, 2011–present) and Utah State Senate (2003–2006)
- Byron Baer – member of the New Jersey General Assembly (1972–1993) and New Jersey state senator (1994–2005)
- Roy E. Baldwin (B.S. 1970) – member of Pennsylvania House of Representatives (2002–present)
- Calvin Barton (1899) – mayor of Norwalk, Connecticut (1921–1923)
- Ruth Bascom (Master's in Social Psychology) – first female mayor of Eugene, Oregon (1993–1996)
- Bob Bastian (Veterinary Medicine 1963) – member of the Pennsylvania House of Representatives (1999–2008)
- Elizabeth Bennett-Parker (B.A. 2007, History) – vice mayor of Alexandria, Virginia (2019–2021), delegate in the Virginia House of Delegates (2022–2026), and senator in the Virginia Senate (2026–present)
- George A. Blauvelt (1890) – New York State Assemblyman (1911, 1912) and New York state senator (1913, 1914)
- Alex Bores (B.S. 2013, ILR) – New York State Assemblyman (2023–)
- Peter Bowman (B.S. 1960, Electrical Engineering) – Maine state senator (2006–2010)
- William B. Broydrick – Wisconsin politician
- David Carlucci (B.S. 2002, ILR) – New York state senator (2011–2020)
- Nelson W. Cheney (B.A. 1899) – New York State Assemblyman (1916–1929) and New York state senator (1930–1938)
- Parley Parker Christensen – Utah and California politician, Esperantist
- Clem S. Clarke (two years, Geology) – oilman and Republican politician from Shreveport, Louisiana
- Mandy Cohen (B.S. 2000) – secretary of the North Carolina Department of Health and Human Services, director of the U.S. Centers for Disease Control and Prevention
- Ernest E. Cole (B.S. 1895) – commissioner of Education of the State of New York, 1940–1942
- Edwin L. Crawford – first county executive of Broome County, New York
- Clifford W. Crouch (AAS 1965, dairy science) – New York State Assemblyman
- Charles d'Autremont (1868–1871) – mayor of Duluth, Minnesota
- Melissa DeRosa (B.A.) – executive secretary to Governor Andrew Cuomo
- Samuel B. Dicker (1911) – 58th mayor of Rochester, New York (1939–1955)
- Harriet Drummond (B.S. 1974) – member of the Alaska House of Representatives (2013–present)
- Robert Flanagan (J.D. 1974) – secretary of the Maryland Department of Transportation (2003–2007) and member of the Maryland House of Delegates (1987–2003)
- John Ford – New York state senator (1896–1900)
- Vincent J. Gentile (B.A.) – New York state senator (1997–2002) and New York City Councilman (2003–2017)
- Kim Gillan (Masters 1975) – member of the Montana House of Representatives (1996–2004) and of the Montana state senator (2004–2012)
- Richard N. Gottfried (B.A. 1968) – New York State Assemblyman (1971–2022)
- Geoffrey Gratwick (post-doctoral fellowship) – physician and Maine state senator (2012–)
- Mark Green (B.A. 1967) – government consumer-affairs activist, New York Public Advocate (1994–2001)
- Dennis Hollingsworth (Dairy Science) – member of California State Legislature (2000–2010)
- Clinton T. Horton (B.A. 1898, LL.B. 1899) – New York State Assemblyman (1912–1914), New York state senator (1915–1916), and justice of the New York Supreme Court (1922–1935)
- Alyson Huber (B.S.) – member of the California State Assembly (2008–2012); judge of the Superior Court of Sacramento County in California (2012–)
- Tony Hwang (B.S.) – member of the Connecticut House of Representatives (2009–2015) and Connecticut state senator (2015–)
- Henry W. Jeffers (B.S. 1899) – chairman of the New Jersey Republican State Committee (1935–1937); inventor of the Rotolactor
- Phyllis Kahn (B.A. 1957) – member of the Minnesota House of Representatives for more than 40 years (1973–)
- Gail Laughlin (Law 1898) – lawyer; suffragist; member of the Maine State Senate
- Gail Lavielle (B.A. English) – member of the Connecticut House of Representatives (2011–)
- Harold O. Levy (B.A. 1974, J.D. 1977) – chancellor of New York City Schools 2000–2002
- William Magee (bachelor's degree 1961, agricultural economics) – New York State Assemblyman
- Stanley Makowski (attended with a certificate from ILR) – mayor of the City of Buffalo, New York (1973–1977)
- Dan Meuser – Secretary of Revenue of Pennsylvania (2011–2015)
- Daneek Miller – New York City Councilman (2014–2021)
- Wheeler Milmoe (A.B. 1917) – member of the New York State Assembly 1934–1952 and New York State Senate (1953–1958)
- E. Blackburn Moore – member (1933–1967), speaker (1950–1967) of the Virginia House of Delegates
- Sherman Moreland (B.Litt. 1892, LL.B. 1894) – member of the New York State Assembly (1903–1907) and associate justice of the Supreme Court of the Philippines
- Becky Morgan (B.S. 1960) – California state senator (1984–1993)
- Svante Myrick (A.B. 2009) – mayor of Ithaca, New York (2012–2022); former member of Ithaca Common Council for the 4th Ward
- Zellnor Myrie (J.D. 2016) – New York state senator (2019–)
- Benjamin Nichols (B.S. 1946, M.S. 1949) – mayor of Ithaca, New York (1989–1995)
- Michael F. Nozzolio (Bachelor's ILR, Master's in Public Administration and Agricultural Economics) – New York State Assemblyman (1983–1992) and the New York State Senate (1993–2016)
- William O'Brien (attended 2 years, mechanical engineering) – member of the Minnesota House of Representatives (1963–1967), 11th Minnesota State Auditor (1969–1971)
- Bill O'Neill – member of the New Mexico Legislature (2009–)
- Ralph Perlman – Louisiana state budget director, 1967–1988
- Charles Gilbert Peterson – mayor of Lockport, New York
- Fred B. Pitcher (B.S. 1888) – New York state senator (1919–1922)
- Cuthbert W. Pound (1887 law professor) – New York state senator; chief justice of the New York Court of Appeals
- Samuel Rabin – New York State Assemblyman (1945–1954); New York Supreme Court justice
- Elijah Reichlin-Melnick (B.A. 2006) – New York state senator (2021–2023)
- Joseph D. Scholtz (B.A. 1912) – mayor of Louisville, Kentucky (1937–1941)
- Martha Schrader (B.A.) – Oregon state senator (2009–2011); Clackamas County, Oregon commissioner (2003–2009, 2012–)
- Samuel S. Slater (B.L. and LL.B. 1894) – New York State Assemblyman (1899–1900) and New York state senator (1901–1902)
- Gayle Slossberg (B.S. 1987) – Connecticut state senator (2005–)
- William T. Smith (1938) – New York state senator (1963–1986)
- Ellen Spiegel (B.S. 1984) – member of the Nevada Assembly (2008–)
- Karen Spilka (B.A.) – member of the Massachusetts House of Representatives (2001–2005) and Massachusetts state senator (2005–)
- Thomas J. Surpless (1900) – New York State Assemblyman (1906–1909)
- Gaye Symington (M.B.A. 1983) – member (1996–2009) and speaker (2005–2009) of the Vermont House of Representatives
- Rick Taylor (Master's 1998 ILR) – member of the Pennsylvania House of Representatives (2007–2010)
- James S. Truman (Ph.B. 1896, LL.B. 1898) – New York state senator (1925–1928)
- Alicia Roth Weigel (B.A.) – Human Rights commissioner of Austin, Texas
- Roy P. Wilcox (LL.B. 1897) – Wisconsin politician
- Henry D. Williams – New York State Assemblyman (1918) and New York state senator (1925–1930)
- Mitchell Van Yahres (B.S. 1949) – mayor of Charlottesville, Virginia (1970–1972); member of the Virginia House of Delegates (1981–2005)
- Frank L. Young (B.A. 1888) – New York State Assemblyman (1909–1912); justice of the New York State Supreme Court (1922–1930)

=== Non-U.S. governments ===
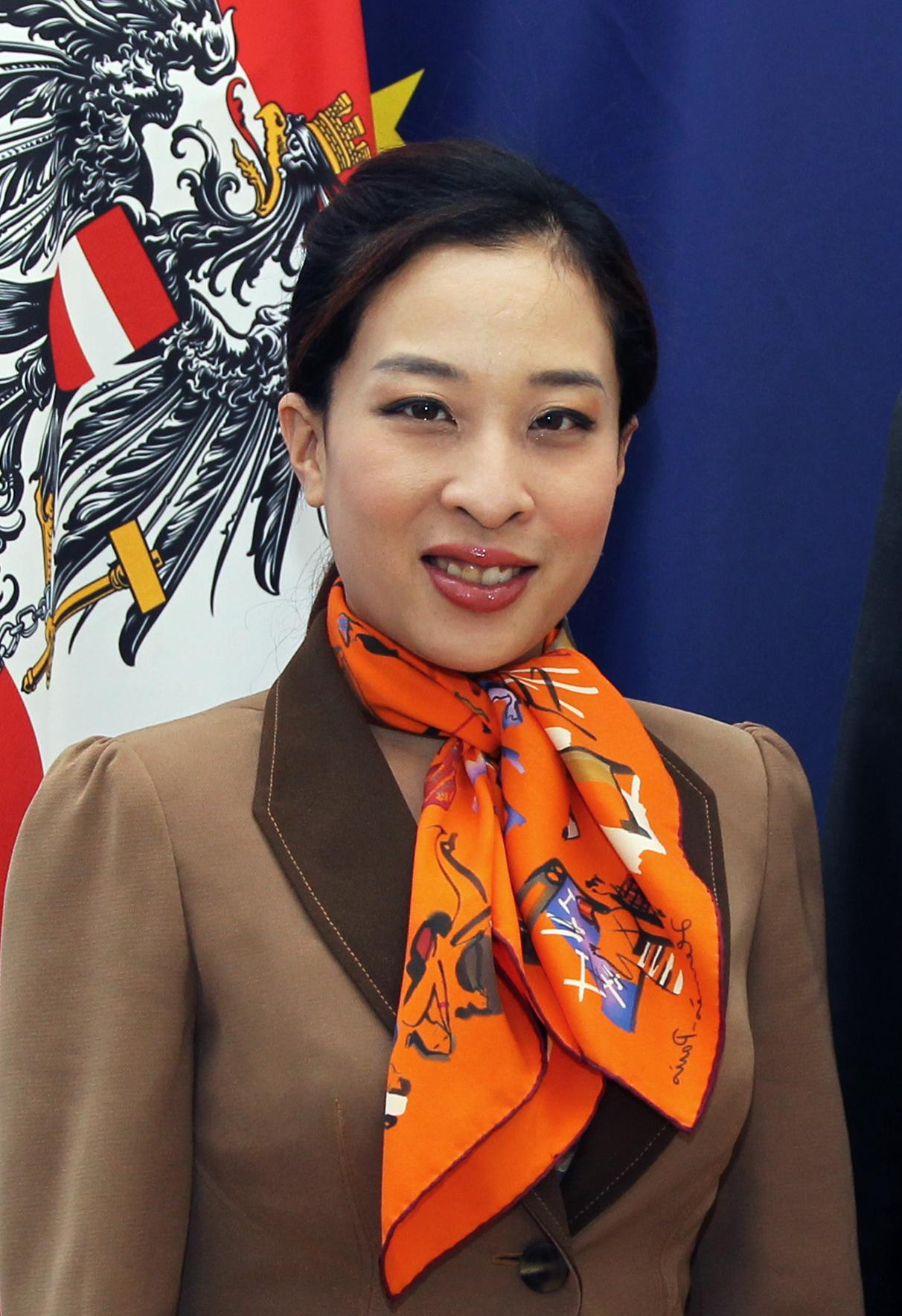
Bajrakitiyabha

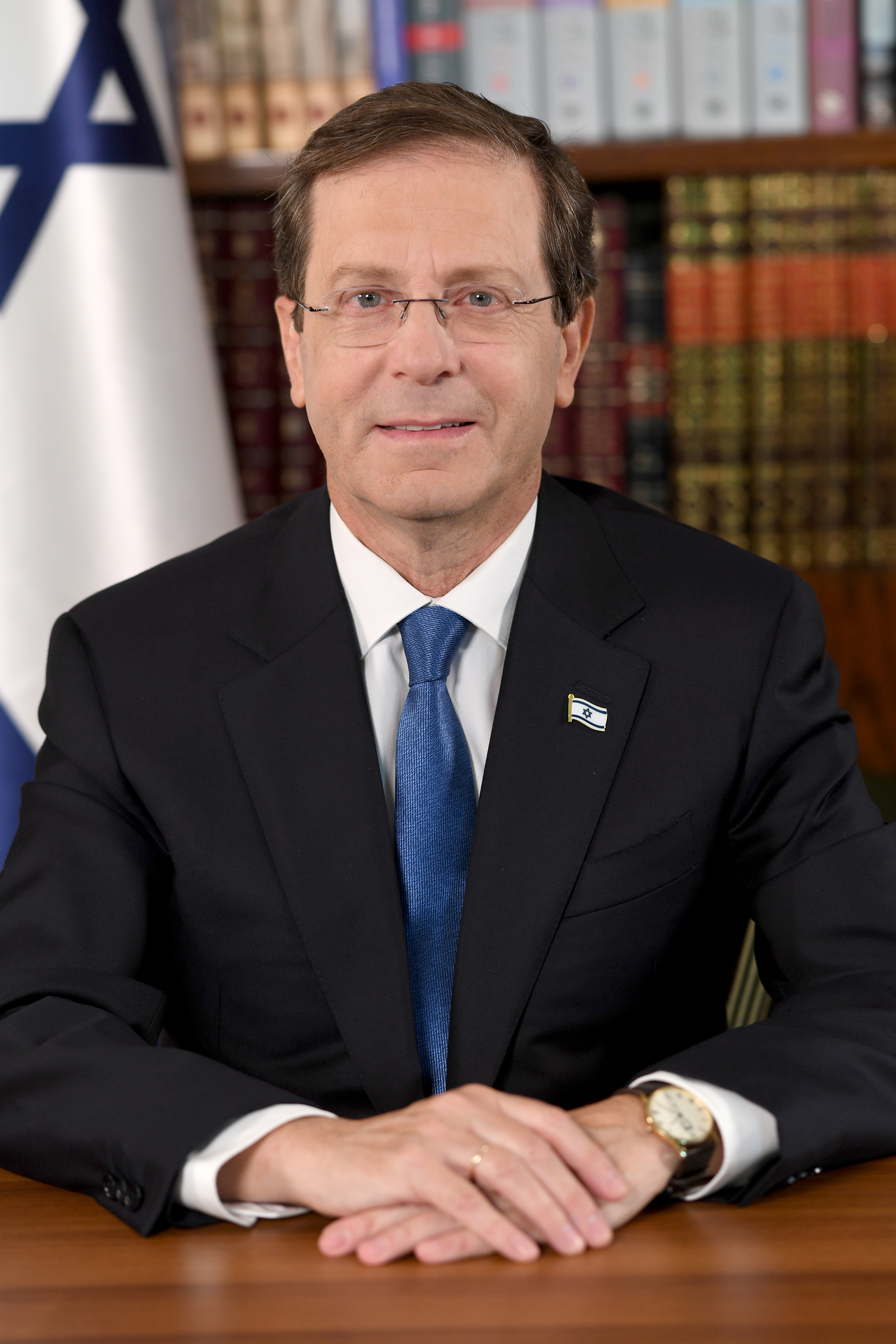
Issac Herzog

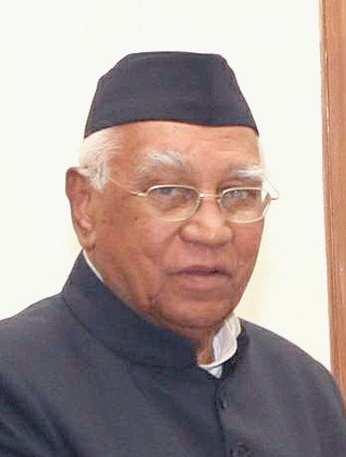
Akhlaqur Rahman Kidwai

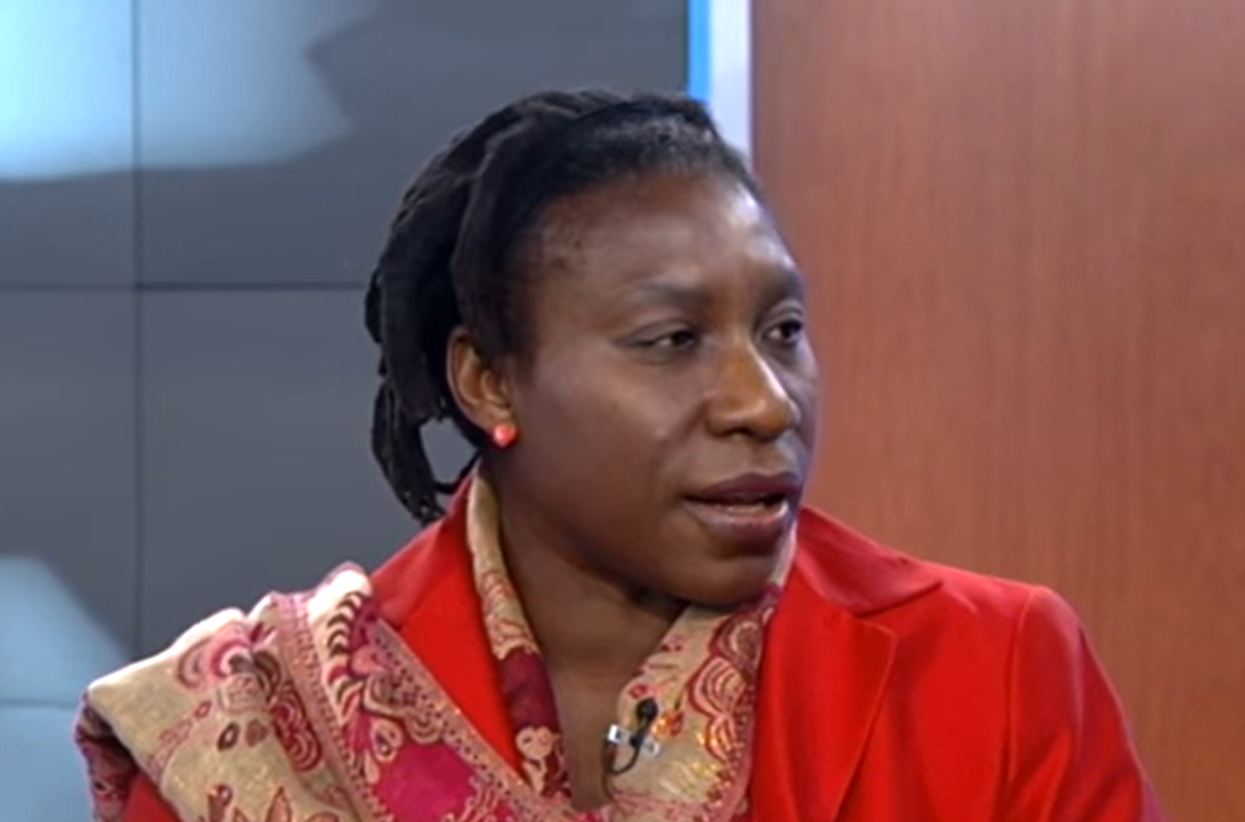
Iyabo Obasanjo

- Bajrakitiyabha (LL.M. 2002, J.S.D. 2005) – princess of Thailand
- Erwin Engst (1941 agro-pastoral studies) – advisor to the People's Republic of China
- María del Rosario Guerra (M.S. Agricultural Economy) – minister of Information Technologies and Communications of the Government of Colombia (2006–2010) and senator of Colombia (2014–)
- Armando Samper Gnecco (B.S. 1943 agricultural economy) – minister of Agriculture of Colombia
- Ricardo Hausmann (Ph.D. 1981) – former Venezuelan Minister and ex-Chairman of the IMF – World Bank Development Committee
- Isaac Herzog – president of Israel
- Akhlaqur Rahman Kidwai (Ph.D. 1950) – governor of Bihar (1979–85, 1993–98), West Bengal (1998–1999), and Haryana (2004–2009), India
- Chih-Kung Lee (M.S. 1985, Ph.D. 1987) – minister of Economic Affairs of the Republic of China (2016–)
- Yatarō Mishima (M.A) – 8th governor of the Bank of Japan (1913–1919)
- Iyabo Obasanjo (Ph.D. 1994) – former Nigerian senator (2007–2011); daughter of former Nigerian President Olusegun Obasanjo
- Napsiah Omar (B.S. Nutrition and Education) – Malaysian educator and politician
- Shih-wei Pan (M.A. Ph.D. ILR) – former minister of Labor of the Republic of China
- Lim Chuan Poh (MBA 1993) – Singaporean civil servant and former army general who served as Chief of the Army (1998–2000) and chief of Defence Force (2000–2003) of the Singapore Armed Forces
- Juan Carlos Esguerra Portocarrero (LL.M. 1973) – minister of National Defence of Colombia (1995–1997) and Justice and Law of Colombia (2011–2012); ambassador of Colombia to the United States (1997–1998)
- Roberto Prats (B.A. 1990 public political analysis and economics) – senator of Puerto Rico
- Charlie Rodríguez (B.A. 1976 in Government and History) – 11th president of the Senate of Puerto Rico (1997–2000)
- Martin Romualdez (B.A. 1985 government) – 28th speaker of the House of Representatives of the Philippines, member of the House of Representatives of the Philippines from Leyte (2007–2016, 2019–present)
- Chang San-cheng (Ph.D. 1981) – Taiwanese politician; premier of the Republic of China February 1, 2016 – May 20, 2016
- José Serra (M.A., Ph.D. Economics) – Brazilian politician who served as a Brazil congressman, senator, minister of Planning and minister of Health, mayor of São Paulo and governor of São Paulo state
- Robert Sopuck (M.S. 1975) – member of Canadian Parliament (2010–)
- Huang Ta-chou (Ph.D. 1971 agriculture) – mayor of Taipei (1990–1994)
- Mamintal A.J. Tamano (LL.M. 1958) – Filipino statesman; former Senator of the Philippines
- Martín Travieso (Law 1903) – member of the Puerto Rico Senate (1917–1921), mayor of San Juan, Puerto Rico (1921–1923), 4th chief justice of the Supreme Court of Puerto Rico (1944–1948)
- Ting-kuei Tsay (Ph.D. 1982) – vice-chairman of Taiwan's Environmental Protection Administration, 2002–2004
- Chang San-cheng (Ph.D. 1981) – president of the Executive Yuan of the Republic of China (2016)
- Wu Tsung-tsong (M.S. 1983, Ph.D. 1987) – minister without portfolio, Executive Yuan, Republic of China (2016–)
- William Wallace, Baron Wallace of Saltaire (Ph.D.) – scholar and Liberal Democrat peer

== Journalism and media ==
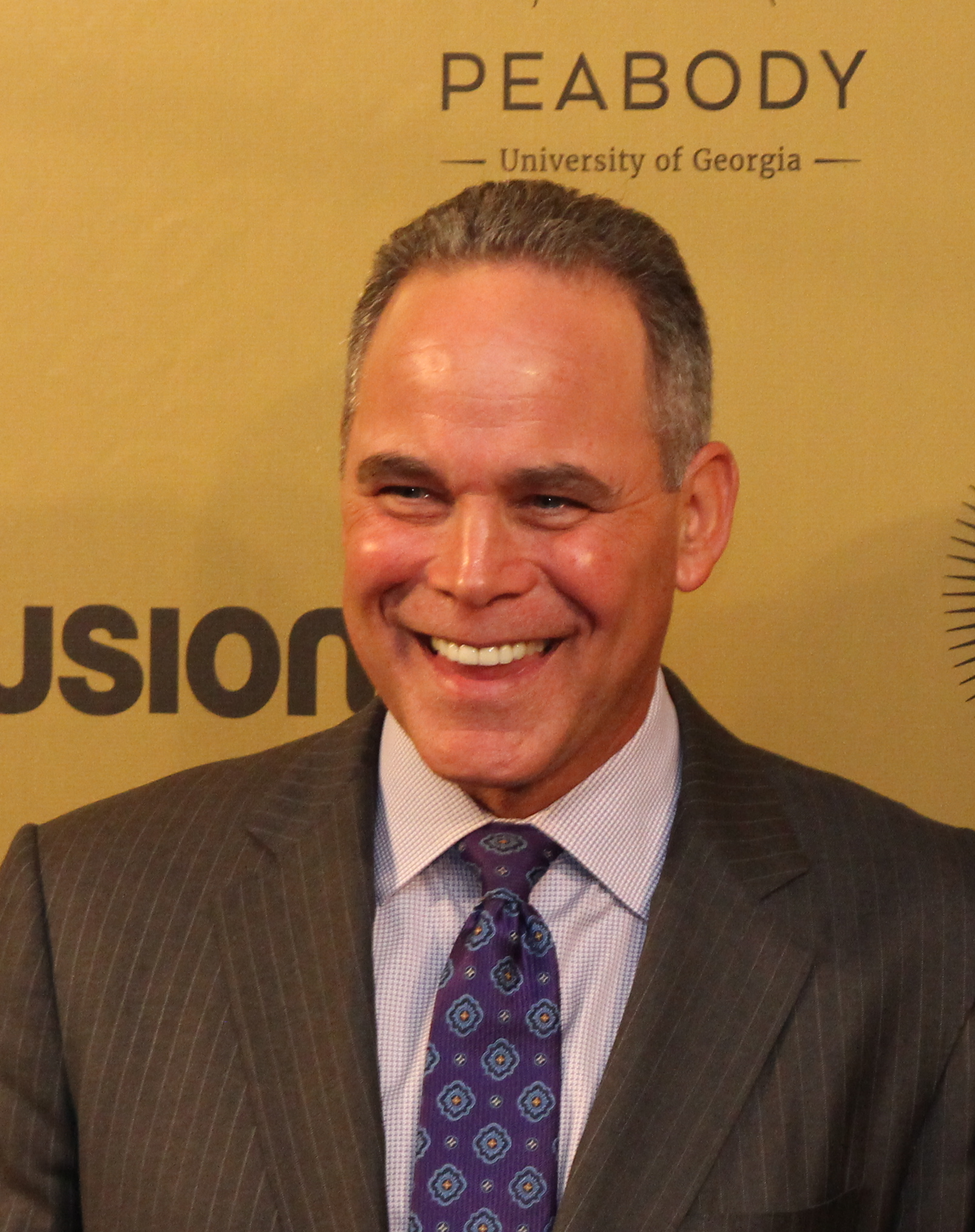
Jim Axelrod

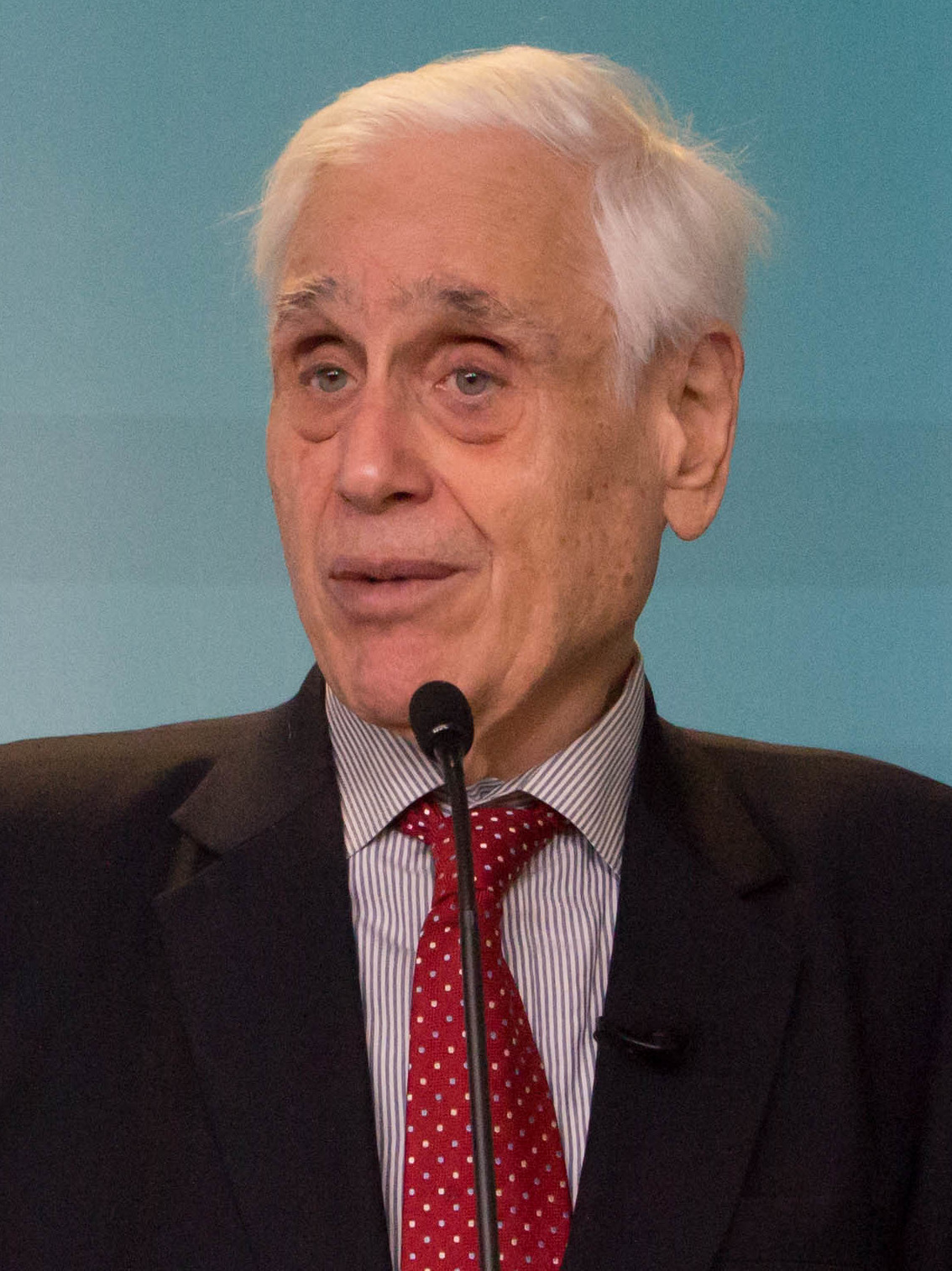
Edward Jay Epstein

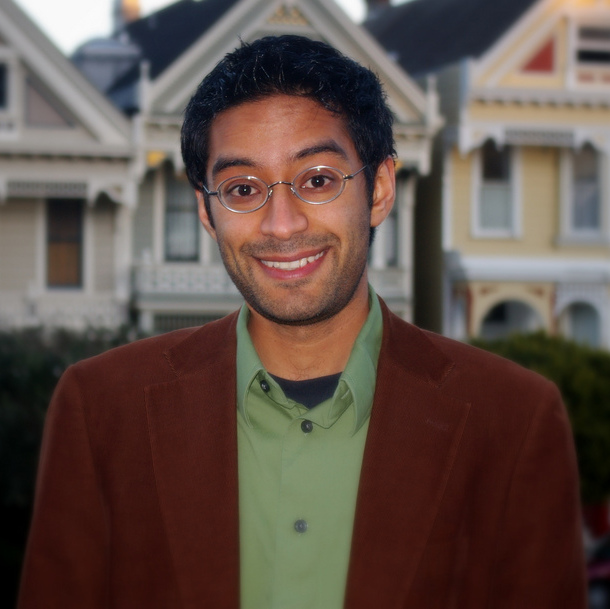
Farhad Manjoo

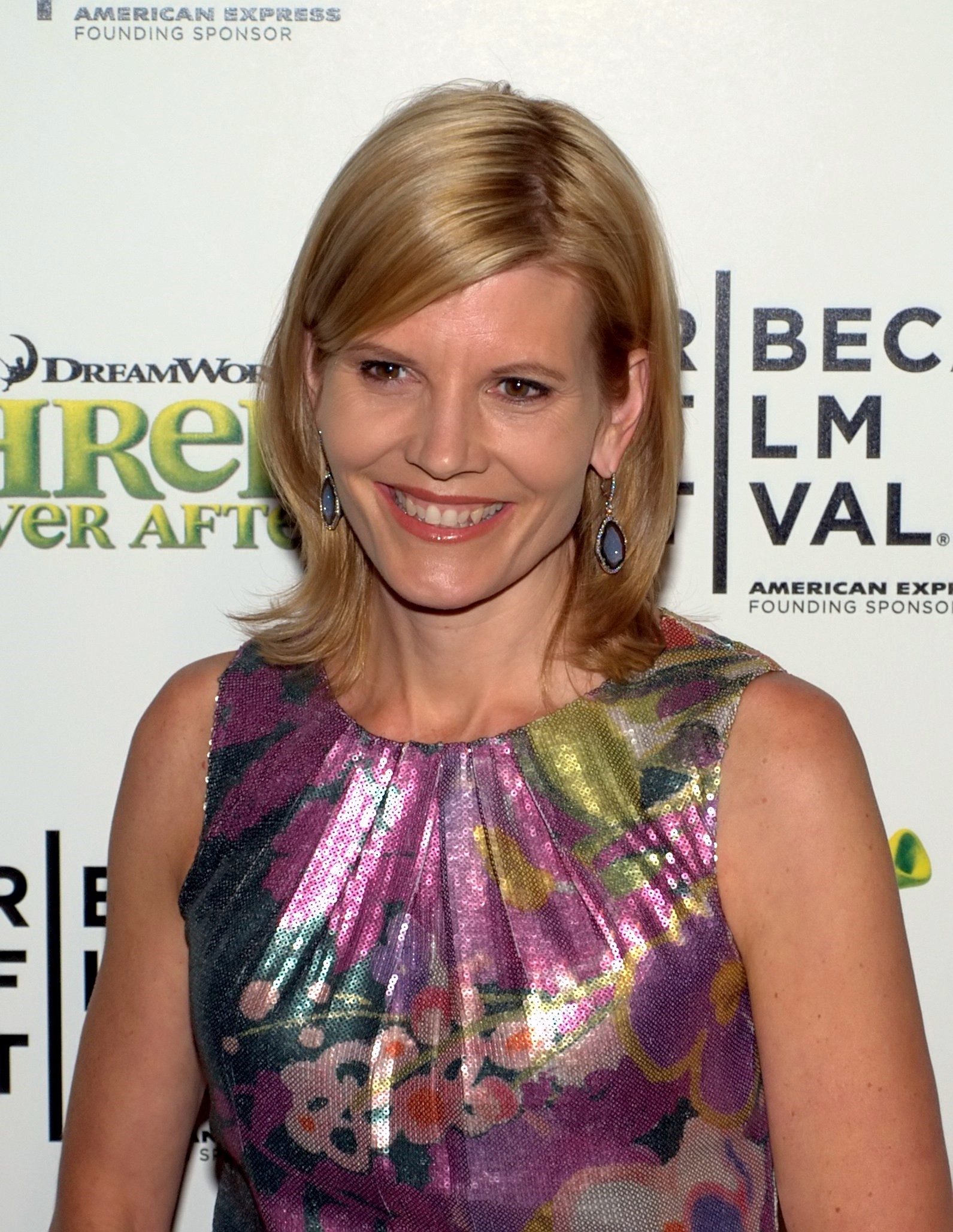
Kate Snow

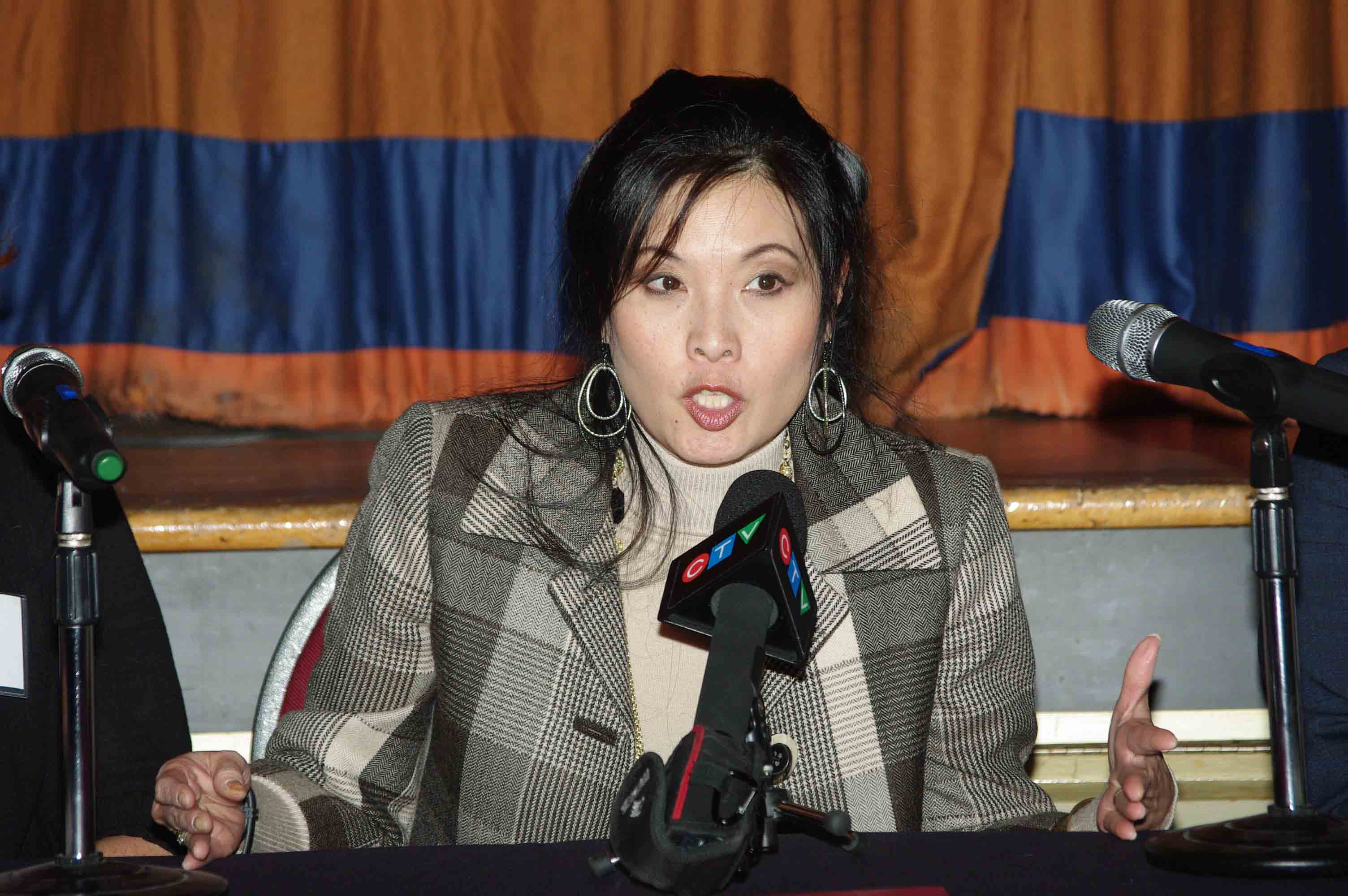
Sheryl WuDunn

- Eric Alterman (B.A. 1982 history and government) – author and columnist
- Jim Axelrod (B.A. 1985 history) – national correspondent and reporter for CBS News
- Ken Blum – editor, 48 Hours
- Jane Brody (1962, Biochemistry) – The New York Times health and nutrition journalist
- Rodney A. Brooks (B.S. 1975 – personal finance editor with USA Today
- Marion Hamilton Carter (B.S. 1898) – educator, psychologist, journalist, and author
- Julius Chambers (B.A. 1870) – author, editor, journalist, and travel writer
- C.J. Chivers (B.A. 1987) – foreign correspondent with The New York Times; winner of Pulitzer Prize for International Reporting as part of a team of The New York Times reporters and photographers (2009) and winner of Pulitzer Prize for Feature Writing (2017)
- Charles Collingwood (B.A. 1939) – broadcast journalist and foreign correspondent
- S.E. Cupp (B.A. 2000 art history) – co-host of MSNBC's The Cycle
- Michael Dirda (M.A. 1974, Ph.D. 1977, comparative literature) – Pulitzer Prize-winning book critic for The Washington Post
- Dean Edell (B.A, M.D. 1967) - hosted KGO radio's "The Dr. Dean Edell" radio program from 1979 until December 10, 2010.
- Edward Jay Epstein (B.A., M.A.) – investigative journalist and former political science professor, Harvard University, UCLA, and MIT
- Jessica Ettinger (B.S. 1997) – news anchor with CBS 1010 WINS New York; anchor of Today Show Radio, SiriusXM/NBC
- David Folkenflik (B.A. 1991 arts and sciences) – media correspondent for NPR
- Michael Fremer (B.S. 1968 Industrial and Labor Relations) – audiophile journalist
- Jeffrey Gettleman (B.A. 1994) – foreign correspondent, The New York Times; Pulitzer Prize for International Reporting (2012)
- Iser Ginzburg (MD 1900) – physician and Yiddish journalist
- Wendy M. Grossman (B.A. 1975) – journalist and blogger
- Philip Gourevitch (B.A. 1986) – former editor of The Paris Review; 1998 National Book Critics Circle Award winner
- Carolyn Gusoff (B.A. 1984) – reporter and anchor with WNBC in New York City
- Sally Jacobsen (M.A. Economics) – journalist and foreign correspondent; first woman to serve as international editor of the Associated Press
- Andy Kessler (B.S. 1980) – "Inside View" columnist, Wall Street Journal opinion page; author
- Neeraj Khemlani (1992) – co-president of CBS News
- Aditi Kinkhabwala (B.A. American Studies) – sports reporter for NFL Network
- Austin H. Kiplinger (B.A. 1939) – journalist; editor of The Kiplinger Letter; founder of Kiplinger's Personal Finance magazine; winner of the Peabody Award
- John S. Knight – major newspaper publisher and editor, Pulitzer Prize winner
- Steven Lagerfeld (B.A. 1977) – editor of The Wilson Quarterly
- Carl Leubsdorf (B.A. 1959 government) – journalist and columnist
- Eric Lichtblau (B.A. 1987 English and political science) – Pulitzer Prize-winning journalist for national reporting with The New York Times
- Roger Lowenstein (B.A. 1973) – financial journalist and author of When Genius Failed (2000)
- Stuart Loory (B.A. 1954) – executive and reporter, CNN
- Farhad Manjoo (2000) – journalist and author, columnist for The Wall Street Journal, The New York Times
- James C. McKinley Jr. (B.A. 1984) – foreign correspondent, The New York Times
- Anne Morrissy Merick (1955) – journalist who broke barriers against women
- Philip Merrill (B.A. 1955 government, trustee) – owner and publisher of The Capital Daily Newspaper in Annapolis, MD and Washingtonian magazine; international statesman; adviser to U.S. presidents
- Jeremy O'Grady (M.A. Political Science) – founding editor of The Week news digest magazine, and one of its original owners; now its editor-in-chief
- Keith Olbermann (B.S. 1979 communication arts) – sports commentator, MSNBC news anchor, co-host of Football Night in America of NBC
- Jon Ralston (B.A. 1981) – journalist, founder of The Nevada Independent
- John Andrew Rea (B.A. 1869) – editor of The Olympian, Minneapolis Tribune, Bismarck Tribune and the Dakota edition of the St. Paul Pioneer Press
- Jeremy Schaap (1991) – author, sports journalist, recipient of eight Emmy Awards
- Vivian Schiller (B.A. Russian) – former CEO of NPR
- Kate Snow (B.S. 1991 communication) – journalist, correspondent, NBC News
- Andrew Ross Sorkin (B.S. 1999 communication) – journalist, co-anchor of Squawk Box, author of Too Big to Fail
- Sarah Spain – ESPN sports journalist
- Gerald Stone (1957 political science) – Australian television and radio journalist, television executive, and author
- Howard Taubman (B.A. 1929) – chief music critic and chief theater critic for The New York Times in the 1950s and 1960s
- William T. Vollmann (B.A. 1981 comparative literature) – journalist, author of numerous books on war, including a seven-volume treatise on violence
- Whit Watson (B.A., English, 1993) – announcer on Golf Channel, formerly at ESPN and Sun Sports; winner of four Emmy Awards; former sports director at WVBR
- Robin Wolaner (B.S. 1975 industrial and labor relations) – founder of Parenting Magazine
- Sheryl WuDunn (B.A. 1981 European history) – journalist at The New York Times, co-winner in 1990 of the Pulitzer Prize for her coverage on the Tienanmen Square protests of 1989, winner of the George Polk Award in 1989, and winner of the Overseas Press Club in 1990
- Robert Zelnick (B.S.) – journalist, winner of two Emmy Awards and two Gavel Awards, former ABC News correspondent for more than 20 years, and professor of journalism at Boston University College of Communication

== Law ==
=== Supreme Court justices ===
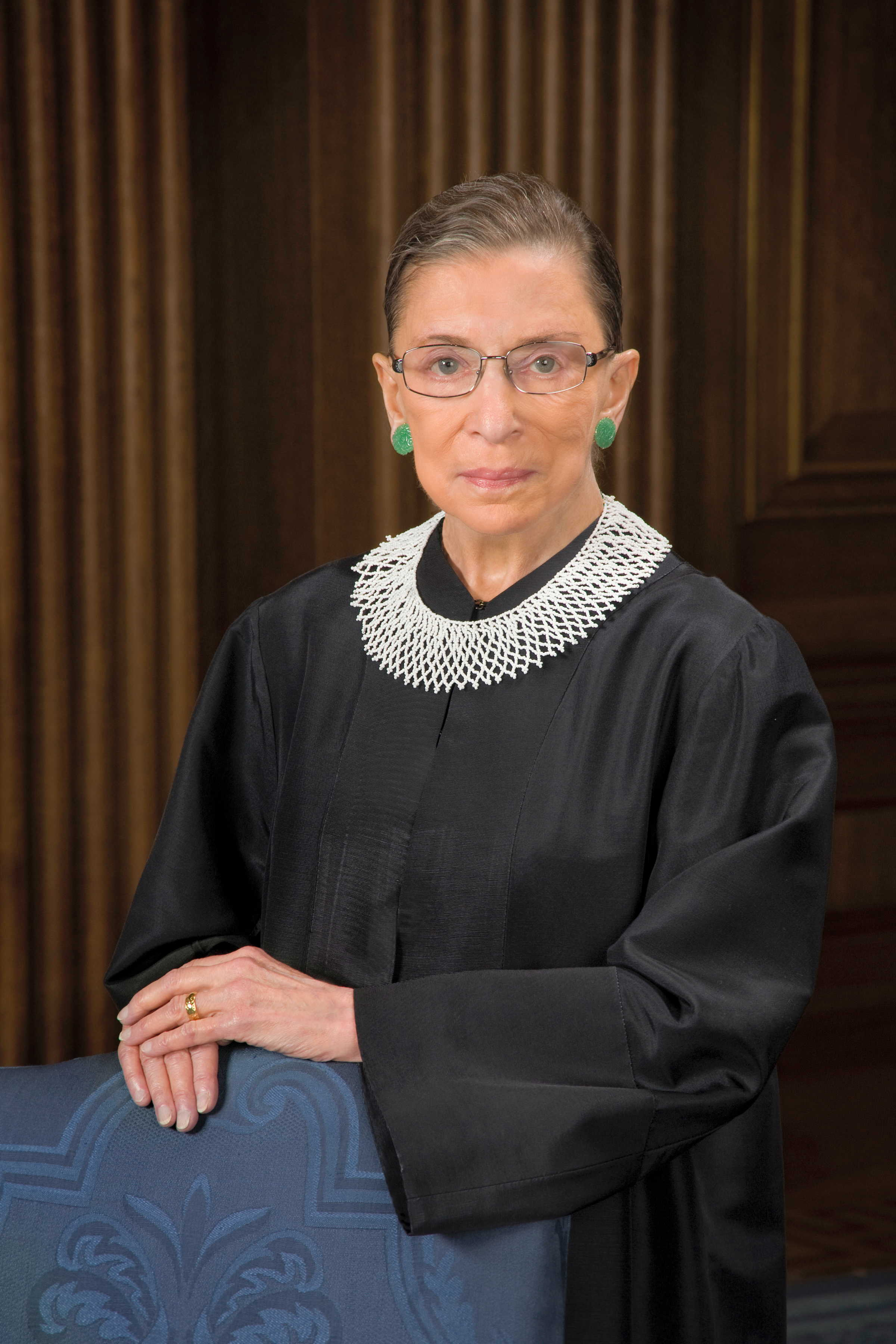
Ruth Bader Ginsburg

- Ruth Bader Ginsburg (B.A. 1954 government) – U.S. Supreme Court associate justice 1993–2020
- Sherman Moreland (LL.B. 1894) – associate justice of the Supreme Court of the Philippines
- Leonardo Quisumbing (LL.M.) – associate justice of the Supreme Court of the Philippines

=== Federal judges ===
Ronnie Abrams

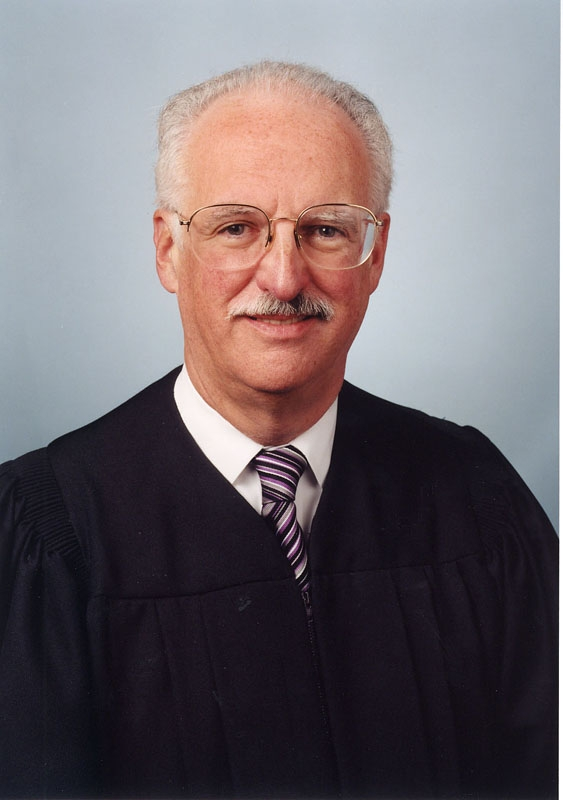
Douglas H. Ginsburg

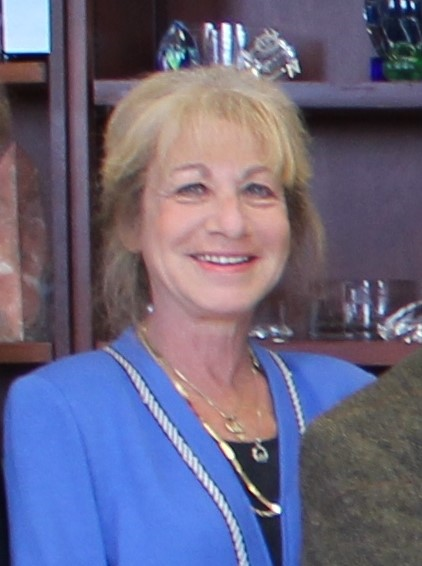
Sharon Prost

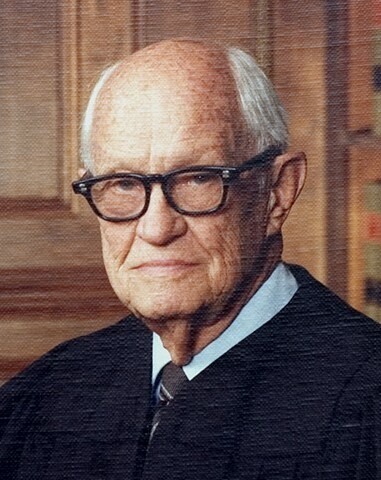
Elbert Tuttle

- Ronnie Abrams (B.A. 1990) – federal judge of the United States District Court for the Southern District of New York (2012–)
- Simon L. Adler (LL.B. 1889) – United States district judge of the United States District Court for the Western District of New York
- Mark J. Bennett (J.D. 1979) – judge of the U.S. Court of Appeals for the Ninth Circuit and Attorney General of Hawaii
- Richard M. Berman (B.S. 1964) – senior judge of the United States District Court for the Southern District of New York
- Frederic Block (LL.B. 1959) – senior judge of the United States District Court for the Eastern District of New York
- Robert Boochever (B.A. 1939, J.D. 1941) – senior judge of the United States Court of Appeals for the Ninth Circuit; chief justice of the Alaska Supreme Court
- Leonie Brinkema (J.D. 1976) – U.S. district court judge
- Brian Cogan (J.D. 1979) – federal judge of the United States District Court for the Eastern District of New York
- Christopher C. Conner (B.A. 1979) – federal judge of the United States District Court for the Middle District of Pennsylvania
- Paul A. Crotty (LL.B. 1967) – federal judge, Southern District of New York
- Mary H. Donlon (LL.B. 1920) – U.S. Customs Court judge; first female editor-in-chief of the Cornell Law Quarterly and of a U.S. law review
- Henry White Edgerton (A.B. 1910) – justice of the United States Court of Appeals for the D.C. Circuit
- Nancy Garlock Edmunds (B.A. 1969) – judge of the United States District Court for the Eastern District of Michigan
- Harry T. Edwards (B.A. 1962 industrial & labor relations) – chief judge of the United States Court of Appeals for the D.C. Circuit in Washington, D.C.; professor at New York University School of Law; former professor at Duke, Georgetown, Harvard, Pennsylvania, and Michigan law schools; author
- John T. Elfvin (B.E.E. 1942 electrical engineering) – federal judge of the U.S. District Court for the Western District of New York
- Thomas E. Fairchild (B.A. 1934) – senior justice (1981–2007) of the United States Court of Appeals for the Seventh Circuit
- Phillip S. Figa (J.D. 1976) – federal judge of the United States District Court for the District of Colorado
- Paul L. Friedman (B.A. 1965) – senior judge of the United States District Court for the District of Columbia
- Nina Gershon (B.A. 1962 English) – United States magistrate judge of the United States District Court for the Southern District of New York; senior judge of the United States District Court for the Eastern District of New York
- Douglas H. Ginsburg (B.S. 1970) – chief judge of the United States Court of Appeals for the District of Columbia Circuit
- Peter W. Hall (J.D. 1977) – justice of the United States Court of Appeals for the Second Circuit
- Emily C. Hewitt (A.B. 1966) – chief judge of the United States Court of Federal Claims
- David N. Hurd (B.S. 1959) – judge of the U.S. District Court, Northern District of New York
- Edith Jones (B.A. 1971 economics) – justice of the Fifth Circuit Court of Appeals
- Barbara Milano Keenan (B.A. 1971) – justice of the United States Court of Appeals for the Fourth Circuit; justice of the Supreme Court of Virginia; justice of the Virginia Court of Appeals
- Gladys Kessler (B.A. 1959) – senior judge for the United States District Court for the District of Columbia
- Frederick Bernard Lacey (LL.B. 1948) – judge of the U.S. District Court for the District of New Jersey
- Kenneth K. Lee (B.A. 1997) – justice of the U.S. Court of Appeals for the Ninth Circuit
- Lloyd Francis MacMahon (B.A. 1936, LL.B. 1938) – federal judge of the United States District Court for the Southern District of New York
- Alison J. Nathan (B.A. 1994, J.D. 2000) – judge for the United States District Court for the Southern District of New York
- Edward Nottingham (B.A. 1969) – United States federal judge in the United States District Court for the District of Colorado
- Walter Chadwick Noyes (1888) – United States Court of Appeals for the Second Circuit judge
- Marsha J. Pechman (B.A. 1973) – federal judge (1999–2011), chief federal judge (2011–) of the United States District Court for the Western District of Washington
- Pamela Pepper (J.D. 1989) – judge of the United States District Court for the Eastern District of Wisconsin (2014–)
- Sharon Prost – chief justice of the United States Court of Appeals for the Federal Circuit
- Aubrey Eugene Robinson Jr. (B.A. 1943, LL.B. 1947) – senior judge of the United States District Court for the District of Columbia
- Robin S. Rosenbaum (B.A. 1988) – United States District Court for the Southern District of Florida judge
- Max Rosenn (B.A. 1929) – U.S. Court of Appeals for the Third Circuit judge
- Barbara Jacobs Rothstein (B.A. 1960) – chief judge of the United States District Court for the Western District of Washington; senior judge of the United States District Court for the District of Columbia
- Amy J. St. Eve (B.S. 1987, J.D. 1990) – federal justice of the United States Court of Appeals for the Seventh Circuit
- Karen Gren Scholer (J.D. 1982) – district judge, United States District Court for the Northern District of Texas
- Frederic Palen Schoonmaker (B.A. 1891) – judge for the United States District Court for the Western District of Pennsylvania
- Jonathan R. Steinberg (B.A. 1960) – justice of the United States Court of Appeals for Veterans Claims
- Harold Montelle Stephens (A.B. 1909) – chief justice of the United States Court of Appeals for the D.C. Circuit
- Joseph L. Tauro (LL.B. 1956) – federal judge for the United States District Court for the District of Massachusetts
- Elbert Tuttle (B.A. 1918, LL.B. 1923) – chief justice, U.S. Court of Appeals; ruled on many fundamental 1954 civil-rights cases
- Richard C. Wesley (J.D. 1974) – justice of the United States Court of Appeals for the Second Circuit

=== State and local judges ===
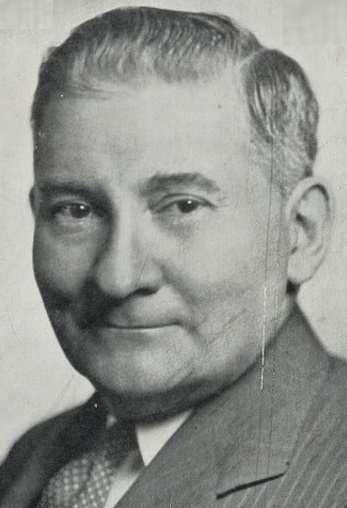
William F. Bleakley

- Barry T. Albin (J.D. 1976) – associate justice of the New Jersey Supreme Court
- William F. Bleakley (LL.B. 1904) – New York Supreme Court justice, first Westchester County Executive
- Leonard C. Crouch (Ph.B. 1889) – New York Supreme Court judge; New York Court of Appeals justice
- William H. Cuddeback (B.A. 1874) – New York Court of Appeals judge
- Dana Fabe (B.A. 1973) – chief justice of the Alaska Supreme Court
- Peter T. Farrell (B.A. 1922) – Queens County Court judge; presided over the trial of bank robber Willie Sutton
- Charles Garside (LL.B. 1923) – New York City municipal judge, notable in New York State Government legal affairs
- Frank H. Hiscock (A.B. 1875) – chief justice of the New York Court of Appeals; and decided the Chester Gillette murder case
- John A. Kronstadt (B.A. 1973) – justice of the Los Angeles County Superior Court; judge of the United States District Court for the Central District of California
- Louis W. Marcus (LL.B. 1889) – justice of the New York Supreme Court
- Andrew J. McDonald (B.A.) – associate justice of the Connecticut Supreme Court; member of the Connecticut Senate
- Edward R. O'Malley (LL.B. 1891) – justice of the New York Supreme Court and former New York Attorney General
- Anne M. Patterson (J.D. 1983) – associate justice of the New Jersey Supreme Court
- Leah Ward Sears (B.S. 1976) – chief justice of the Supreme Court of Georgia
- Miriam Shearing (B.A. Philosophy) – Justice of the Supreme Court of Nevada (1993–2005)
- Lyman H. Smith (B.A. and LL.B.) – justice of the New York Supreme Court
- Harry Taylor (1893) – associate justice of the New York Supreme Court, Appellate Division, Fourth Department (1924–1936); provided the legal advice that elevated the American League to major league status as a rival to the National League

=== Other judges ===
- Sang-Hyun Song (J.S.D. 1970) – judge (2003–2015) and president (2009–2015) of the International Criminal Court

=== Lawyers ===
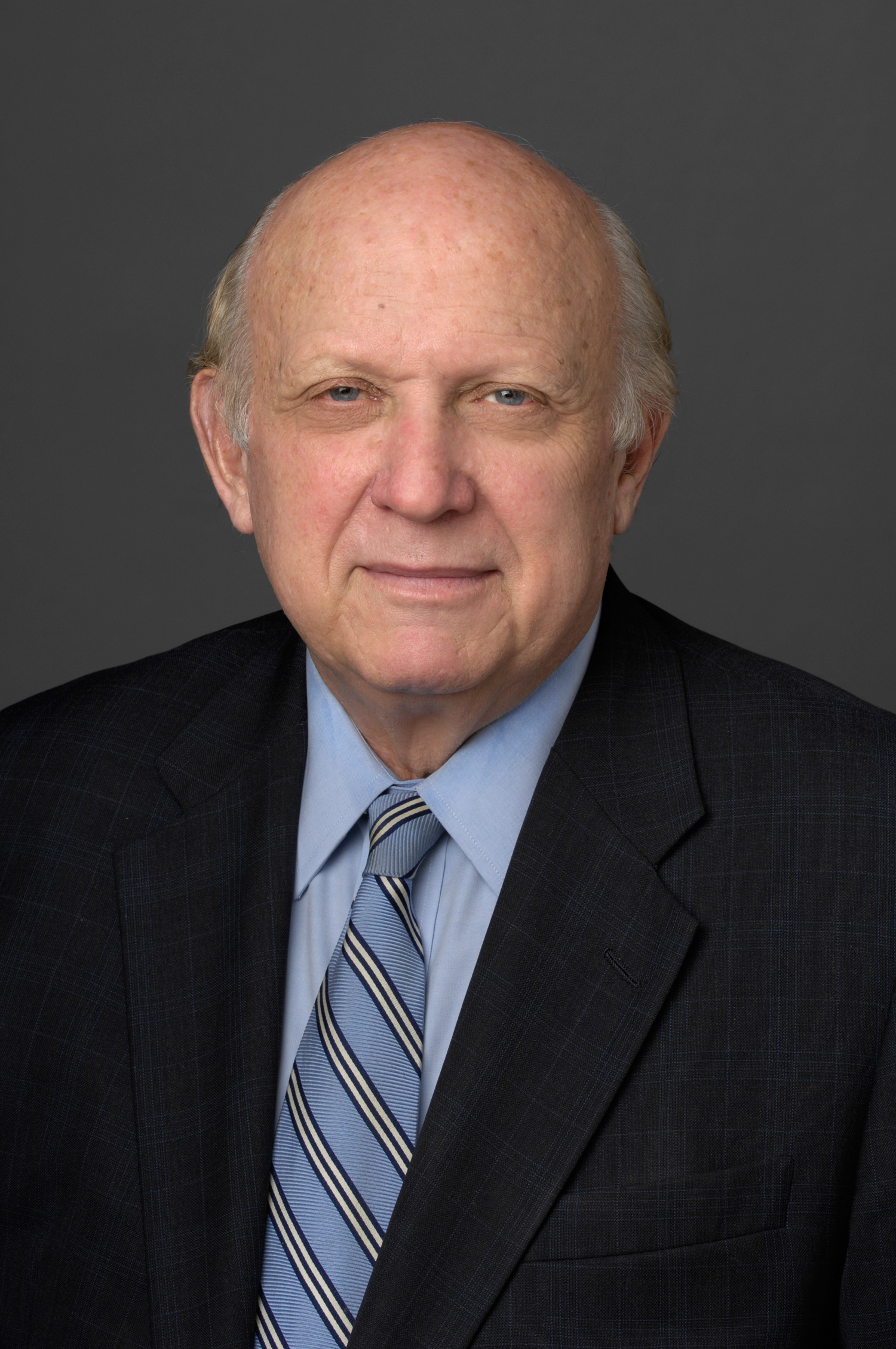
Floyd Abrams

- Floyd Abrams (B.A. 1956) – co-counsel, Pentagon Papers case
- David Buckel (J.D. 1987) – LGBT rights lawyer and environmentalist
- Zachary W. Carter (B.A. 1972), U.S. attorney for the Eastern District of New York
- George B. Clementson (LL.B. 1892) – author of The Road Rights and Liabilities of Wheelmen, the first treatise on bicycle law
- Vijaya Gadde (B.S. in Industrial and Labor Relations) – general counsel of Twitter
- Michael Goldsmith (B.S. 1972, J.D. 1975) – RICO expert; ALS advocate
- William E. Grauer (B.A. 1971, J.D. 1974) – chair of the Standing Committee on Discipline for the United States District Court for the Southern District of California; chair of the Ethics Committee of the San Diego County Bar Association; partner at Cooley LLP
- Theodore W. Kheel (B.A. 1935, law 1937) – attorney; labor mediator
- Leonard Leo (B.A. 1986, J.D. 1989) – executive vice-president of the Federalist Society
- L. Londell McMillan (B.S. 1987 ILR) – entertainment attorney; publisher
- Paul C. Ney Jr. (B.S. 1980 biology) – general counsel of the Department of Defense
- Philip Perry (J.D. 1990) – general counsel for the Department of Homeland Security

== Military ==
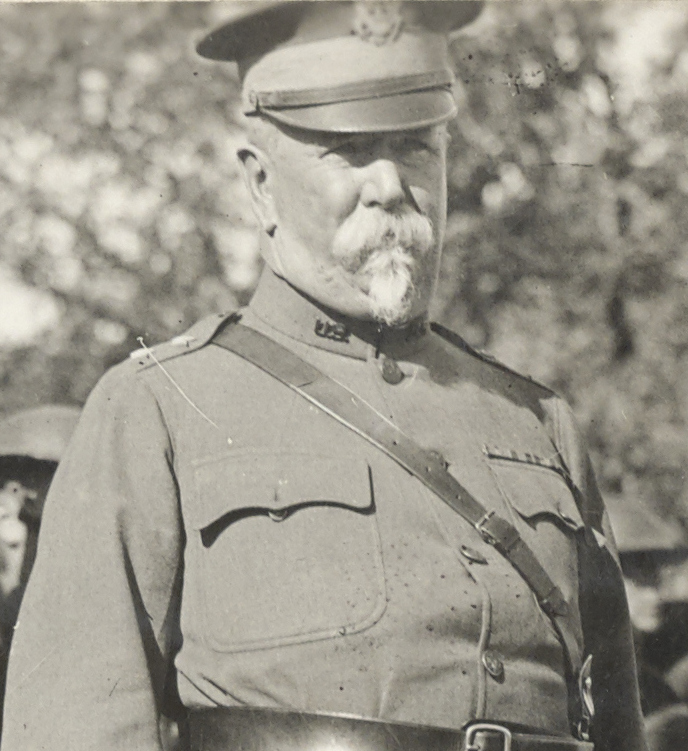
George Bell Jr.

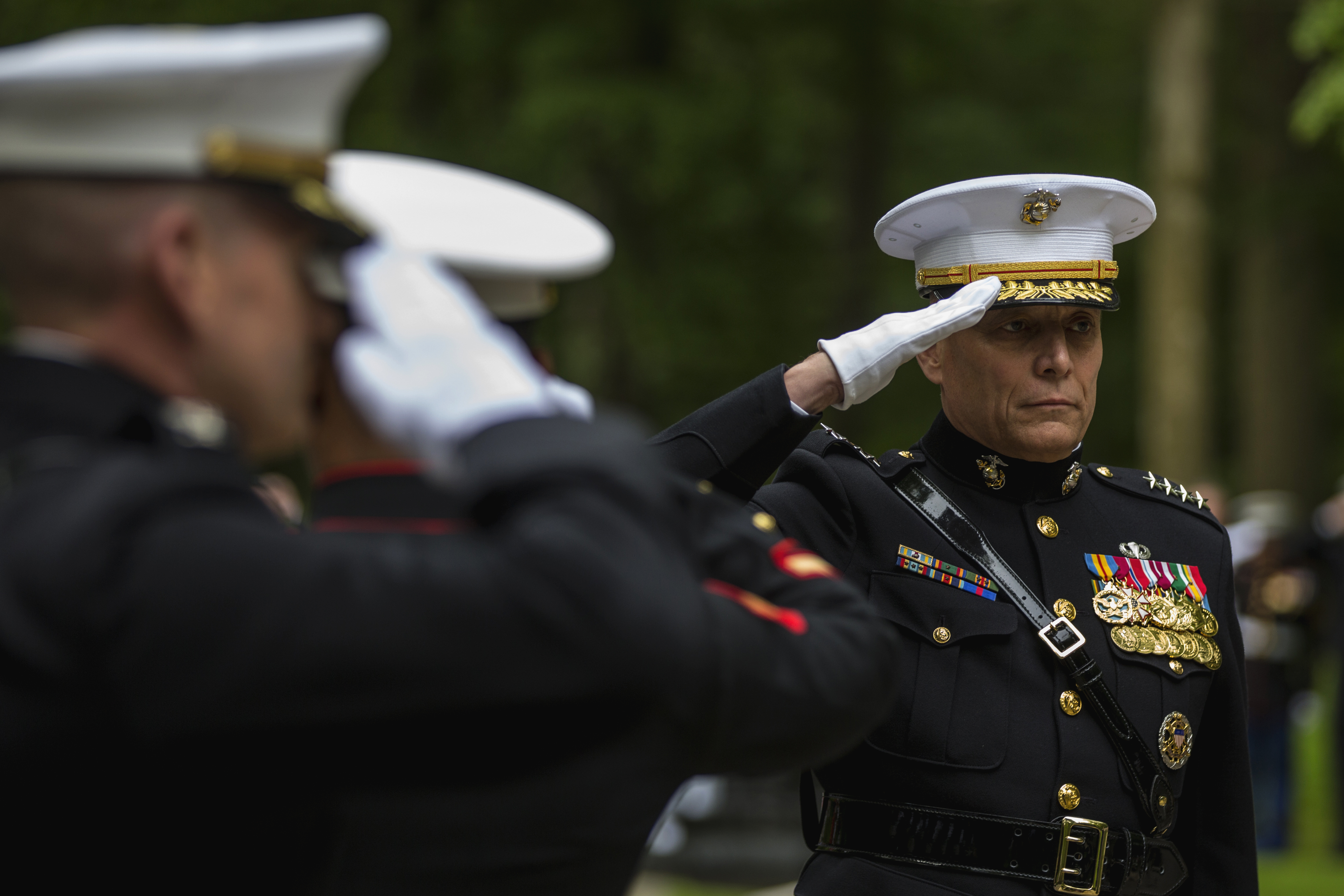
John M. Paxton Jr.

- George Bell Jr. (LL.B., 1894) – United States Army major general who commanded the 33rd Infantry Division during World War I and later the United States VI Corps
- Bruce C. Clarke – United States Army general
- John P. Craven (B.S. 1947) – United States Navy officer, scientist and submarine expert
- Alan Louis Eggers – United States Army sergeant, World War I; awarded for heroic actions near Le Catelet, France
- Rhonda Cornum (Ph.D. 1980 biochemistry and nutrition) – former United States Army Brigadier general; former prisoner of war
- George William Goddard (1917–1918) – United States Air Force brigadier general and a pioneer in aerial photography
- Michael S. Hall (B.S., 1968) – adjutant general of New York
- Webb Hayes (attended 1873–1875) – United States Army brigadier general, Philippine–American War; awarded for rescue of captives at Vigan Island
- Kenneth Nichols (B.S., M.S. civil engineering) – United States Army Major General and an engineer who worked on the Manhattan Project; member of the National Academy of Engineering (1968)
- John M. Paxton Jr. (B.S. 1973, MEng 1974) – major general, United States Marine Corps, Assistant Commandant of the Marine Corps
- Erik M. Ross (B.A. 1988) – U.S. Navy admiral
- Louis Livingston Seaman (A.B. 1872) – military surgeon who served in the Spanish-American War, Russo-Japanese War, and WWI
- David A. Stafford (B.A. 1917) – brigadier general in the United States Marine Corps
- Matt Urban (Matty L. Urbanowitz, B.A. 1941, history, government) – United States Army (1941–46) lieutenant colonel, World War II; awarded for valorous actions in France and Belgium

== Nobel laureates ==
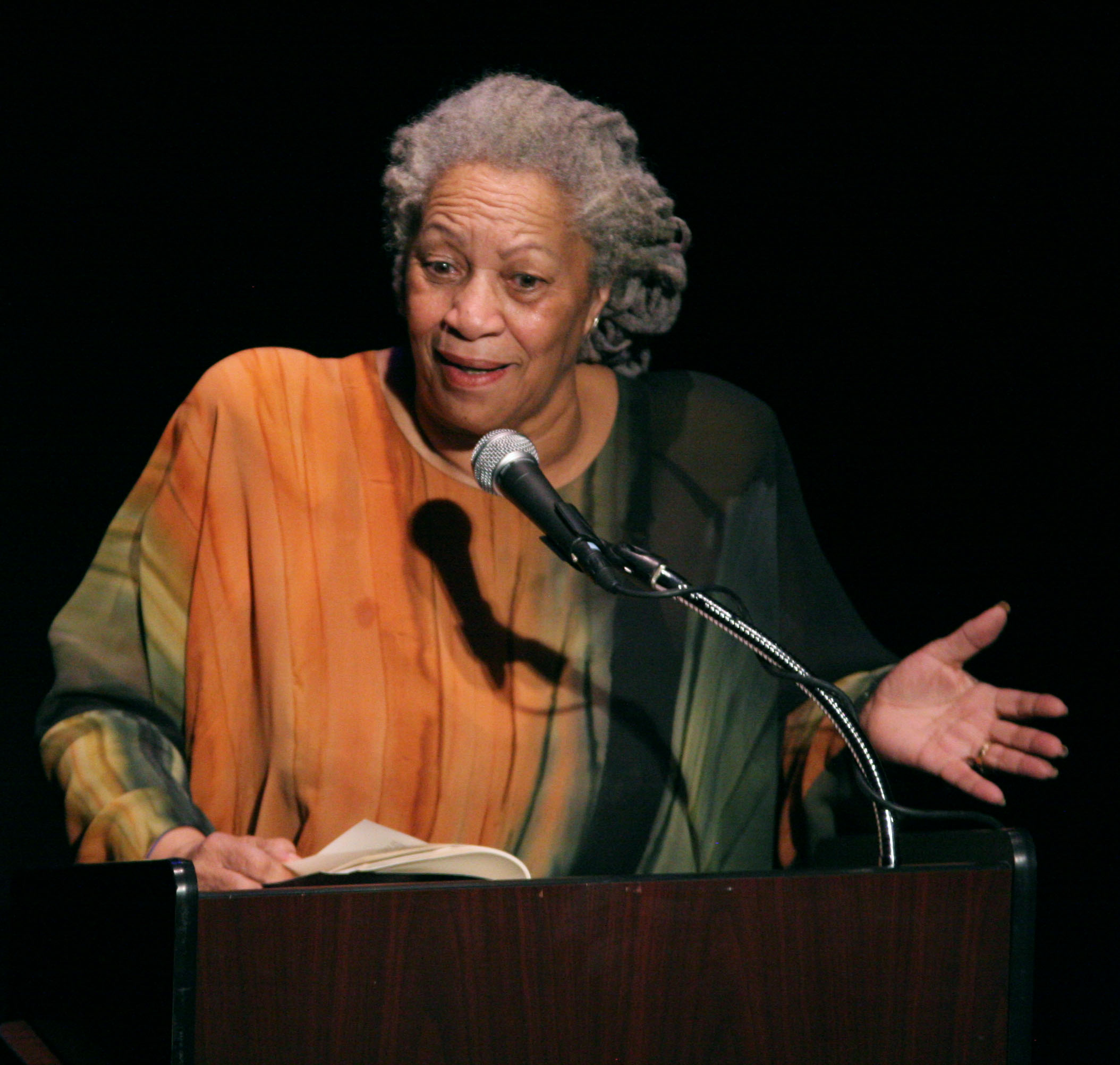
Toni Morrison

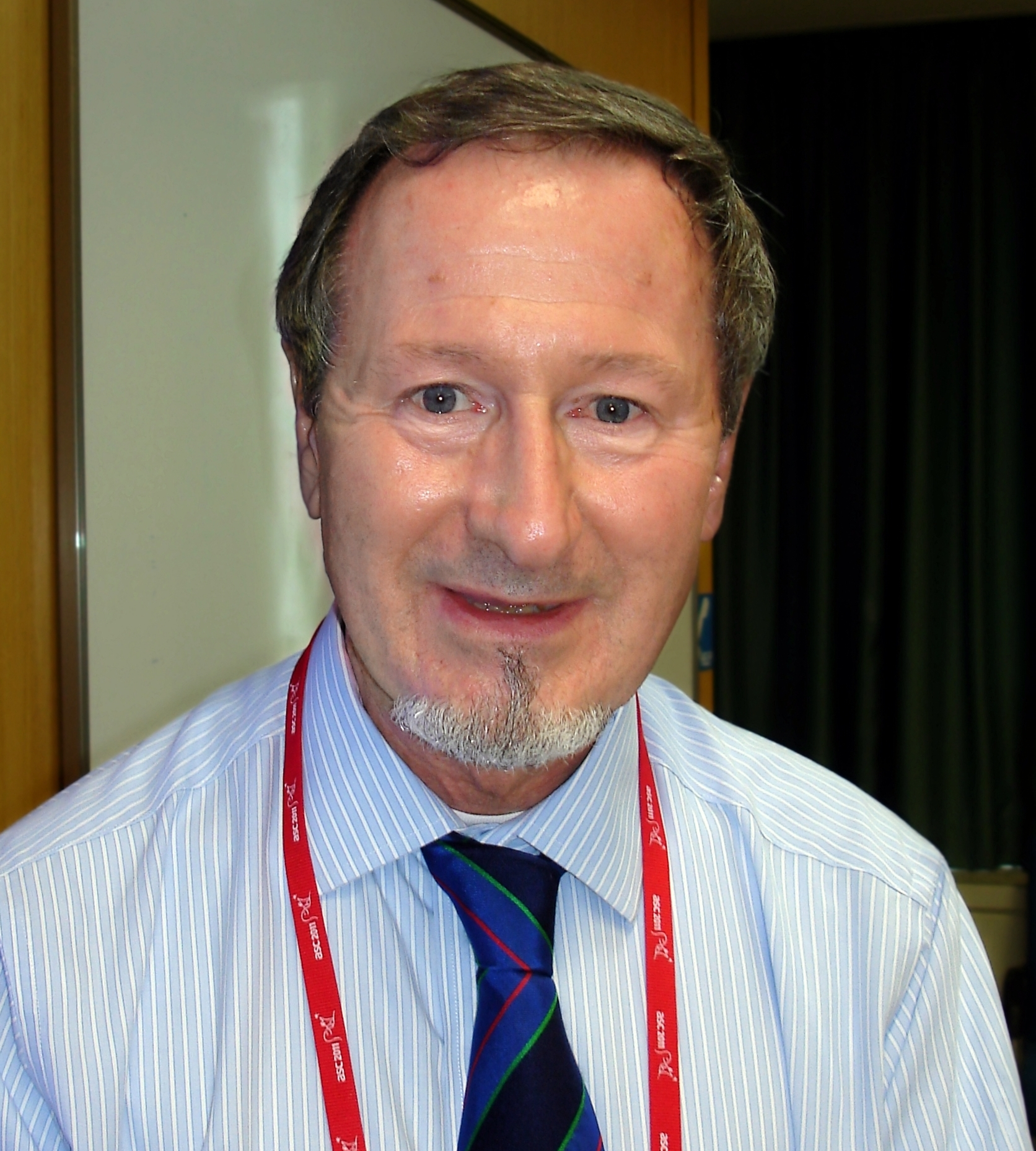
Douglas Osheroff

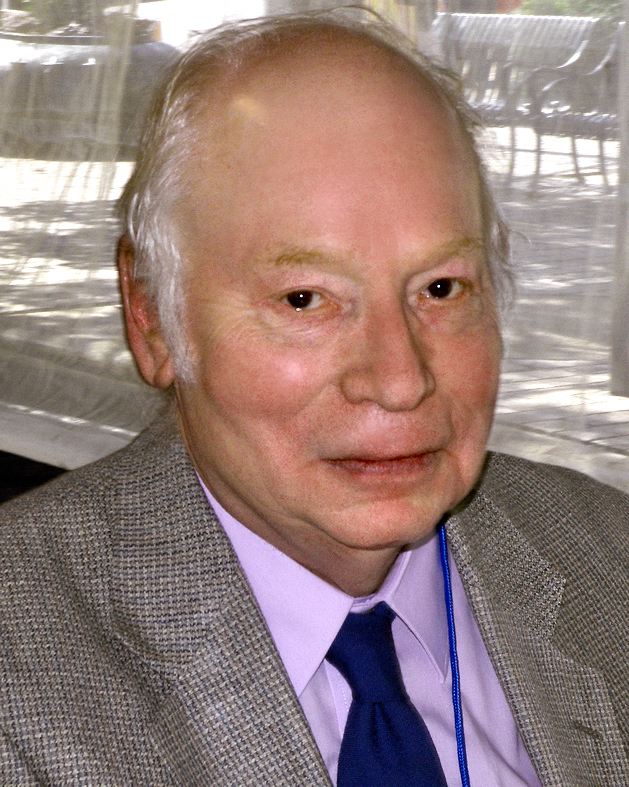
Steven Weinberg

=== Chemistry ===
- Eric Betzig (M.S. 1985; Ph.D. 1988, applied and engineering physics) – Chemistry, 2014; member of the National Academy of Sciences (2015)
- Joachim Frank (postdoctoral fellow 1972) – Chemistry, 2017; member of the National Academy of Sciences (2006)
- William Moerner (Ph.D. 1982, experimental physics) – Chemistry, 2014; Wolf Prize in Chemistry (2008); member of the National Academy of Sciences (2007)

=== Physics ===
- Arthur Ashkin (Ph.D. 1952 nuclear physics) – Physics 2018; pioneer in optical tweezers; member of the National Academy of Engineering (1984) and the National Academy of Sciences (1996); recipient of the Harvey Prize (2004)
- Sheldon Glashow (B.A. 1954 physics) – Physics 1979; Physics (1979); member of the National Academy of Sciences since 1977
- John Hopfield (Ph.D. 1958 physics) – Physics 2024; member of the National Academy of Sciences (1973), the American Philosophical Society, the American Academy of Arts and Sciences; recipient of the Oliver E. Buckley Condensed Matter Prize (1969), Harold Pender Award (2002), Dirac Medal (2002), Albert Einstein World Award of Science (2005); Benjamin Franklin Medal (2019); Boltzmann Medal (2022); MacArthur Fellow (1983)
- Russell Hulse – Physics 1993; conducted award-winning research at Cornell's affiliated Arecibo Observatory (1974)
- John M. Kosterlitz – Physics 2016; postdoctoral fellow (1973–1974); fellow of the American Physical Society; recipient of the Maxwell Medal and Prize (1981) and the Lars Onsager Prize (2000); member of the National Academy of Sciences, since 2017
- Douglas D. Osheroff (M.S. 1971 physics, Ph.D. 1973 physics) – Physics 1996; MacArthur Fellow (1981); member of the National Academy of Sciences, since 1987
- Isidor Isaac Rabi (B.Chem. 1919; graduate study 1921–23, transferred) – Physics 1944; member of the National Academy of Sciences, since 1940
- David J. Thouless (Ph.D. 1958) – Physics 2016; fellow of the Royal Society, of the American Physical Society and of the American Academy of Arts and Sciences; member of the National Academy of Sciences (1995); recipient of the Maxwell Medal and Prize (1973), the Wolf Prize in Physics (1990), the Paul Dirac Medal (1993), and the Lars Onsager Prize (2000)
- Steven Weinberg (B.A. 1954 physics) – Physics 1979, National Medal of Science (1991); member of the National Academy of Sciences (1972)

=== Peace, literature, or economics ===
- Pearl S. Buck (M.A. 1925 English literature) – Literature 1938
- Robert F. Engle (M.S. 1966 physics, Ph.D. 1969 economics) – Economics 2003; member of the National Academy of Sciences (2005)
- Robert Fogel (B.A. 1948 history, minor in economics) – Economics 1993; member of the National Academy of Sciences (1973)
- Claudia Goldin (B.A. 1967 economics) – Economics 2023; member of the National Academy of Sciences (2006)
- Toni Morrison (M.A. 1955 English) – A.D. White Professor-at-Large, 1997–2003) – Literature 1993; National Humanities Medal (2000), Pulitzer Prize for Fiction (1988)
- John Mott (B.S. 1888 philosophy) – Peace 1946

=== Physiology or medicine ===
- George Wells Beadle (Ph.D. 1930 genetics) – Physiology or Medicine 1958; member of the National Academy of Sciences (1944), Albert Lasker Award for Basic Medical Research (1950)
- Robert W. Holley (Ph.D. 1947 organic chemistry; professor and department chair in biochemistry, 1948–68) – Physiology or Medicine 1968; member of the National Academy of Sciences (1968), Albert Lasker Award for Basic Medical Research (1965)
- Barbara McClintock (B.S. 1923 botany, M.A. 1925 botany, Ph.D. 1927 cytology; instructor in botany, 1927–31; A.D. White Professor-at-Large, 1965–74) – Physiology or Medicine 1983; National Medal of Science (1970); MacArthur Fellow (1981); Wolf Prize in Medicine (1981); member of the National Academy of Sciences (1944), Albert Lasker Award for Basic Medical Research (1981)
- Hermann Joseph Muller (graduate study 1911–12) – Physiology or Medicine 1946; member of the National Academy of Sciences (1931)
- Jack W. Szostak (Ph.D. 1977 biochemistry) – Physiology or Medicine 2009; member of the National Academy of Sciences (1998), Albert Lasker Award for Basic Medical Research (2006)

== Psychology ==
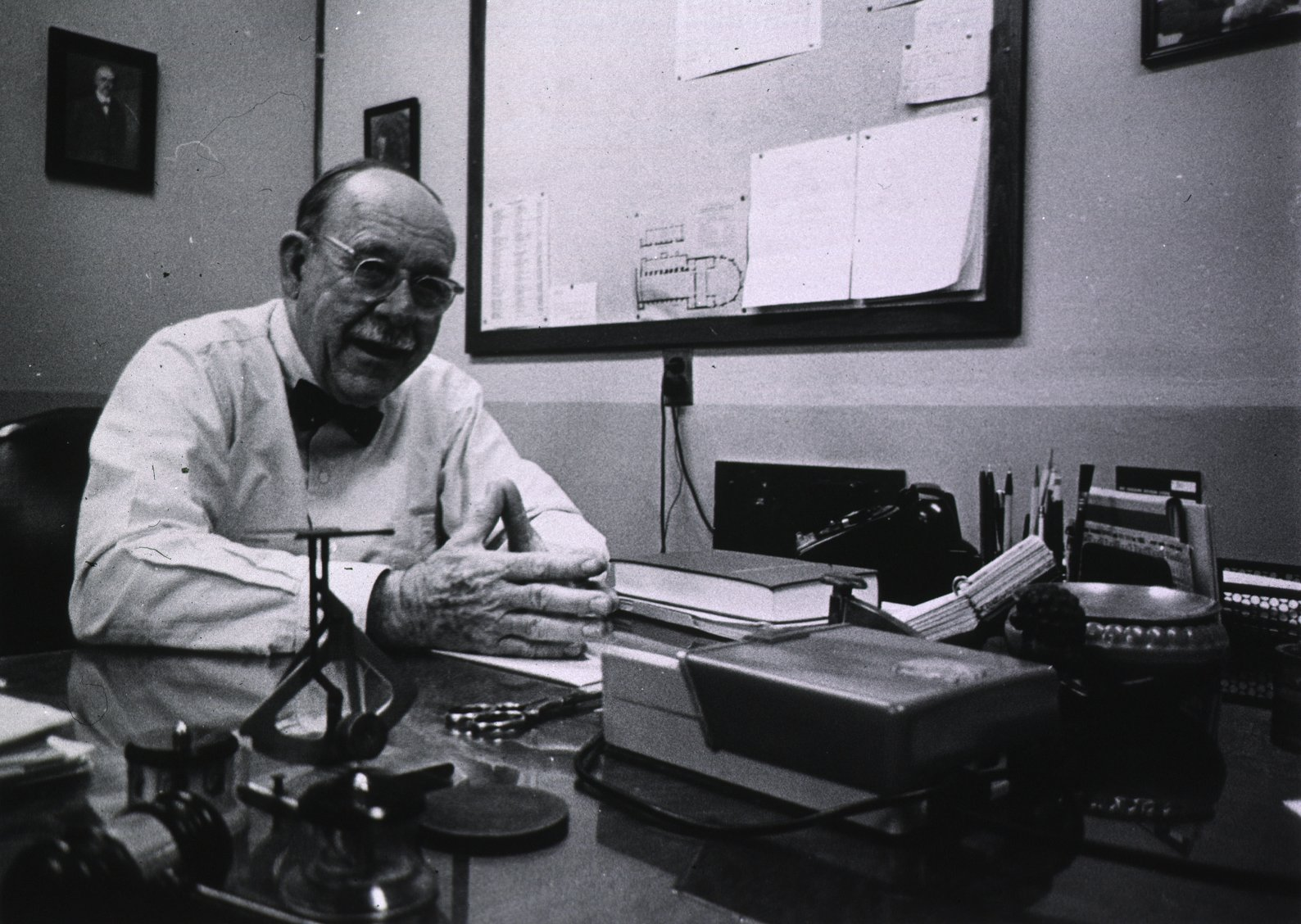
Edwin Boring

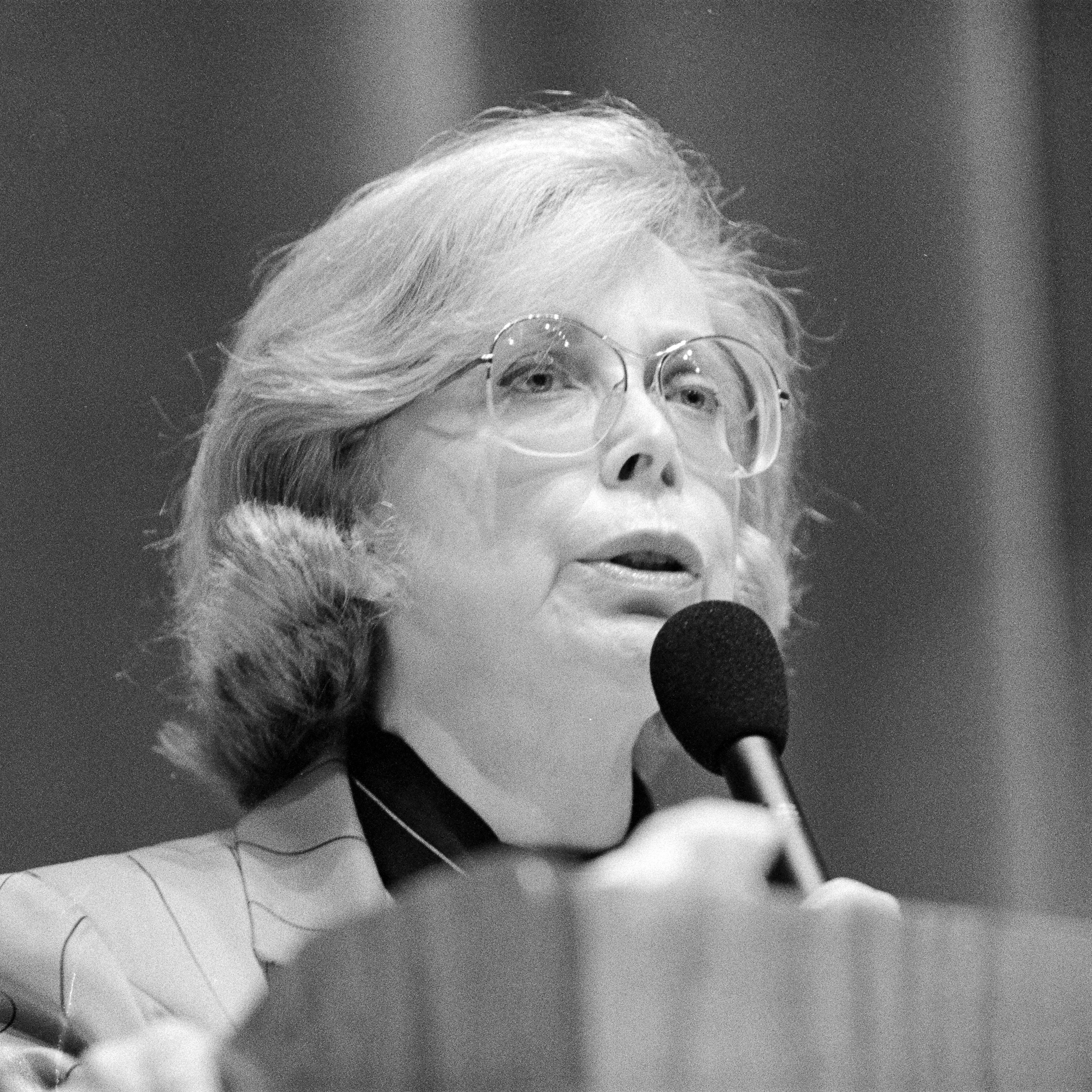
Joyce Brothers

- John Wallace Baird (Ph.D. 1902 psychology) – Canadian psychologist who served as the 27th president of the American Psychological Association (1918)
- I. Madison Bentley (Ph.D. 1899) – 34th president of the American Psychological Association (1925–1926); former faculty member and department chair of the Psychology Department at Cornell University
- Edwin Boring (1908, Ph.D. 1915 psychology; instructor of psychology 1913–1918) – experimental psychologist and historian of psychology; president of the American Psychological Association (1928), member of the National Academy of Sciences (1932)
- Urie Bronfenbrenner (B.A. 1938 psychology and music; Jacob Gould Schurman Professor Emeritus of Human Development and Psychology) – psychologist, pioneer in developmental psychology (Ecological Systems Theory), founder of the field of human ecology; co-founder of national Head Start program
- Joyce Brothers (B.S. 1947) – author, psychologist, and television personality
- Serena Chen – social psychologist
- Karl M. Dallenbach (Ph.D. 1913; faculty member 1916–1948) – experimental psychologist and editor of the American Journal of Psychology
- John E. Exner (Ph.D. 1958 clinical psychology) – psychologist known for Exner system of scoring
- J. P. Guilford (Ph.D. 1927) – psychologist at the University of Southern California who served as the president of the American Psychological Association (1950); member of the National Academy of Sciences (1954)
- Suzanne Bennett Johnson (B.A. 1970 psychology) – psychologist, served as the president of the American Psychological Association (2012)
- James Maas (M.A., Ph.D.; professor of Psychology) – psychologist, coined the term "power nap"
- Abraham Maslow (undergrad 1928–29, transferred) – psychologist best known for Maslow's hierarchy of needs; president of the American Psychological Association (1968)
- Helen Neville (Ph.D. Neuropsychology) – psychologist and neuroscientist at the University of Oregon; member of the National Academy of Sciences (2014); fellow of the American Academy of Arts and Sciences and of the American Psychological Society
- Frank Parsons (B.S. civil engineering) – founder of the field of vocational psychology.
- Walter Bowers Pillsbury (Ph.D. 1896) – psychologist who was on faculty with the University of Michigan for his entire career; president of the American Psychological Association (1910–1911), member of the National Academy of Sciences (1925)
- Frank Rosenblatt (A.B. 1950, Ph.D. 1956) – psychologist in the field of artificial intelligence; inventor of the perceptron algorithm.
- Elizabeth Spelke (Ph.D.) – cognitive psychologist; psychology professor at the University of Pennsylvania, Cornell University, MIT and Harvard University; fellow of the Society of Experimental Psychologists, the American Academy of Arts and Sciences and the American Association for the Advancement of Science; member of the National Academy of Sciences; recipient of the 2009 Jean Nicod Prize
- Robert Spitzer (B.A. 1953 psychology) – professor of psychiatry at Columbia University, known for modernizing the classification of mental disorders and recognizing homosexuality as a non-mental disorder
- Louis Leon Thurstone (Master of Mechanical Engineering 1912) – pioneer in the fields of psychometrics and psychophysics; He conceived the approach to measurement known as the law of comparative judgment, and is well known for his contributions to factor analysis; president of the American Psychological Association (1933); co-founder and first president of the Psychometric Society (1936); Fellow of the American Statistical Association and member of the National Academy of Sciences (1938)
- Margaret Floy Washburn (Ph.D. 1894) – psychologist, first female Ph.D. in psychology; president of the American Psychological Association (1921–1922); member of the National Academy of Sciences (1931)
- Bob McMurray (BA) Cognitive Psychology; psychology professor at Iowa State University

== Religion ==
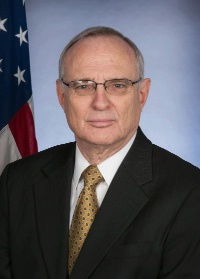
David Saperstein

- Georgia Harkness (1912) – Methodist theologian and philosopher
- Homer Alexander Jack (B.A. 1936, M.S. 1937, Ph.D. 1940) – Unitarian Universalist minister and early activist for peace, disarmament, racial equality and social justice; Niwano Peace Prize (1984), Jamnalal Bajaj Award (1992)
- G. Ashton Oldham (A.B. 1902) – Episcopal bishop, peace activist, and writer
- David Saperstein (B.A.) – Reform Jewish leader, former U.S. ambassador-at-large for International Religious Freedom

== Science and medicine ==
- Sidney A. Bludman – professor of physics at the University of Pennsylvania
- Henry Arthur Callis – physician and professor of medicine at Howard University; one of seven founders of Alpha Phi Alpha fraternity, served as its general president in 1915
- Christopher Batten, Professor of Computer Engineering
- Gina Eosco (M.S. 2008, PhD 2015) – social scientist and risk communications professional specializing in social and behavioral sciences as applied to weather forecasting and hazard communication
- William Flatt (PhD 1955) – animal and nutritional scientist
- Roger H. French (B.Sc. 1979) – Kyocera Professor in the Case School of Engineering at Case Western Reserve University
- Evelyn Groesbeeck Mitchell (B.A. 1902) – physician and researcher
- Gad Saad (born 1964) - Lebanese-born Canadian evolutionary behavioral scientist
- James A. Shayman (B.A. 1976) – physician-scientist, nephrologist, and pharmacologist
- Martha Allen Sherwood (PhD 1977) – lichenologist
- Mary Louisa Willard (PhD 1927) – chemist and forensic scientist
- Alfreda Bosworth Withington – physician and author

== Sports ==
=== Baseball ===
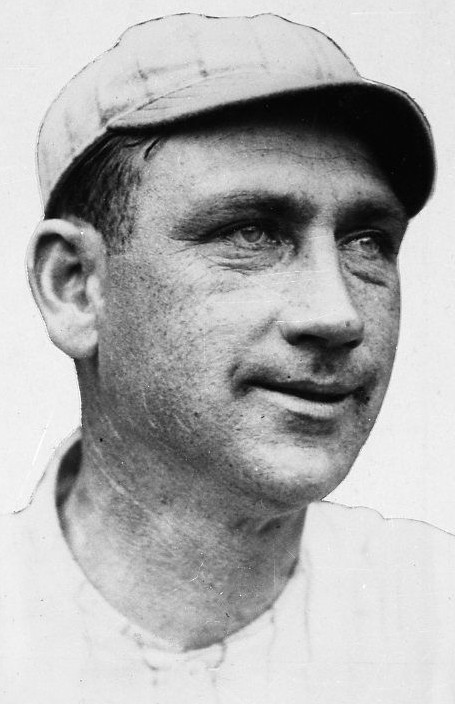
Hughie Jennings

- Joe Birmingham – baseball player, Cleveland Naps, 1906–1914
- Jon Daniels (B.S. 1999) – general manager of the Texas Rangers, youngest GM ever in Major League Baseball
- Robert A. DuPuy (J.D. 1973) – former president and chief operating officer of Major League Baseball (MLB)
- Joseph Iglehart (1914) – chairman of the board, Baltimore Orioles, 1955–1965
- Hughie Jennings (LL.B. study 1901–1904, dropped out; baseball coach, 1899–?) – Baseball Hall of Fame-inducted shortstop; Louisville Colonels (1891–1893), Baltimore Orioles (1893–1899), Brooklyn Superbas (1899–1900, 1903), Philadelphia Phillies (1901–02), Detroit Tigers (1907, 1909, 1912, 1918)
- Rob Manfred (B.S. 1980) – chief operating officer of Major League Baseball; 10th commissioner of Major League Baseball
- A. J. Preller (B.S. 1999) – general manager of the Major League Baseball's San Diego Padres 2014–
- Brandon Taubman (B.A. 2007) – assistant general manager of the Houston Astros, 2018–2019
- Bill Walkenbach (B.A. 1998) – Cornell head baseball coach

=== Basketball ===
- Bryan Colangelo (B.S. 1987) – president and general manager of the Toronto Raptors, 2005, 2007 NBA Executive of the Year
- Jon Jaques – American-Israeli assistant men's basketball coach for Cornell University, who played for Ironi Ashkelon in Israel
- Chris Mañon – basketball player for the Los Angeles Lakers
- Nat Militzok (1923–2009) – New York Knicks basketball player
- Larry Weinberg – co-founder and president (1975–1988) of the NBA's Portland Trail Blazers

=== Football ===
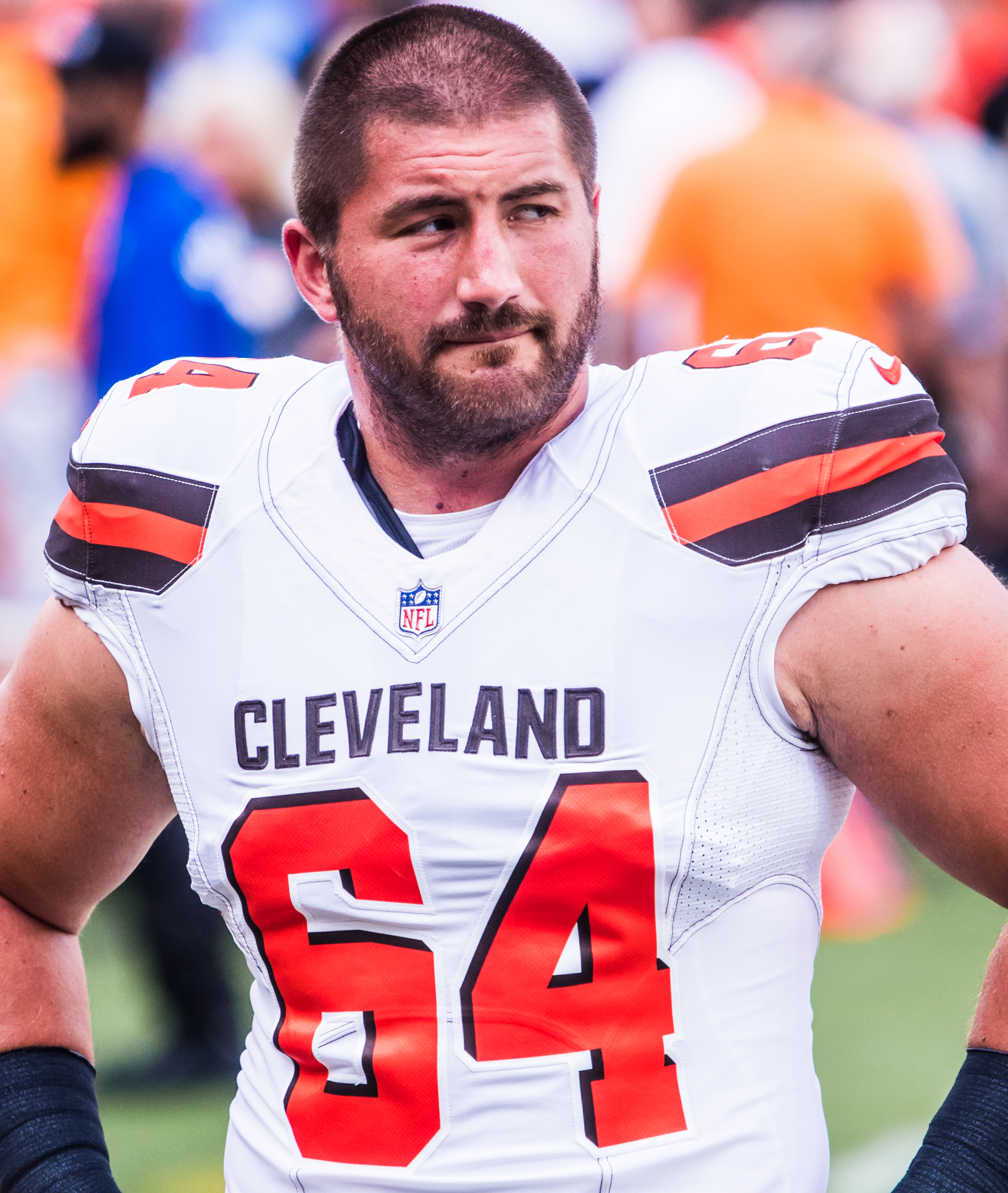
JC Tretter

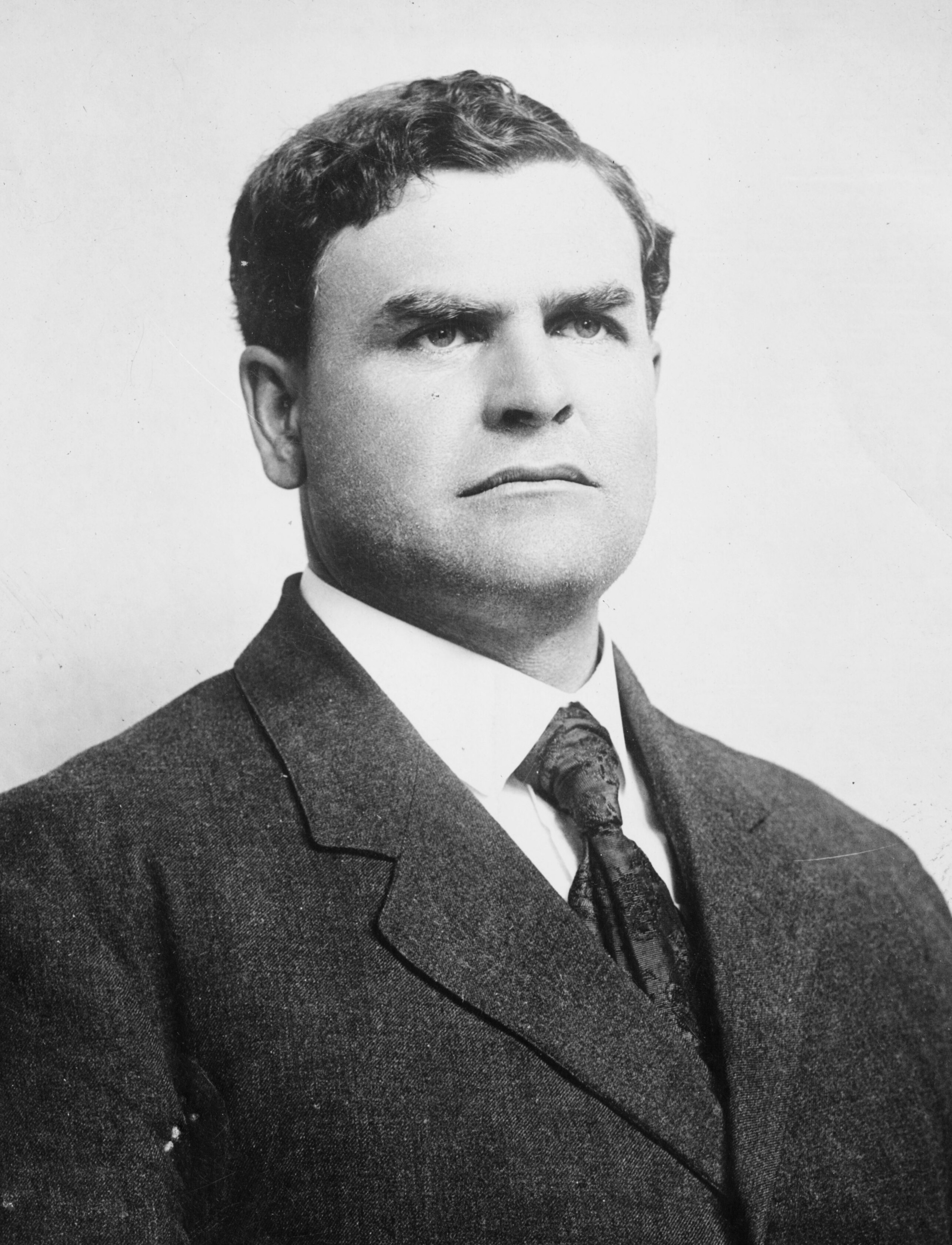
Pop Warner

- Greg Bloedorn (1995) – former NFL offensive lineman and long snapper for the Seattle Seahawks
- Kevin Boothe (B.S. 2005 hotel administration) – former lineman for the Oakland Raiders and New York Giants
- Al Dekdebrun – Buffalo Bisons, 1946, Chicago Rockets, 1947, Boston Yanks, 1948, New York Yankees, 1948
- Pete Gogolak (1964) – Buffalo Bills 1964–1965, New York Giants, 1966–1975; first "soccer style" kicker in professional "American" football
- Derrick Harmon (1984) – San Francisco 49ers 1984–1986
- Mort Landsberg (1919–1970) – NFL player
- Bill Lazor (1994) – NFL assistant coach
- Chad Levitt (1997) – Oakland Raiders, St. Louis Rams
- Ed Marinaro (B.S. 1972) – Minnesota Vikings, New York Jets, and Seattle Seahawks; runner-up for the 1971 Heisman Trophy Award, actor on Hill Street Blues
- Jeff Mathews (2014) – quarterback for the Hamilton Tiger-Cats
- Lou Molinet (1928) – Frankford Yellow Jackets, 1927 first Hispanic-American player in the National Football League
- Seth Payne (1997) – Jacksonville Jaguars, 1997–2001, Houston Texans, 2001–2007
- Lee Reherman (1988) – Miami Dolphins, actor on American Gladiators and X-Files
- Luke Tasker (2013) – wide receiver for the Hamilton Tiger-Cats
- JC Tretter (2012) – offensive guard for the Green Bay Packers (2013–2016) and Cleveland Browns (2017–2021), president (2020–2024) and executive director (2026–present) NFL Players Association
- Bryan Walters (2010) – wide receiver for the San Diego Chargers 2010–2011, Seattle Seahawks (2012–2014), Jacksonville Jaguars (2015–2016)
- Pop Warner (LL.B. 1894, football coach) – football player and coach; founder of Pop Warner Little Scholars
- Gary Wood (1964) – New York Giants 1964–1966, 1968–1969, New Orleans Saints, 1967

=== Ice hockey ===
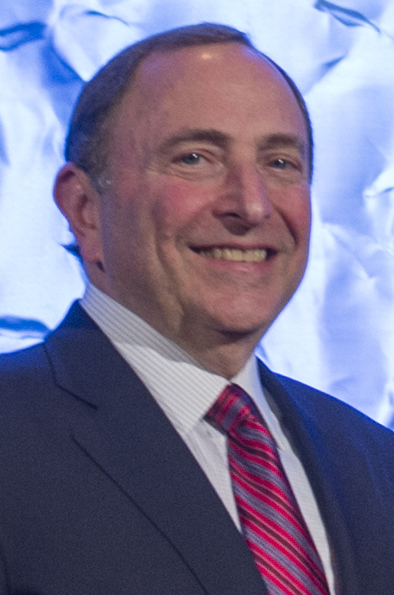
Gary Bettman

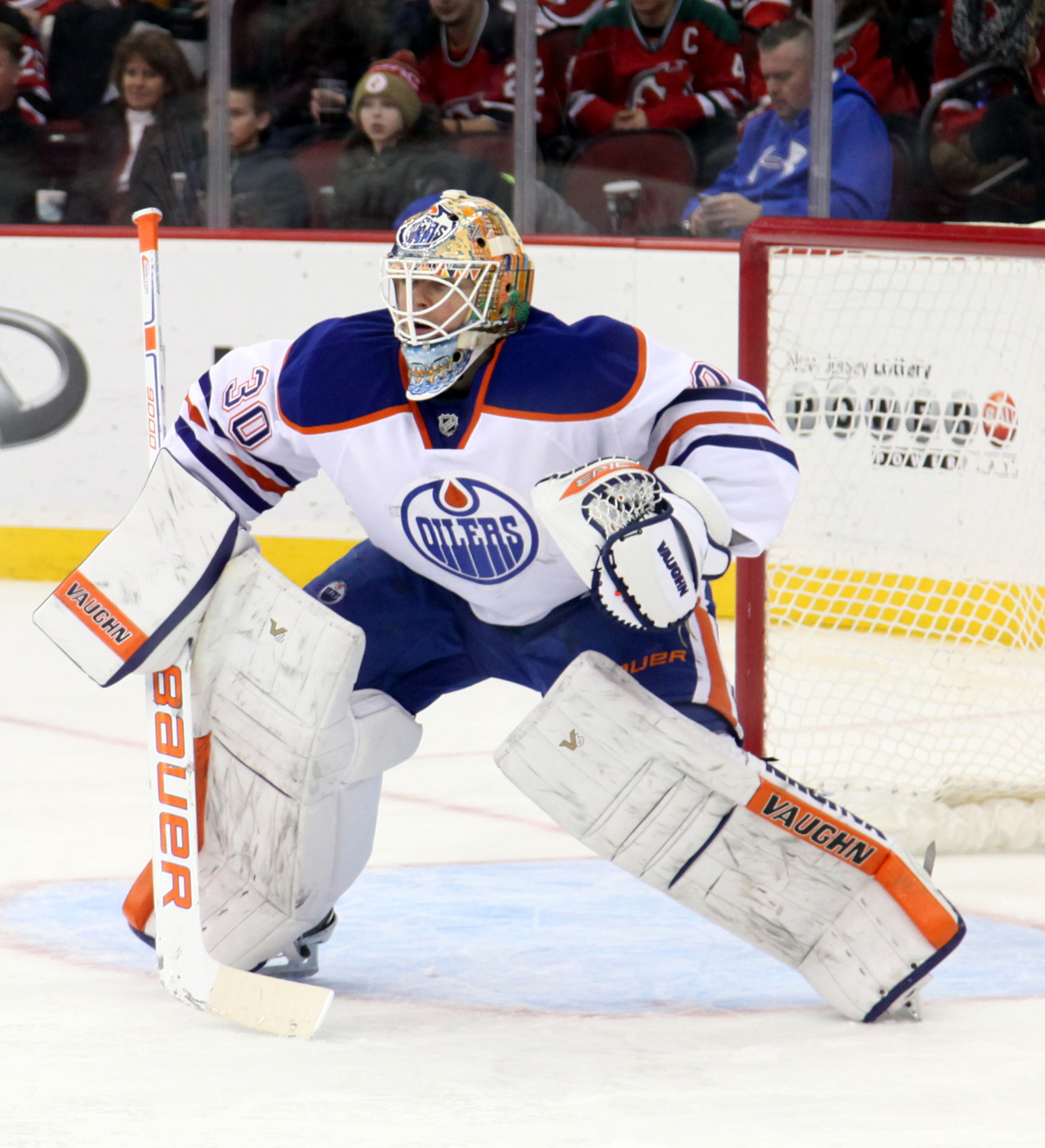
Ben Scrivens

- Gary Bettman (B.S. 1974) – commissioner of the NHL (1993–)
- Byron Bitz (2007) – forward for the Boston Bruins 2008–2010, Florida Panthers 2010–2011, Vancouver Canucks 2011–2012
- Ken Dryden (B.A. 1969) – NHL Hockey Hall of Fame goaltender, six-time Stanley Cup winner, Conn Smythe Trophy winner, Calder Memorial Trophy winner, Canadian Member of Parliament
- Colin Greening (2010) – Centre for the Ottawa Senators 2011–2015, Toronto Maple Leafs 2016–2019
- Ned Harkness (lacrosse and hockey head coach) – Coach of Cornell NCAA hockey champions in 1967 and 1970; previously RPI coach of 1954 national champs; also head coach and then general manager of the Detroit Red Wings
- David LeNeveu – NHL goalie, previously for the Phoenix Coyotes
- Matt Moulson (2006) – left wing for the Buffalo Sabres, and previously New York Islanders and Minnesota Wild.
- Douglas Murray (2003) – defenseman for Montreal Canadiens and previously San Jose Sharks and Pittsburgh Penguins, 2010 Olympian
- Riley Nash (2007–2010) – centre for the Columbus Blue Jackets, formerly of the Boston Bruins and Carolina Hurricanes, 2011–present
- Lance Nethery – NHL player, executive in the German Elite League
- Joe Nieuwendyk (1988) – NHL player, three-time Stanley Cup champion, 2002 Olympic gold medalist
- Ryan O'Byrne (2007) – former NHL defenseman for the Montreal Canadiens and Colorado Avalanche
- Rick Olczyk (Law 1996) – Assistant general manager of the Carolina Hurricanes
- Joakim Ryan (2015) – NHL defenseman for the Los Angeles Kings and previously for the San Jose Sharks
- Ben Scrivens (2010) – former NHL goaltender for the Montreal Canadiens, Toronto Maple Leafs, Los Angeles Kings and Edmonton Oilers
- Ryan Vesce (2004) – right wing for the San Jose Sharks, 2008–2010

=== Lacrosse ===
- Mike French (1976) – All-American lacrosse player at Cornell 1974–1976, leading the "Big Red" to the NCAA Men's Lacrosse Championship in 1976
- CJ Kirst (2025) – recipient of Tewaaraton Trophy (2025) and Lt. Raymond Enners Award (2025), three-time All-American, most career goals in NCAA Division I Lacrosse history (247), most goals in a single season in NCAA Division I history (82, in 2025), National Champion (2025)
- Daniel R. Mackesey (1977) – received NCAA Top Five Award in 1978 for lacrosse and soccer; inducted into National Lacrosse Hall of Fame in 2006
- Eamon McEneaney (1977) – All-American lacrosse player at Cornell 1975–1977, leading the "Big Red" to the NCAA Men's Lacrosse Championship in 1976 and 1977; died in the September 11 attacks on the World Trade Center
- Rob Pannell (2013) – professional lacrosse player for the New York Lizards; recipient of Lt. Raymond Enners Award (2013) and Tewaaraton Trophy (2013)
- Max Seibald (2009) – three-time First Team All-American, recipient of Tewaaraton Trophy (2007)

=== Olympians ===
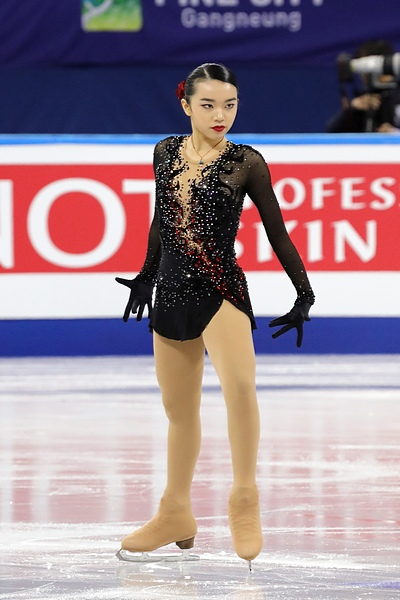
Olympic medalist Karen Chen

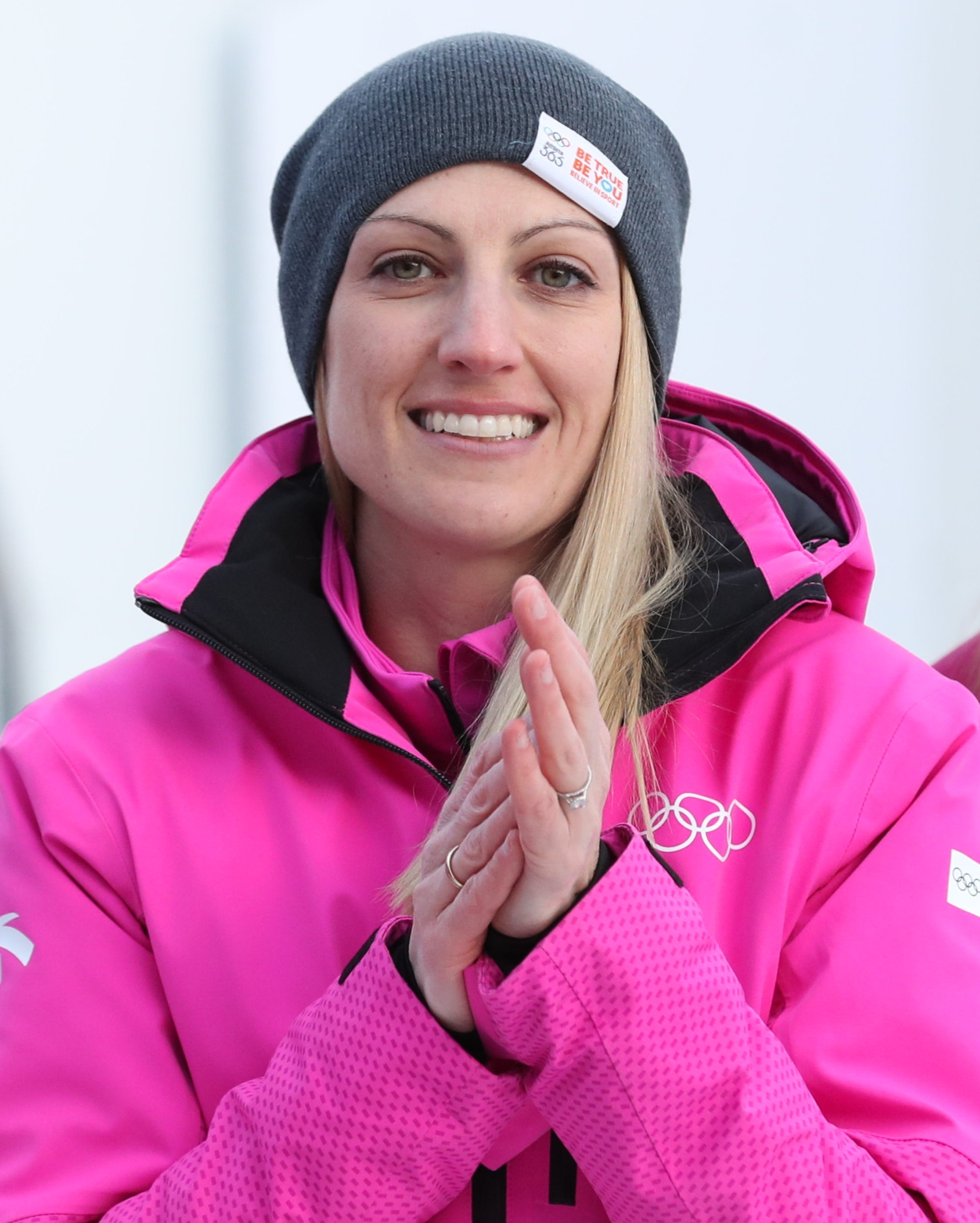
Jamie Greubel

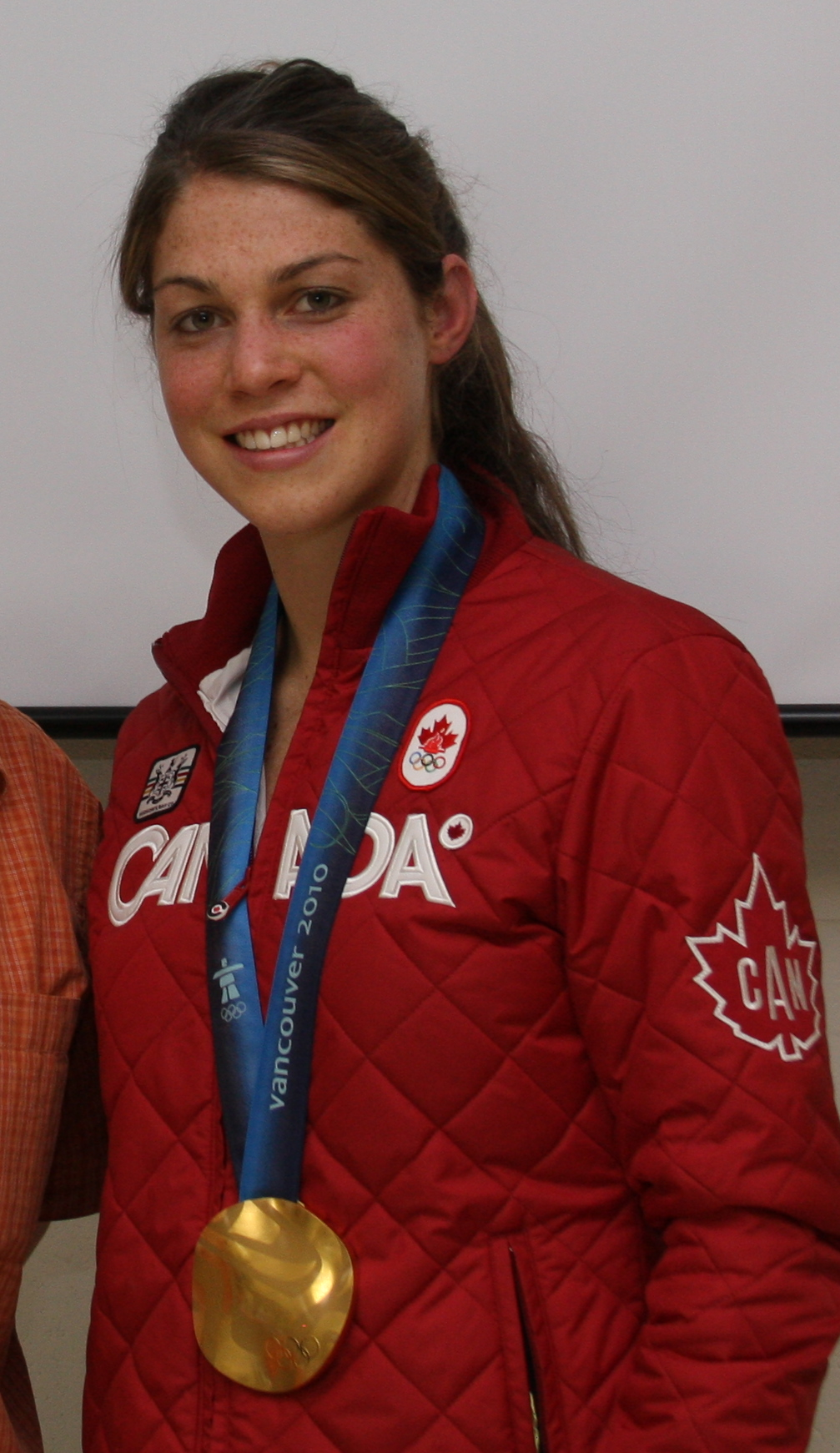
Rebecca Johnston

- Jon Anderson (1971) – 1972 Olympian, track; winner of 1973 Boston Marathon
- Karen Chen (2025) – gold medalist at 2022 Winter Olympics
- Edward Tiffin Cook Jr. (1910) – men's pole vault Olympic gold medalist in 1908 Summer Olympics
- Darren Eliot (1983) – NHL player, Los Angeles Kings, Detroit Red Wings, Buffalo Sabres; 1984 Olympian
- Jamie Greubel (2006) – bronze medalist in two-woman bobsleigh at the 2014 Sochi games
- Muhammad Halim (2008) – competed in the 2012 and 2016 Olympic games, triple jump
- Albert Hall (1956) – four-time Olympian (1956, 1960, 1964, 1968), hammer throw
- Rebecca Johnston (2012) – four-time Olympic medalist for Canada
- Robert J. Kane (1934, director of athletics) – U.S. Olympic Committee president, 1976–1980; inducted into U.S. Olympic Hall of Fame, 1986
- Kent Manderville (1993) – NHL player, Calgary Flames, Pittsburgh Penguins; 1992 Olympic silver medalist with Team Canada
- Edith Master (born 1932) – Olympic bronze medalist equestrian
- Travis Mayer (undergrad 2000–01, on leave) – Olympic freestyle skiing silver medalist
- Charles Moore (1951, director of Athletics, 1994–1999) – 1952 Olympic gold medalist (hurdles) and silver medalist (1600-meter relay); honored as Golden Olympian, 1996
- Pablo Morales (J.D. 1994) – three-time Olympic gold medalist in swimming, 1984 and 1992
- David Munson (1906) – four-mile team Olympic gold medalist in 1904 Summer Olympics; inducted into the Cornell University Athletic Hall of Fame in 1988
- Richard Pew (1956) – 1956 Summer Olympics, épée fencing
- Harry Porter (1905) – 1908 Summer Olympics high jump gold medalist
- Alma Richards (1917) – 1912 Summer Olympics high jump gold medalist
- Bo Roberson (1958) – the only person to earn an Ivy League degree, an Olympic medal, a doctorate, and have a career in the NFL
- Jamie Silverstein (undergrad 2002–2004, 2006–) – Olympic figure skater
- Donald Spero – Olympic rower, world champion, and venture capitalist
- Rudy Winkler (2017) - Olympic hammer thrower

=== Racing ===
- Bill Jenkins – NHRA drag car racer
- Teddy Mayer (J.D.) – motor racing team manager
- Peter Revson – race car driver

=== Tennis ===
- William Larned – seven-time U.S. tennis championship winner
- Dick Savitt (born 1927) – tennis player, ranked No. 2 in the world

=== Wrestling ===
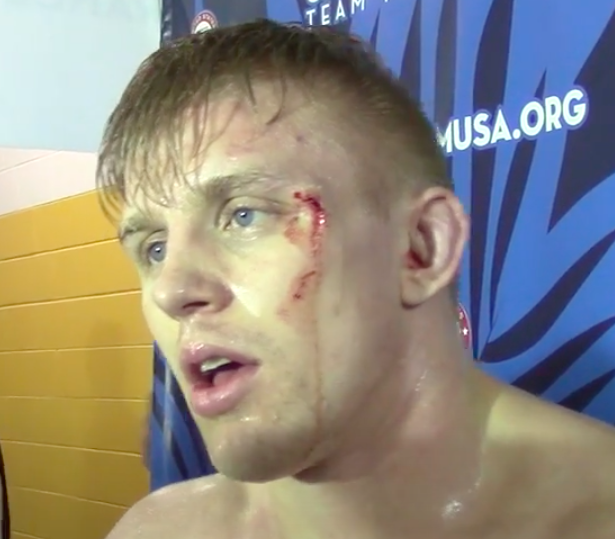
Kyle Dake

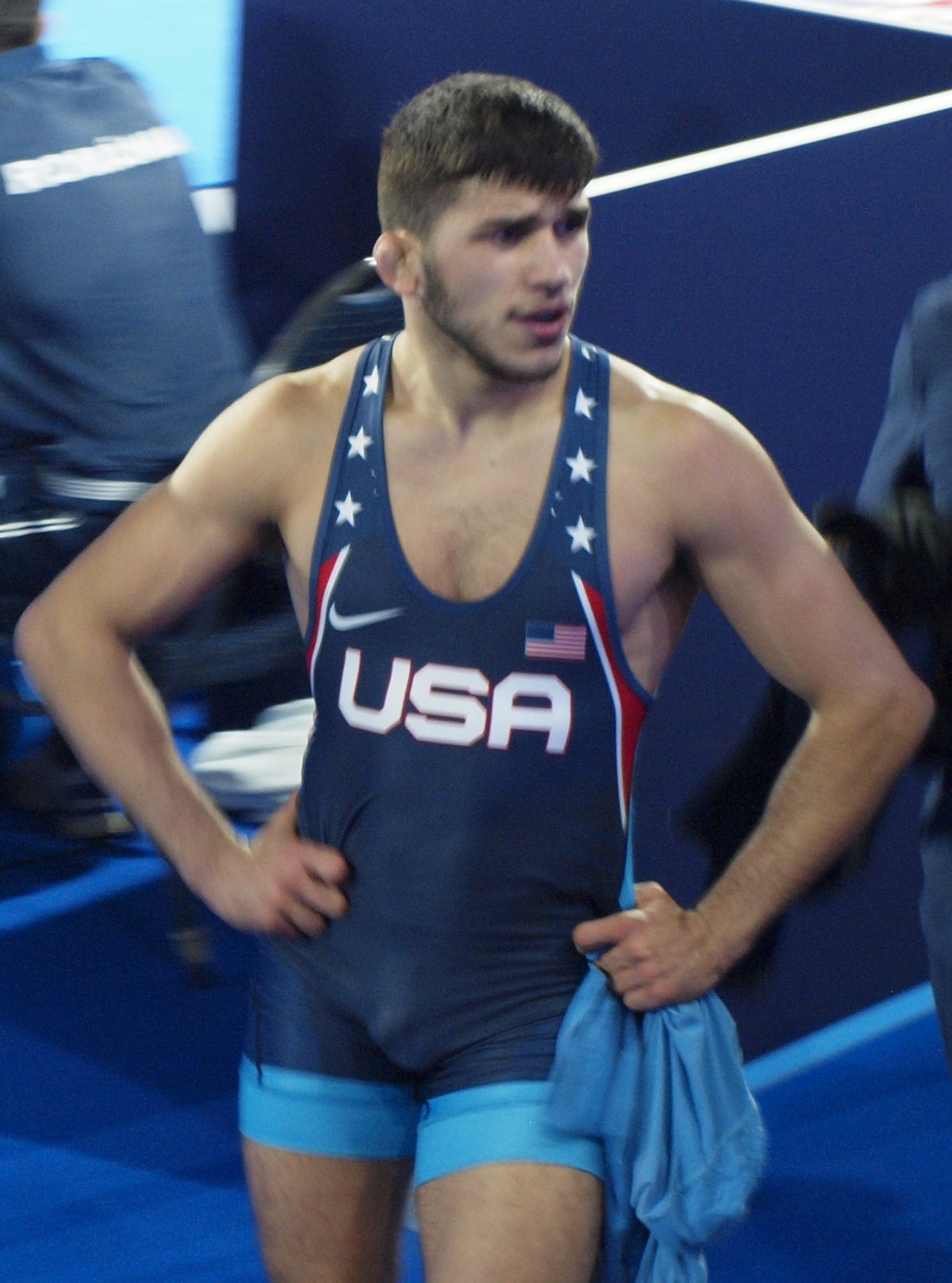
Yianni Diakomihalis

- Kyle Dake (B.A. 2013) – freestyle wrestling Olympic Gold Medalist in 2020, World Champion (2018, 2019, 2021), World Cup gold medalist (2018) – four-time NCAA Division I individual national titleholder in 2010, 2011, 2012, and 2013
- Joe DeMeo – U.S. Olympic wrestling assistant coach
- Yianni Diakomihalis – freestyle and folkstyle wrestling, three-time NCAA Division I individual national titleholder in 2018, 2019, and 2021

=== Other ===
- Bruce Arena (B.S. 1971) – five-time NCAA Soccer Championship coach at the University of Virginia; coach of Major League Soccer's D.C. United; coach of U.S. national team; coach of MLS's New York Red Bulls; present coach of MLS's Los Angeles Galaxy
- Olivier Busquet – professional poker player
- Clarence C. Combs Jr. – polo player, two-time winner of the Monty Waterbury Cup
- Brian Hastings – professional poker player
- Alexander Kevitz (1923) – chess master
- Saurabh Netravalkar – cricketer
- John Nickles (1986) – triathlete; winner of the World Champion Title in the 1999 Hawaii Ultraman World Championship; Ultra Marathon Cycling Association world record holder in 1994
- Dave Sarachan – head coach of Major League Soccer's Chicago Fire (2002–2007)
- Doug J. Smylie (attended and played football for Cornell) – Canadian football player (1945–1953), for the Toronto Argonauts, Montreal Alouettes and Ottawa Rough Riders
- Donald Spero – rower
- Jonathan Tamayo (B.S. 2008) – professional poker player
- Carl F. Ullrich (B.S. 1950) – athletic director at West Point, 1980–1990; executive director of the Patriot League, 1989–1993
- Dan Wood (Ph.D. 1977) – five-year Cornell golf and soccer coach (1970s); coached the Tacoma Tides, Colorado Caribous and Atlanta Chiefs; turned professional golfer in 1980

== Crime ==
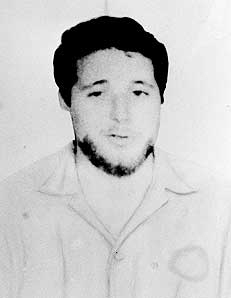
Michael Schwerner

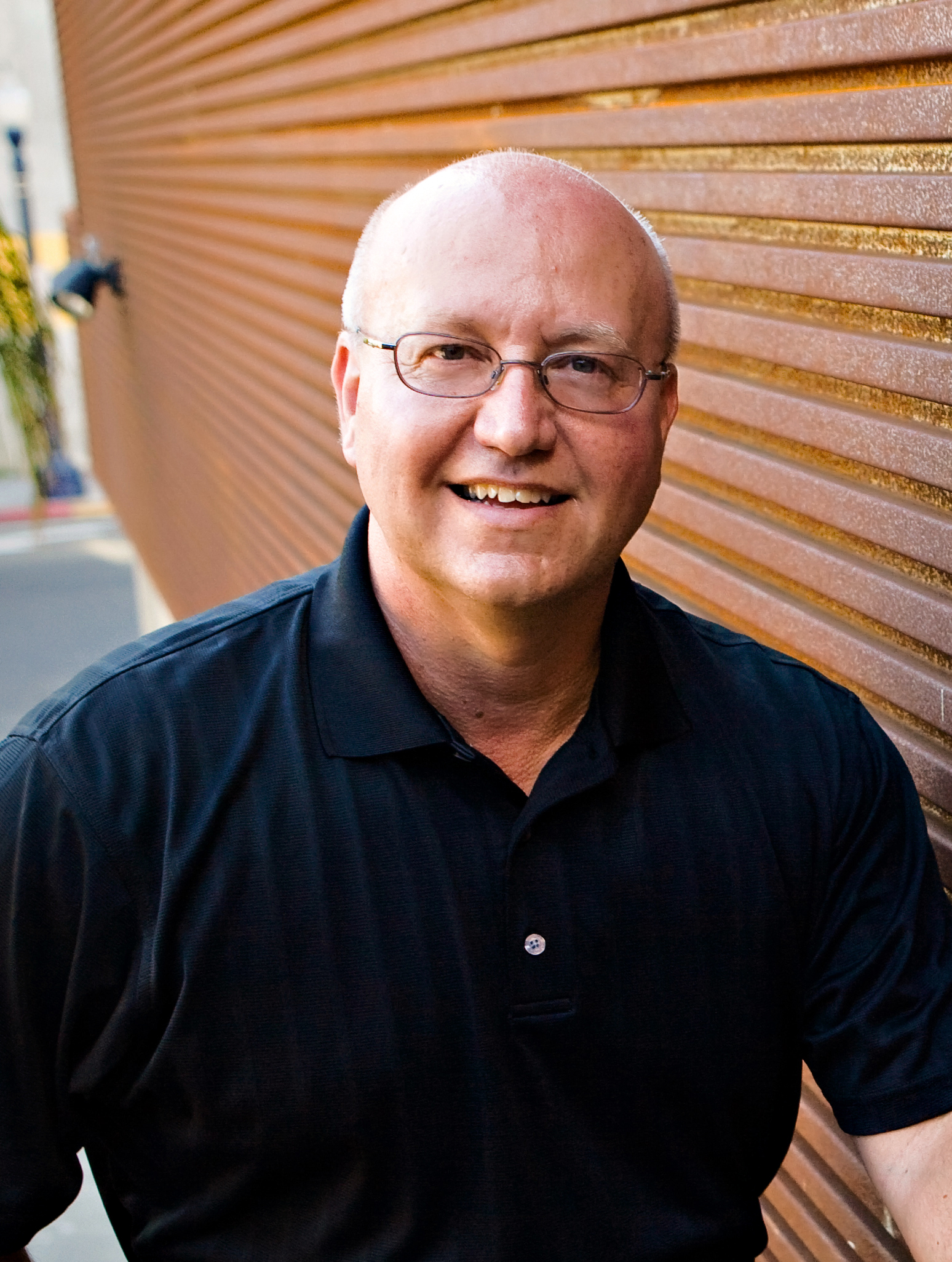
Mark Whitacre

- Nick Berg (undergrad 1996–98, transferred) – businessman beheaded by Islamic militants on May 7, 2004, during the U.S.-led occupation of Iraq
- Leo Frank (B.S. 1906 engineering) – factory manager; lynched in 1915 for the alleged murder of a 13-year-old girl; later believed to be innocent; subject of the musical Parade
- David G. Friehling (B.S. 1981) – accountant to Ponzi schemer Bernard Madoff
- Mark Gerard (D.V.M., 1962) – perpetrated horse racing fraud, switching horses' identities
- Peter Huang (graduate study 1966–did not graduate) – political activist and failed assassin
- Katrina Leung (B.S. 1976) – accused spy; case dismissed; later sentenced to terms of plea agreement
- Robert Tappan Morris (graduate study 1988–89, suspended) – author of the Morris Worm, which crippled the Internet in 1988
- Michael Ross (B.S. 1981 agricultural economics) – convicted serial killer executed in Connecticut on May 13, 2005
- Michael Schwerner (B.A. 1961 sociology) – victim in the murders of Chaney, Goodman, and Schwerner by the Ku Klux Klan in 1964
- Mark Whitacre (Ph.D. 1983 nutritional biochemistry) – highest-ranked executive in U.S. history of a Fortune 500 company to turn whistleblower and FBI informant; pleaded guilty to fraud

== Other ==
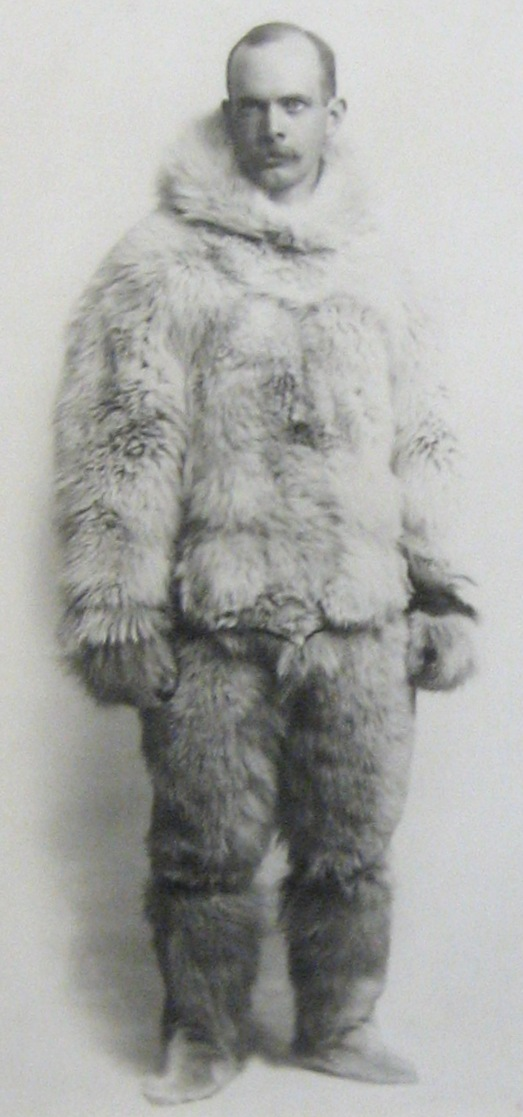
Ross Gilmore Marvin

- Lisa Daugaard (M.A. 1987) – 2019 MacArthur Fellow and criminal justice reform advocate
- Gregory K. Dreicer (Ph.D. Science and Technology Studies) – curatorial strategist, historian of technology, experience designer, exhibition developer, and museum manager
- Eric Erickson (1921 engineering) – Swedish oil executive who worked for U.S. intelligence during World War II. Was the basis for The Counterfeit Traitor, a book and film
- Jesse Root Grant (undergrad 1874–77, dropped out) – son of U.S. President Ulysses S. Grant
- Anna Roosevelt Halsted (did not graduate) – daughter of U.S. President Franklin Roosevelt
- Rutherford P. Hayes (B.S. 1880) – vice president and acting president of the American Library Association and third son of U.S. President Rutherford B. Hayes
- William H. Hinton (1941 agronomy and dairy husbandry) – farmer and writer
- Genevieve Hughes (B.A. 1954) – one of the 13 original Freedom Riders
- Zach Iscol (Government 2001) – entrepreneur, U.S. Marine, and 2021 New York City Comptroller election candidate
- Imogene Powers Johnson (B.S. 1952) – billionaire and philanthropist
- Carol Levine (B.A. 1956) – HIV/AIDS policy specialist and 1993 MacArthur Fellow
- Ross Gilmore Marvin (B.A. 1905) – Arctic explorer with Robert Peary who died during their 1908–1909 expedition
- Natasha Pickowicz (B.A.) – pastry chef and cookbook author
- Stephanie Rader (B.A. 1937) – undercover intelligence agent and 2016 Legion of Merit recipient
- May Gorslin Preston Slosson (Ph.D. 1880) – suffragist and the first woman in the U.S. to earn a Ph.D. in philosophy

== Fictional alumni ==
Several movies, television shows, and novels have included fictional Cornellians. In television, Andy Bernard on The Office (2005–2013), Gary Walsh on Veep (2012–2019), Tom Kirkman on Designated Survivor (2016–2018), Mitchell Pritchett on Modern Family (2009–2020), Tom Wambsgans on Succession (2018–2023), Shane Patton on HBO's The White Lotus (2021 to present), and Deborah "DJ" Vance Jr. on Hacks (2021 to present) are Cornell University alumni. In films, Christina Pagniacci in Any Given Sunday (1999) and Natalie Keener in Up in the Air (2009) are Cornell alumni.

== See also ==
- List of Cornell University faculty
- List of Quill and Dagger members
- Notable alumni of the Sphinx Head Society
