= List of Quill and Dagger members =

Quill and Dagger is a senior society founded at Cornell University in 1893. A small number of honorary members have been selected since the society's founding, usually qualified individuals who were not eligible for membership as undergraduates, such as Janet Reno and Ruth Bader Ginsburg. Cornell Presidents Dale R. Corson, Frank H.T. Rhodes, Hunter R. Rawlings III, and Jeffrey Lehman all hold membership in the society as well.

Membership is published in The Cornell Daily Sun each semester. Other sources of membership lists include The New York Times during the 1920s and 1930s, The Cornell Alumni News from 1899 to 1961, and The Cornellian yearbook. This list contains notable members who were selected for Quill and Dagger as undergraduates. Class years are listed in parentheses.

== Academia ==
- John Cranford Adams (1926) – president of Hofstra University and Shakespeare scholar
- Rexford A. Boda (1955) – president of Nyack College and Canadian Bible College (now Ambrose University)
- Kimberlé Crenshaw (1981) – professor at the UCLA School of Law and Columbia Law School
- Roy Curtiss (1956) – professor of genomics, evolution, and bioinformatics at the University of Florida
- Arthur Starr Eakle (1892) – mineralogist and professor at University of California, Berkeley and the University of Hawaii
- Edward D. Eddy (1944) – president of University of Rhode Island, provost of Pennsylvania State University, and president of Chatham College
- Donald P. Greenberg (1955) – professor of Computer Graphics at Cornell University
- Glenn W. Herrick (1896) – professor of entomology at Cornell University
- Porter Raymond Lee (1903) – director of the New York School of Philanthropy
- Harold O. Levy (1974) – New York City School Chancellor and executive vice president and general counsel of Kaplan, Inc.
- Jay O. Light (1963) – dean of the Harvard Business School
- Robert Phillips Ludlum (1930) – president of Blackburn College and Anne Arundel Community College
- Charles H. Rammelkamp (1896) – president of Illinois College
- Clinton Rossiter (1939) – historian and political scientist at Cornell University
- LaRoy B. Thompson (1942) – senior vice president and treasurer of the University of Rochester; researcher with the Manhattan Project
- Robley C. Williams (1931) – professor of virology at the University of California, Berkeley

== Arts and architecture ==
- Thomas N. Armstrong III (1954) – director of the Pennsylvania Academy of the Fine Arts, Whitney Museum of American Art, and Andy Warhol Museum
- Earl Flansburgh (1953) – architect and educational design expert, who designed the Cornell Campus Store
- F. Ellis Jackson (1900) – architect of Cornell University's Myron Taylor Hall
- Eads Johnson (1899) – naval architect and marine engineer who designed ferryboats
- Ernest A. Van Vleck (1897) – architect with Starrett & van Vleck known for New York City skyscrapers and retail buildings, including Lord & Taylor (1914), Saks Fifth Avenue (1924), American Stock Exchange (1930), Bloomingdales (1930), and the Downtown Athletic Club (1930)

== Business ==
=== Banking and finance ===
- Stephen Friedman (1959) – chairman of Goldman Sachs (1990–1994); director of the National Economic Council (2002–2005); chairman of the U.S. President's Foreign Intelligence Advisory Board (2006–2009)
- Thomas W. Jones (1969) – chairman and CEO of Citigroup's Global Investment Management and president and COO of TIAA-CREF
- Nelson Schaenen (1923) – president of Smith Barney (1964–1967)
- Robert Selander (1972) – president and CEO of MasterCard (1997–2010)
- Stephen H. Weiss (1957) – co-founder and CEO of Weiss, Peck & Greer (1970–2001)

=== Consumer products ===
- Gene Case (1959) – advertising executive who developed campaigns for Mennen, Tums, Lyndon B. Johnson's 1964 presidential election, Nelson Rockefeller, and Robert F. Wagner
- Adolph Coors III (1937) – president of Adolph Coors Company (1958–1960); kidnapped and murdered by Joseph Corbett, Jr.
- Joseph Coors (1939) – founding member and financier of The Heritage Foundation; president of Adolph Coors Company (1977–1985)
- Edwin T. Gibson (1908) – vice president of General Foods; founding president of Birdseye Frosted Foods; acting U.S. Defense Production Administrator during the Korean War
- Charles L. Jarvie (1958) – President of Dr Pepper (1980–1982) and president of the Fidelity Marketing Company

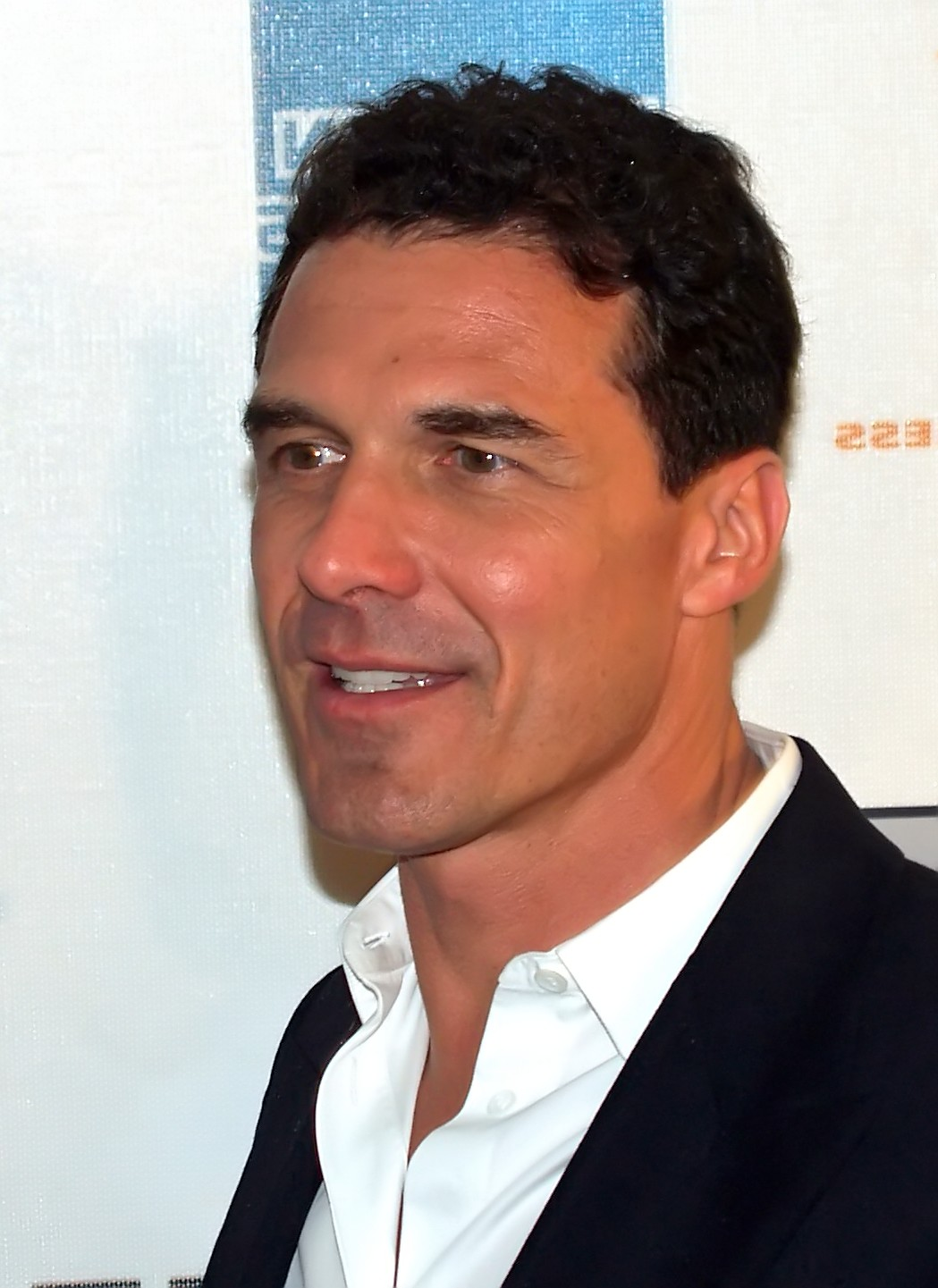
Andre Balazs

=== Hospitality ===
- Andre Balazs (1979) – hotelier and businessman; owner of ten hotels, including the Chateau Marmont
- George Charles Boldt Jr. (1905) – president of the Waldorf–Astoria Hotel Company
- Drew Nieporent (1977) – restaurateur; creator and owner of Myriad Restaurant Group, including Nobu and Montrachet

=== Manufacturing and oil ===
- John Lyon Collyer (1917) – president and chairman of B.F. Goodrich Company; director of rubber for War Production Board
- James J. Cosgrove (1909) – general counsel and chairman of Continental Oil
- Morse G. Dial (1919) – president, CEO, and Chairman of Union Carbide
- H. Laurance Fuller (1960) – president, CEO, and chairman of Amoco
- Birny Mason Jr. (1931) – president, CEO, and chairman of Union Carbide
- Joseph N. Pew Jr. (1908) – vice president and chairman of Sun Oil Company; co-founder of The Pew Charitable Trusts
- Jack Sheinkman (1949) – president of Amalgamated Clothing Workers of America; chairman of Americans for Democratic Action (1995–1998)
- Walter C. Teagle (1900) – president and chairman of Standard Oil

=== Technology ===
- Henry A. Klyce (1969) – entrepreneur; developer of orthopedic, neurosurgery, and spinal stenosis devices; founder and executive of multiple medical device companies
- Jules Kroll (1963) – founder of Kroll Inc. (2003)
- James C. Morgan (1960) – chairman of Applied Materials (1987–2009); 1996 National Medal of Technology recipient
- Jay Walker (1977) – founder of Priceline.com and Walker Digital
- John Zimmer (2006) – co-founder and COO of Lyft

=== Transportation and energy ===
- Cedric A. Major (1913) – president of the Lehigh Valley Railroad (1947–1961); ranked 11th tennis player nationally in the 1930s
- George P. McNear Jr. (1913) – president of the Toledo, Peoria and Western Railway (1925–1947)
- Paul A. Schoellkopf (1906) – president and chairman of Niagara Falls Power Company

== Entertainment ==
- Bruce Boyce (1933) – operatic baritone who performed with contemporaries Kathleen Ferrier and Suzanne Danco; Royal Academy of Music professor
- Charles Divine (1911) – Broadway playwright; film writer
- Jay Fassett (1911) – Broadway and film actor; played Doc Gibbs in the original production of Our Town
- Jay Harris (1960) – Tony Award-winning Broadway producer of Side Man, Dirty Rotten Scoundrels, and Never Gonna Dance
- Lon Hoyt (1979) – musical director and conductor of Broadway's The Rocky Horror Show and Tony Award-winning musical Hairspray
- Milt Kogan (1957) – television and film actor best known for playing Officer Kogan on Barney Miller
- Stuart Loory (1954) – executive producer and vice-president of CNN; editor-in-chief of CNN World Report (1990–1991); managing editor of Chicago Sun-Times
- Howard A. Rodman (1971) – president of the Writers Guild of America, West; screenwriter of August, Savage Grace, and Joe Gould's Secret
- Jeremy Schaap (1991) – Emmy Award-winning sportswriter and broadcaster

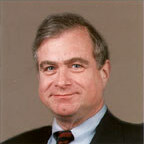
Sandy Berger

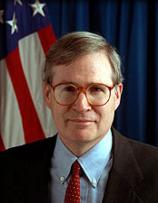
Stephen Hadley

== Government ==
- Sandy Berger (1967) – United States National Security Advisor (1997–2001); Council on Foreign Relations
- Stephen Hadley (1969) – National Security Advisor (2005–2009)
- Stephen D. Krasner (1963) – United States Director of Policy Planning (2005–2009); Council on Foreign Relations
- Gerald Klerman (1950) - head of the Alcohol, Drug Abuse and Mental Health Administration (1977–1980)
- Philip Merrill (1955) – head of the Export-Import Bank of the United States (2002–2005)

== Law ==
- Robert Boochever (1939) – Senior Circuit Judge of United States Court of Appeals for the Ninth Circuit (1986–2011)
- Zachary W. Carter (1972) – corporation counsel of New York City (2014–2019); U.S. Attorney for the Eastern District of New York (1993–1999)
- Harry T. Edwards (1962) – United States Court of Appeals for the District of Columbia Circuit Chief Judge (1994–2001); chairman of Amtrak (1978–1980)
- Mario Lazo (1915) – lawyer; expert on American policy in Cuban; fought for freedom of the Cuban press; author of Dagger in the Heart: American Policy Failures in Cuba
- L. Londell McMillan (1987) – entertainment attorney and leading artists' rights advocate; legal representative for Michael Jackson, Spike Lee, Lil' Kim, Prince, Usher, Kanye West, and Stevie Wonder; co-owner of New Jersey Nets; legal affairs manager for Michael Jackson
- Dutch Schirick (1914) – New York Supreme Court justice and MLB American League St. Louis Browns
- Leah Ward Sears (1976) – Chief Justice (2005–2009) and justice (1992–2005) of the Supreme Court of Georgia; first woman and African-American on the Supreme Court of Georgia

== Literature and journalism ==
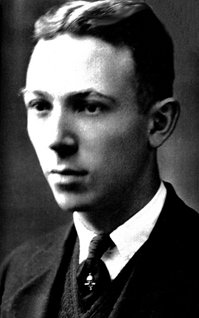
E. B. White

=== Pulitzer Prize winners ===
- Jay Branegan (1972) – 1976 Pulitzer Prize-winning journalist with The Chicago Tribune
- John Hassell (1991) – 2005 Pulitzer Prize-winning journalist with The Star-Ledger
- Marc Lacey (1987) – 1993 Pulitzer Prize-winning journalist with The Los Angeles Times; The New York Times managing editor
- Kenneth Roberts (1908) – 1957 Pulitzer Prize special award and citation for historical novels; author of Northwest Passage
- E. B. White (1921) – 1978 Pulitzer Prize special award and citation for letters, essays, and other works; author of Charlotte's Web, Stuart Little, and The Elements of Style

=== Other ===
- Ken Blanchard (1961) – author and business consultant
- F. Dana Burnet (1911) – poet, short story author, and Broadway playwright
- Steven A. Carter (1978) – author who coined the term "commitmentphobia", whose book is featured in the films When Harry Met Sally... and The Mexican
- Gordon G. Chang (1973) – author on international policy, specifically regarding China, Korea, and nuclear proliferation
- Maximilian Elser Jr. (1910) – founded the Metropolitan Newspaper Service
- Joey Green (1980) – the "Pantry Professor;" author of books including The Bubble Wrap Book, Marx & Lennon, and Clean It! Fix It! Eat It!; Clio Award winner
- Scott Jaschik (1985) – founding editor of Inside Higher Ed; editor of The Chronicle of Higher Education (1999–2003)
- Austin H. Kiplinger (1939) – editor and executive of the Kiplinger publishing empire
- Knight Kiplinger (1969) – editor and executive of the Kiplinger publishing empire
- Gus Lobrano (1924) – managing editor of The New Yorker (1941–1956)
- Earl W. Mayo (1894) – founder and editor of Sugar and World Petroleum magazines
- George Jean Nathan (1904) – drama critic; founder of American Spectator and The American Mercury
- Sam Roberts (1968) – deputy editor of The New York Times Week in Review (1995–2015); columnist, reporter, and editor with The New York Times and New York Daily News; biographer of David Greenglass and Nelson Rockefeller
- Diana Skelton (1986) - author of books including Until the Sky Turns Silver,
- Tyrone D. Taborn (1981) – CEO of Career Communications Group; editor-in-chief and publisher of US Black Engineer & Information Technology
- Hugh Troy (1926) – children's book author

== Politics ==
=== U.S. Congress ===
- Hansen Clarke (1984) – U.S. House of Representatives, Michigan House of Representatives, and Michigan Senate
- Maurice Connolly (1897) – U.S. House of Representative
- Barber Conable (1943) – U.S. House of Representative and World Bank President
- Norman J. Gould (1899) – U.S. House of Representative
- Lewis Henry (1909) – U.S. House of Representative
- Alexander Pirnie (1927) – U.S. House of Representative
- Daniel A. Reed (1898) – U.S. House of Representative
- Elmer E. Studley (1892) – U.S. House of Representative

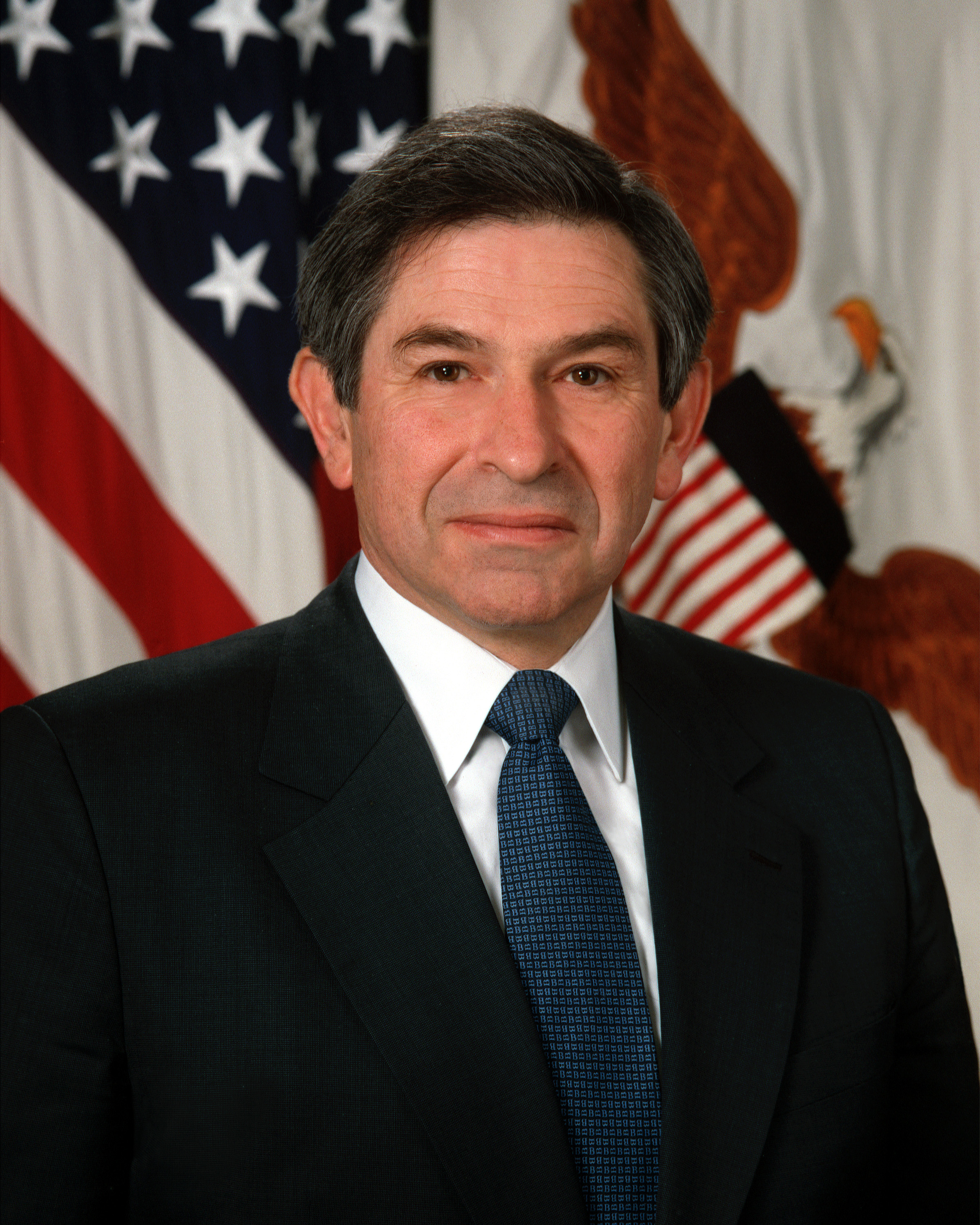
Paul Wolfowitz

=== Canada Parliament ===
- Ken Dryden (1969) – Parliament of Canada (2004–2011); Canadian Minister of Social Development (2004–2006); NHL Montreal Canadiens goalie (1970–1979); six-time Stanley Cup winner

=== U.S. cabinet ===
- Roger W. Jones (1928) – Deputy Secretary of State (1961–1962); chairman of the Civil Service Commission (1959–1961); adviser to five U.S. presidents
- Paul Wolfowitz (1965) – United States Deputy Secretary of Defense (2001–2005); World Bank President (2005–2007); United States Director of Policy Planning (1981–1982)

=== Diplomats ===
- Makila James (1979) – U.S. Ambassador to Swaziland (2012–2016)

=== State politics ===
- Morris S. Halliday (1906) – New York State Senate (1915–1918)
- Joseph H. Holland (1978) – New York State Commissioner of Housing & Community Renewal
- Sam MacNeil (1951) – New York State Assembly member (1979–1988); Cornell Big Red men's basketball team coach (1959–1968)
- John F. Murtaugh (1898) – acting Lieutenant Governor of New York (1914); Majority Leader of the New York State Senate (1914); New York State Senate (1911–1914)
- Daniel B. Strickler (1922) – Lieutenant Governor of Pennsylvania (1947–1951)

=== Local politics ===
- Svante Myrick (2009) – mayor of Ithaca, New York (2012–2022)

Paxus Calta

=== Political activists ===
- Paxus Calta (1979) – anti-nuclear power and clean energy activist

== Science and engineering ==
- Elias Judah Durand (1893) – mycologist and botanist; foremost expert on discomycetes
- Thomas Hall (1893) – inventor of the four-valve steam engines
- Thomas J. Kelly (1951) – chief engineer of the Apollo Lunar Module; NASA Director of Space Programs (1972–1976)

== Sports ==
=== Administration ===
- James Lynah (1905) – principal founder of the Eastern Intercollegiate Athletic Conference (now the ECAC); Cornell University Director of Athletics (1935–1944)
- Carl F. Ullrich (1950) – first executive director of the Patriot League; first civilian director of athletics at the United States Military Academy (1980–1990)

=== Baseball ===
- Edmund "Stubby" Magner (1911) – MLB American League New York Highlanders (1911)
- Dutch Schirick (1914) – MLB American League St. Louis Browns and a New York Supreme Court justice

=== Football ===
- Kevin Boothe (2006) – NFL Oakland Raiders (2006, 2014) and New York Giants (2007–2013); Super Bowl XLII champion; Super Bowl XLVI champion
- Al Dekdebrun (1947) – AAFC Buffalo Bisons (1946), Chicago Rockets (1947); NFL Boston Yanks (1948); CFL Toronto Argonauts (1950–1951)
- Hal Ebersole (1923) – NFL Cleveland Indians (1923)
- Fred Gillies (1918) – APFA and NFL Chicago Cardinals (1920–1926, 1928)
- Derrick Harmon (1984) – NFL San Francisco 49ers (1984–1986); Super Bowl XIX champion
- Sanford Hunt (1904) – All-American football player
- Reno Jones (1923) – NFL Toledo Maroons (1922)
- Bob Lally (1974) – NFL Green Bay Packers (1976)
- Charles A. Lueder (1903) – head football coach at Virginia Tech (1903) and West Virginia University (1908–1911)
- Harold F. McCullough (1941) – NFL Brooklyn Dodgers (1942)
- William Newman (1907) – 1906 College Football All-America Team; Georgetown Hoyas head football coach (1909); Intercollegiate Rowing Association champion
- Henry Schoellkopf (1902) – Cornell University head football coach (1907–1908); namesake of Schoellkopf Memorial Hall
- Fritz Shiverick (1918) – All-American football quarterback on the undefeated national champion 1915 Cornell team
- Ken Talton (1979) – NFL Kansas City Chiefs (1980) and USFL Birmingham Stallions (1983–1984)

=== Hockey ===
- Stephen Baby (2003) – NHL Atlanta Thrashers organization (2003–2007)
- Byron Bitz (2007) – NHL Boston Bruins organization (2007–2010); Florida Panthers organization (2010–2011); Vancouver Canucks organization (2011–2012)
- Ken Dryden (1969) – NHL Montreal Canadiens goalie (1970–1979); six-time Stanley Cup winner; Canadian Minister of Social Development (2004–2006); member of the Parliament of Canada (2004–2011)
- Larry Fullan (1972) – NHL Washington Capitals (1974–1975)
- Colin Greening (2010) – NHL Ottawa Senators organization (2010–2016); Toronto Maple Leafs organization (2016–2019)
- Matt Moulson (2006) – NHL Los Angeles Kings (2006–2008); New York Islanders (2009–2013); Buffalo Sabres (2013–2018)
- Ben Scrivens (2010) – NHL Maple Leafs organization (2010–2013); Los Angeles Kings organization (2013); Edmonton Oilers organization (2013–2015); Montreal Canadiens organization (2016); 2018 Winter Olympics bronze medalist

=== Lacrosse ===
- Bruce L. Cohen (1965) – gold medal with U.S. national team in World Lacrosse Championship (1974); National Lacrosse Hall of Fame
- Butch Hilliard (1968) – Ensign C. Markland Kelly, Jr. Award (1967, 1968); National Lacrosse Hall of Fame
- Daniel R. Mackesey (1977) – NCAA Lacrosse Championship team (1976, 1977); silver medal with U.S. national team in World Lacrosse Championship (1978); National Lacrosse Hall of Fame

=== Rowing ===
- Kenneth C. Brown (1974) – three-time member of U.S. National Rowing team; gold medal at World Rowing Championships (1974)
- Clayton W. Chapman (1957) – 1957 Henley Royal Regatta Grand Challenge Cup winner; ECAC Commissioner and Regatta Director; namesake of U.S. Rowing Administrator Award and ECAC Most Improved trophy; National Rowing Hall of Fame
- Donald Spero (1961) – World Rowing Single Sculls Champion (1966); U.S. National Champion in Single Sculls (1963, 1964, 1966), Double Sculls (1963), and Quadruple Sculls (1965); sixth place in 1964 Summer Olympics; co-founder of National Rowing Foundation

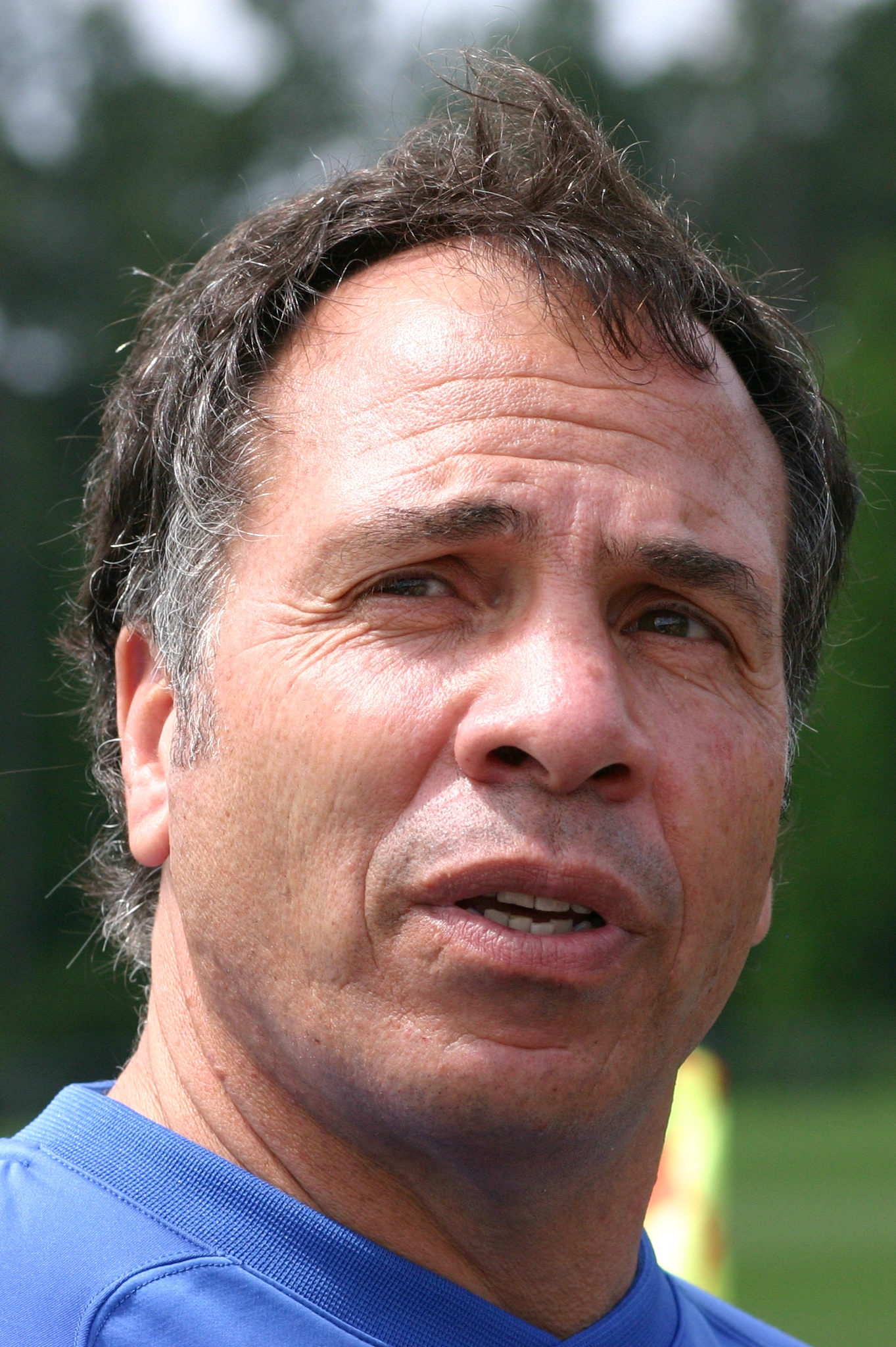
Bruce Arena

=== Soccer ===
- Bruce Arena (1973) – coach of the United States men's national soccer team (1998–2006, 2016–2017); Major League Soccer coach of D.C. United (1996–1998), New York Red Bulls (2006–2007), and Los Angeles Galaxy (2008–2016); National Soccer Hall of Fame
- Ron Maierhofer (1960) – U.S. National Soccer team (1959–1960); 1960 Summer Olympics soccer team; owner of the Denver Avalanche

=== Tennis ===
- Francis Hunter (1916) – 1924 Summer Olympics gold medalist in tennis (doubles); International Tennis Hall of Fame

=== Track and field ===
- John Anderson (1929) – 1932 Summer Olympics gold medalist in track and field (discus throw)
- Lesley Ashburner (1906) – 1904 Summer Olympics bronze medalist in track and field (110 m. hurdles)
- Frank Foss (1917) – 1920 Summer Olympics gold medalist in track and field (pole vault); world record for pole vault (1919–1922)
- Meredith Gourdine (1952) – 1952 Summer Olympics silver medalist in track and field (long jump)
- Albert W. Hall (1956) – four-time Summer Olympics hammer throw participant (1956, 1960, 1964, 1968)
- John Paul Jones (1913) – world record for one mile run (1911–1915); 1912 Summer Olympics participant; set first mile record to be ratified by the International Association of Athletics Federations (IAAF) (1913)
- Charles H. Moore (1951) – 1952 Summer Olympics gold medalist in track and field (400 m. hurdles) and silver medalist in track and field (4 × 100 m. relay)
- Alma Richards (1917) – 1912 Summer Olympics gold medalist in track and field (high jump)
- Herbert Trube (1908) – 1908 Summer Olympics silver medalist in track and field (3-mile team)
- Rudy Winkler (2017) – 2016 U.S. Olympic Trials hammer throw champion; 2016 Summer Olympics, 2020 Summer Olympics, and 2024 Summer Olympics hammer throw participant

=== Wrestling ===
- David Auble (1960) – two-time NCAA Wrestling Champion (1959, 1960); two-time All-American (1959, 1960); 1964 Summer Olympics wrestling team
- Frank A. Bettucci (1953) – NCAA Wrestling Champion (1953); All-American (1953); National Wrestling Hall of Fame
- Kyle Dake (2013) – four-time NCAA Wrestling Champion (2010, 2011, 2012, 2013); only wrestler to ever win four NCAA titles in four different weight classes; 2020 Summer Olympics and 2024 Summer Olympics bronze medalist
- Glenn D. Stafford (1929) – professional wrestler, NCAA Wrestling Champion (1929), All-American (1929)
