= Justin Bogle =

American chef

- Born: March 23, 1981 (age 45)
- Education: The Restaurant School at Walnut Hill College
- Culinary career
- Cooking style: Modern American
- Rating
- Michelin stars
- Current restaurant
- Gilt (2006 - 2012)
- Previous restaurants
- The Striped Bass; Alma de Cuba
- Website: giltnewyork.com/nyc-restaurant-chef-bogle.php

Justin Bogle is an American Chef. He was the executive chef at Gilt restaurant in New York. In 2009, Bogle became the youngest American chef, at age 28, to earn two Michelin stars. Bogle has been described as a quiet, but equally talented version of chef Paul Liebrandt of Corton.

== Career ==
Bogle received his culinary education at the Restaurant School at Walnut Hill College in Philadelphia, graduating in 2002. He went to work for chefs Jose Garces and Douglas Rodriquez at Alma de Cuba. In 2004, after a backpack trip through Spain, Bogle continues his training at the Striped Bass restaurant in Philadelphia under the tutelage of chef Christopher Lee, who later became executive chef at Gilt after Paul Liebrandt's departure in 2006.

=== Gilt ===
Bogle was executive chef at Gilt in The New York Palace Hotel in Midtown Manhattan. In 2006, Bogle started as a sous chef under executive chef Christopher Lee.

Bogle's inventive menu at Gilt included such dishes as sashimi-style scallops with rhubarb, buckwheat, horseradish snow, salted cucumber and lavender; rib-eye blue cheese, heirloom tomatoes, bordelaise; and foie gras with pancetta spice, candied black olive, kumquat mostarda, fennel and pine nuts. Gilt received Michelin's two-star rating in 2009, 2010 and 2011 under Bogle's culinary leadership, but closed in December 2012.

=== Le Coucou ===
Bogle has served as the Chef de Cuisine of Le Coucou, a Michelin-starred restaurant, in New York City, since 2016.

=== Manhatta ===
In 2022, Bogle was brought on to helm the culinary program as Executive Chef at Union Square Hospitality Group's Manhatta.

== See also ==
- Molecular gastronomy
