= A Matter of Taste =

- Directed by: Sally Rowe
- Starring: Paul Liebrandt, Thomas Keller, Heston Blumenthal, Grant Achatz, Eric Ripert, Frank Bruni
- Theme music composer: John M Davis
- Country of origin: United States
- Original language: English

Production
- Producers: Sally Rowe, Alan Oxman, Rachel Mills
- Editor: Amy Foote

Original release
- Network: HBO
- Release: June 13, 2011

A Matter of Taste: Serving Up Paul Liebrandt is a documentary that follows the career of chef Paul Liebrandt over the course of a decade in New York City. Directed by Sally Rowe, it premiered on HBO on June 13, 2011.

== Synopsis ==
The film follows the career of Paul Liebrandt as a British chef in post-9/11 New York City. In 2002, at Papillon, he is serving sophisticated cuisine which is out of place with the restaurant's decor, which is described by former New York Times critic William Grimes as "a dump". Grimes still awarded the restaurant two stars and called Liebrandt "enormously talented". The owners of Papillon decide that they will make more money as a neighborhood restaurant, serving bistro fare. Liebrandt is shown three months later, plating hamburgers and pretending to fall asleep. He complains that preparing the bistro food is making him brain dead, and he tries to entertain himself by arranging French fry tastings. He decides to leave the restaurant, and the owners wish him well.

Without a restaurant, Liebrandt turns to food consulting. He creates his own company and takes on jobs like designing gourmet marshmallows. Eventually, he returns to a restaurant with the launch of Gilt at the New York Palace Hotel. His hopes are high for a prolonged return to the kitchen, but the Times has a new restaurant critic, Frank Bruni, who prefers comfort food to high cuisine. Bruni appears on camera to describe the star system which is used in Times reviews. Bruni only bestows two stars on Gilt, citing the empty virtuosity of the dishes. At the same time, the owners of Gilt had begun to make menu demands on Liebrandt, such as larger portions. Shortly after Bruni's review, Liebrandt is fired.

The chef returns to consulting, and he is seen designing cocktails like a vodka tonic encapsulated in flavorless gum like El Bulli's liquid olive. His hiatus from the kitchen is ended by Drew Nieporent, the successful restaurateur behind Nobu. Nieporent wants to remake his first restaurant, Montrachet, in Tribeca. He hires Liebrandt on the basis of verbal recommendations from other people in the industry. The restaurant is renamed Corton, and the final section of the film shows the relentless demands of preparing for the opening.

Liebrandt claims he is working 20-hour days, while his staff works 18. He is shown overseeing the menu development, the training of the kitchen staff, the architectural plans, and even the lighting. While demanding and precise, he also remains upbeat and calm. Even when he threatens to drive the heads of two cooks through a wall if they ever mess up a dish again, he never appears completely unhinged. He states that his only goal for the restaurant is one Michelin star in its first year.

In the run up to the opening, the film edits together more and more of Liebrandt's comments about Bruni, turning him into a de facto antagonist. As the chef prepares his dishes, he jokes that they will "go over Bruni's head". When he is reviewing the menu, with dishes like White Onion Consommé, he asks his marketing director if it is full of dishes that only foodies will want to order. She believes that it is, but she encourages Liebrandt by suggesting that the culinary spectrum in New York had veered so far towards Bruni's beloved comfort food, that Corton will be a welcome difference.

When the restaurant opens, it receives rave reviews across the board. The staff eagerly await Bruni's arrival and easily see through the aliases he uses for his reservations. He makes three visits to the restaurant, and the staff describe his demeanor and relay some of the tricks he employs, such as dropping a towel on the floor of the restroom at the beginning of his meal. At the end of the meal, he returns to see if it has been picked up. Bruni emails to fact check his review, and he has thirteen questions about the menu. Liebrandt sees this as an ominous sign.

However, Bruni's review is glowing. He says on camera that he felt Liebrandt's cuisine had matured to a point where he could restrain his excessive impulses and just deliver sophisticated dishes that did not try to impress the diner. He bestows three stars on Corton, and the staff goes out to celebrate. A closing title card reveals that the restaurant went on to receive two Michelin stars.

== History ==
Sally Rowe, a script supervisor for The Chappelle Show, ate at Atlas in 2000, when Paul Liebrandt was the chef. She was enamored with the food that she ate and befriended Liebrandt. Originally, she shot several chefs at work, but only Liebrandt's cuisine popped onscreen. Another advantage was his youth, which allowed her to follow the development of his career.

The film was edited as a class project of The Edit Center. The film was screened at SXSW Film Festival, Full Frame, Newport Beach Film Festival and Tribeca Film Festival.
