= Bâtard (restaurant) =

French restaurant in New York City

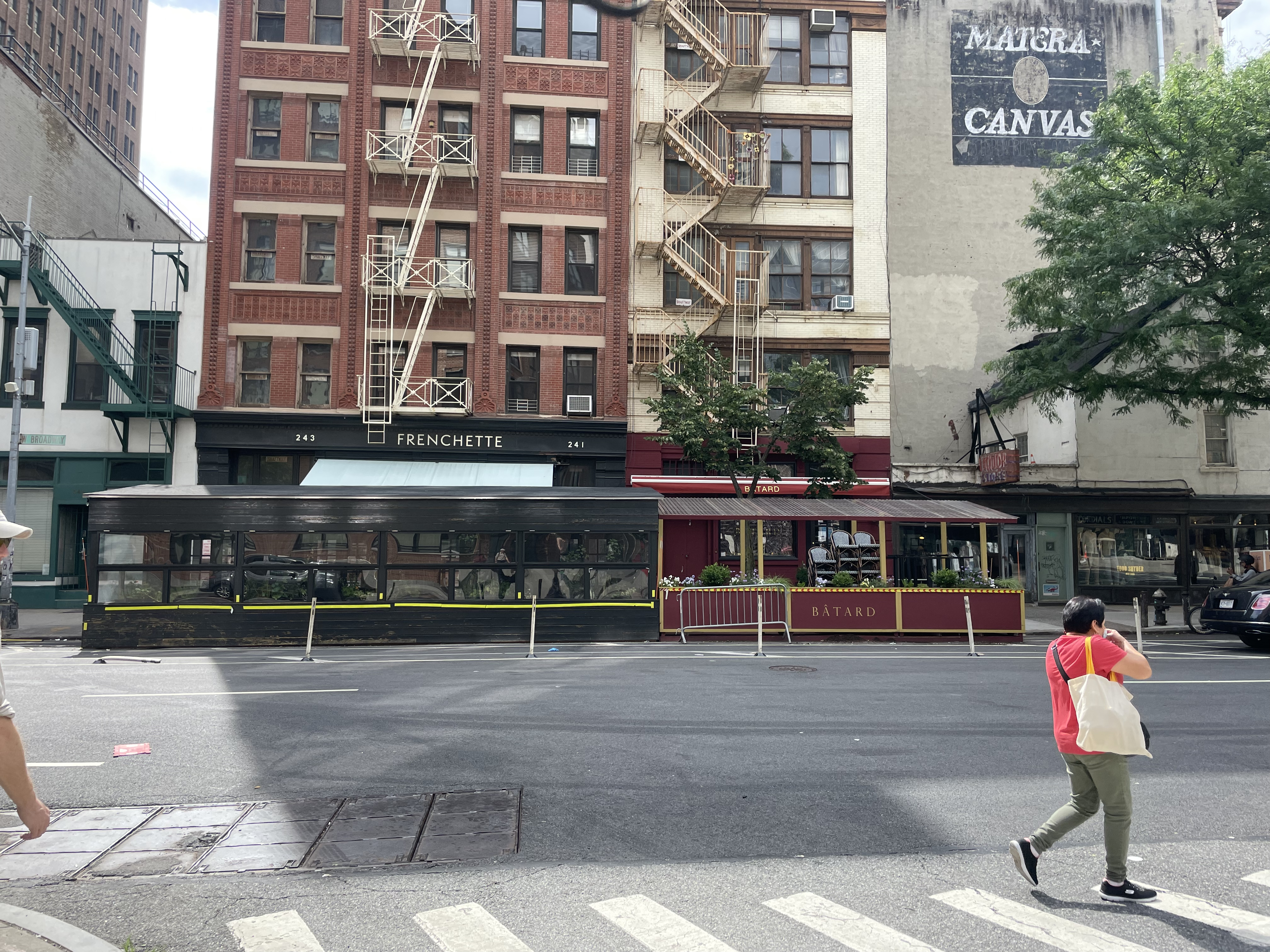
- Bâtard (right)
- Interactive map of Bâtard

Restaurant information
- Established: 2014
- Closed: 2023
- Owner: Drew Nieporent
- Head chef: Doug Brixton
- Rating: Michelin Guide
- Location: 239 West Broadway, Manhattan, New York City, New York, 10013
- Coordinates: 40°43′10.5″N 74°0′21″W
- Website: www.batardtribeca.com

Bâtard was a French restaurant in New York City. The restaurant opened in 2014, replacing French restaurant Corton. In May 2023, it was announced Bâtard would close on May 20, 2023.

== History ==
The space occupied by Bâtard was formerly home to the restaurants Montrachet and Corton. Drew Nieporent operated both before founding Bâtard. Corton closed in 2013 after its chef, Paul Liebrandt, departed to work at another restaurant. Like Montrachet and Corton, he restaurant's name refers to a grand cru vineyard, in this case Bâtard-Montrachet. The word also means "bastard" in French.

After the closure of Corton, Nieporent considered several proposals for the space before receiving one from chef Markus Glocker and John Winterman. In an effort not to compete with the legacy of Corton, which was formal, Bâtard aims to serve "approachable" food. Bâtard opened in 2014, garnering comparisons to Montrachet. Glocker, the head chef, began splitting his time between Bâtard and the restaurant Augustine in 2018. The restaurant closed temporarily twice during the COVID-19 pandemic.

In May 2023, Eater reported the restaurant would close. A new restaurant, Eulalie run by husband and wife Chip Smith and Tina Vaughn, will replace Bâtard.

== Reviews and accolades ==
=== Reviews ===
The restaurant received three stars from New York Times reviewer Pete Wells. Other critics have commented favorably on Bâtard's affordability.

=== Accolades ===
The restaurant earned a Michelin star for the first time in 2014, and retained that rating each year until its closure. At the 2015 James Beard Foundation gala, Bâtard was voted 2014's best new restaurant.

== See also ==
- List of Michelin-starred restaurants in New York City
