= Ralph Hospital =

United States Army general

- Born: January 27, 1891; Washington, D.C.
- Died: December 20, 1972 (aged 81)
- Burial place: Arlington National Cemetery, Virginia, U.S.
- Alma mater: George Washington University
- Spouses: Marjorie Lilian Craig (m. 1914; div. 1926); Louise Tarbell (m. 1929)
- Children: 3
- Relatives: Earl Flansburgh (son-in-law); John Flansburgh (grandson); Paxus Calta (grandson)
- Military career
- Allegiance: United States
- Branch: United States Army
- Service years: 1913–1951
- Rank: Brigadier General
- Service number: 03625
- Unit: Field Artillery Branch
- Commands: 1st Battalion, 84th Field Artillery Regiment; 1st Battalion, 3rd Field Artillery Regiment; 75th Field Artillery Brigade
- Conflicts: World War I World War II
- Awards: Silver Star
- Other work: Cornell University faculty

Ralph Hospital (January 27, 1891 – December 20, 1972) was an American career military officer who served during World War I and World War II and attained the rank of brigadier general.

== Military career ==
Hospital graduated from George Washington University in 1913. He was commissioned in the United States Army in November 1913 as a field artillery officer and saw service with the 15th Cavalry Regiment during the Mexican Campaign in Douglas, Arizona, and Sierra Blanca, Texas. He served as an artillery officer in France during World War I and then took an instructor role at Cornell University in Ithaca, New York, until the mid-1920s.

Hospital, at the rank of major, served with the 15th Field Artillery Regiment during its period under the Hawaiian Division in 1925, and returned to the United States in 1926 to attend Command and General Staff College at Fort Leavenworth, Kansas. He was a distinguished graduate and soon returned to Ithaca to instruct Reserve Officers' Training Corps (ROTC) again. He attained the rank of lieutenant colonel in 1935.

Hospital was promoted to colonel in 1941 and saw service in World War II, first as commander of the 75th Field Artillery Brigade and then was frocked to brigadier general and placed as commanding general of the 91st Division Artillery. In the spring of 1944, they sailed for North Africa and then Italy, making the push for the Po River Valley and the Gothic Line. Hospital was awarded the Silver Star for his heroism in the Italian campaigns. He retired in January 1951, and was promoted to brigadier general on the U.S. Army Retired List in February 1951. He returned to Cornell as Professor of Military Studies and Tactics until the mid-1960s.

=== Awards ===
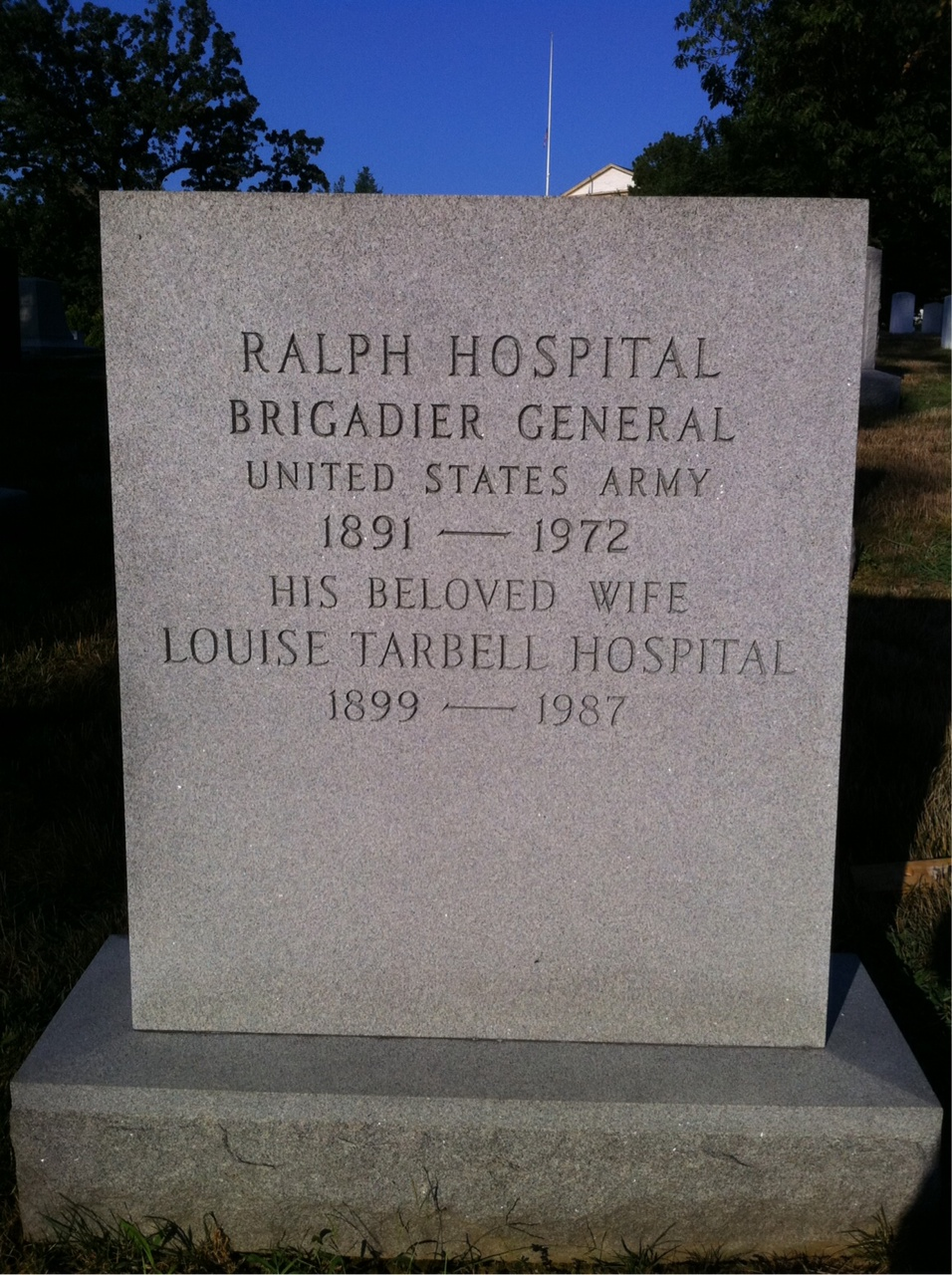
Grave at Arlington National Cemetery

Hospital's awards include the Silver Star, Legion of Merit, Bronze Star Medal, Army Commendation Medal, and the Italian Medal for Military Valor.

His campaign awards include the Mexican Campaign, World War I Victory, American Defense, American Campaign, European-Middle Eastern-North Africa Campaign Medal with three bronze campaign stars, the Army of Occupation Service Medal, and the World War II Victory Medal.

== Personal life ==
Hospital was married twice, and had three daughters. He was the father of Polly Flansburgh, owner of Boston by Foot, and was father-in-law to Earl Flansburgh, a notable Boston architect.

Hospital died on December 20, 1972, and was buried at Arlington National Cemetery.

Hospital is the maternal grandfather of musician John Flansburgh, co-founder of American alternative rock band They Might Be Giants, and Paxus Calta (born Earl S. Flansburgh), an anti-nuclear activist. They Might Be Giants included a picture of Hospital on the cover art for their 1988 album Lincoln.
