= Tribeca Grill =

Coordinates: 40°43′10″N 74°00′36″W

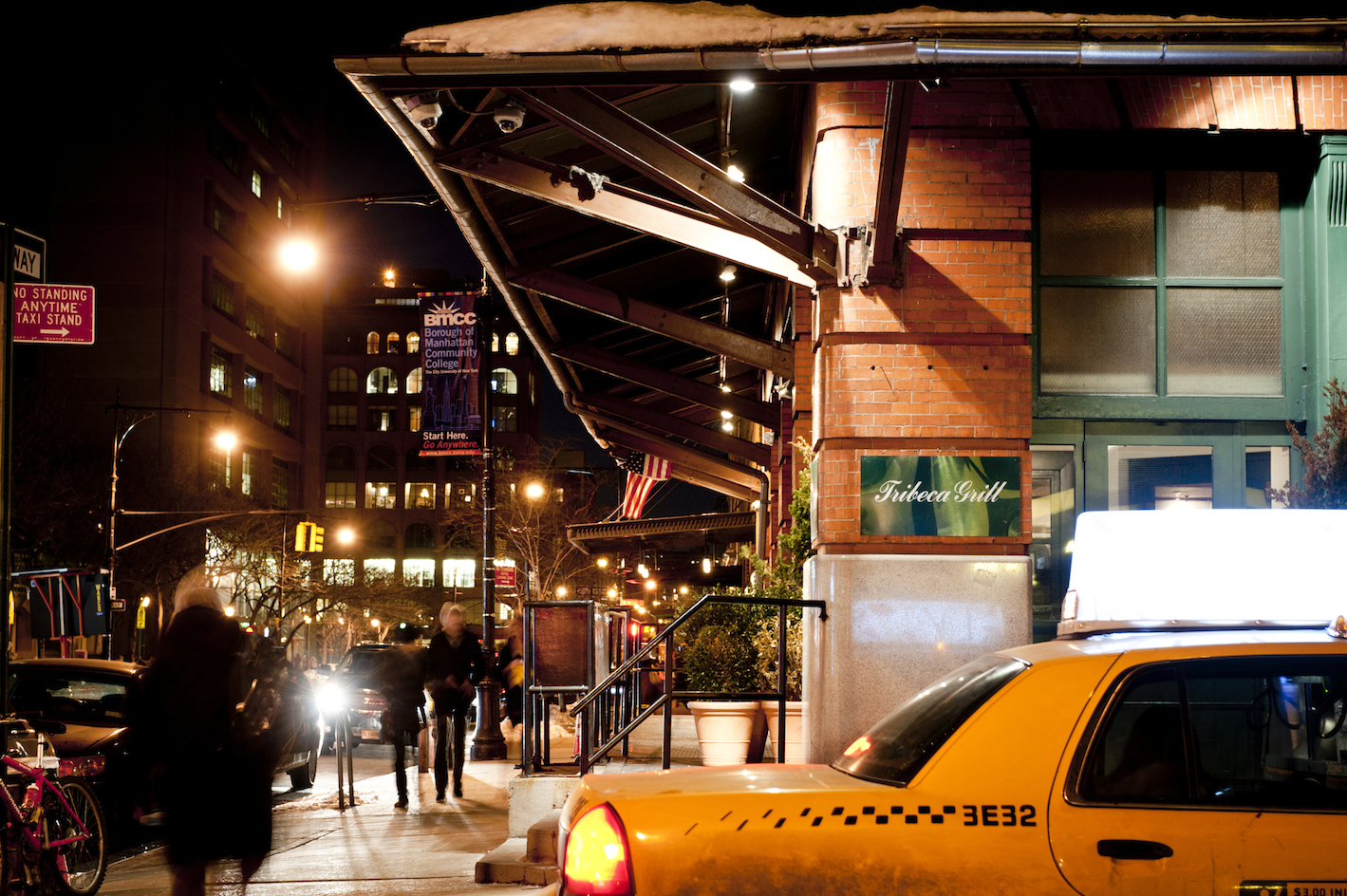
- Tribeca Grill in 2011
- Interactive map of Tribeca Grill

Restaurant information
- Established: 1990
- Owners: Robert De Niro, Drew Nieporent, among others
- Head chef: Stephane Motir
- Food type: New American
- Location: 375 Greenwich Street (at Franklin Street), New York City, New York, New York, 10013

Tribeca Grill was a New American restaurant at 375 Greenwich Street (at Franklin Street) in Tribeca, Manhattan, New York City, co-owned by Robert De Niro and Drew Nieporent. Celebrity investors include Bill Murray, Sean Penn, Christopher Walken, Ed Harris, and Lou Diamond Phillips, among others. It opened in 1990. The Executive Chef is Stephane Motir. The large mahogany bar in the center of the restaurant is from the former Maxwell's Plum restaurant. The restaurant closed in 2025 after 35 years in business.

== History ==
Restaurateur Drew Nieporent had opened a restaurant in Tribeca in 1985 called Montrachet, naming it after the Burgundy wine region. The actor Robert De Niro, who was a regular customer at Montrachet, is quoted as saying "I always thought of having a restaurant — a place where people could meet and talk. Drew had Montrachet a few blocks away, and I said, well, let me ask Drew if he wants to do it."

== Restaurant ==
The restaurant was designed by architect Lo-Yi Chan. It is housed in the building that was once the home of Martinson Coffee, and now houses the Tribeca Film Center. It is a central gathering place during the annual Tribeca Film Festival. Large paintings on the wall are original paintings by Robert De Niro Sr. A 2000 interior renovation included the addition of large lighting fixtures by the architect David Rockwell.

== Menu ==
The à la carte menu at Tribeca Grill changes on a seasonal basis, and on the basis of available ingredients. Some menu items have remained on the menu since the restaurant opened in 1990.

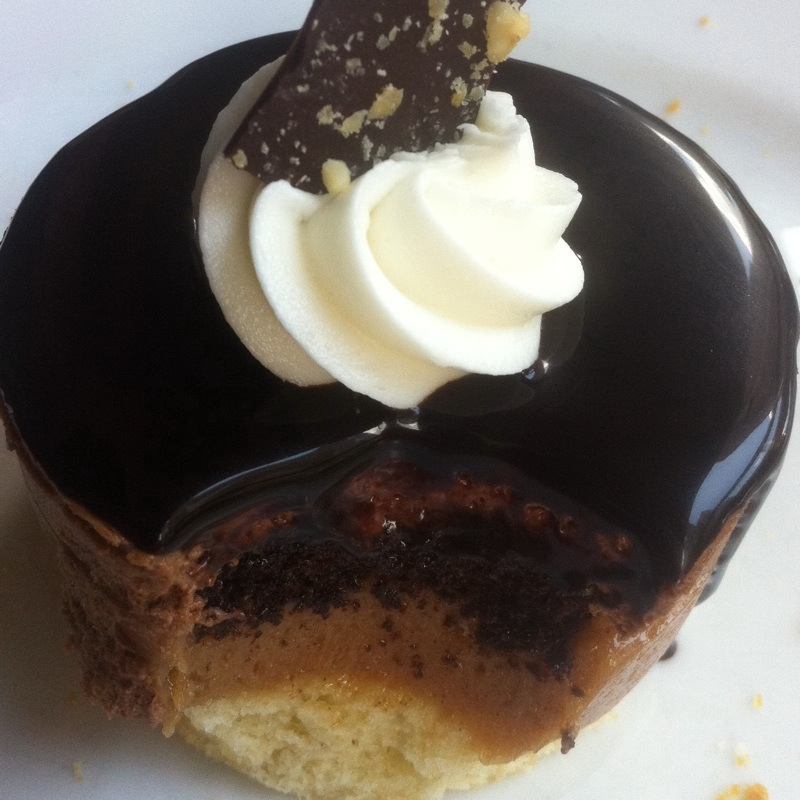
A chocolate cake with peanut butter mousse served at Tribeca Grill

== Reviews, Awards and Accolades ==
Since 2002, Tribeca Grill has been a recipient of the Wine Spectator Grand Award.

In 2013, Zagats gave Tribeca Grill a food rating of 23.

== See also ==
- List of New American restaurants
