= Eulalie (restaurant) =

- Eulalie after dinner service in 2026
- Interactive map of Eulalie

Restaurant information
- Established: 2023
- Owners: Chip Smith and Tina Vaughn
- Manager: Tina Vaughn
- Head chef: Chip Smith
- Food type: French, American
- Rating: 3 stars (The New York Times)
- Location: 239 West Broadway, Manhattan, New York City, New York, 10013
- Coordinates: 40.7196°N 74.0058°W
- Seating capacity: 40
- Reservations: Yes, by phone only
- Website: chipandtina.com

Eulalie is a French restaurant in the Tribeca neighborhood of New York City in the US, operated by chef Chip Smith and his partner Tina Vaughn.

== Reception ==
Eulalie (pronounced by Vaughn as ooo-LAH-lee) opened in 2023 and was included in the New York Times "100 best restaurants in New York" list in its first year. Pete Wells in the New York Times awarded them three stars.

The restaurant has 40 seats. Meals begin with an amuse-bouche and a small pour of wine before guests receive the prix-fixe menu. Smith also makes the desserts.

Eulalie has a minimal online presence; they aren't listed on any dining apps or social media sites. The restaurant takes reservations only by telephone, the menus and business cards are handwritten by Vaughn, and the Michelin Guide describes the restaurant as "warm and welcoming".

== History ==
Eulalie occupies the first floor at 239 West Broadway, a space previously occupied by the New York restaurants Bâtard, Montrachet, and Croton.

Chef Chip Smith trained with Jean-Louis Palladin early in his career, and Tina Vaughn was a Rockette and commercial actress before moving into hospitality. Eulalie is named for a vineyard in the south of France, but shares a name with an Edgar Allen Poe poem.

Smith and Vaughn were previously partners running the Upper East Side restaurant The Simone, with Robert Margolis, which shuttered in 2022. The Simone also received a 3-star rating from the New York Times, which rated the food highly and described the atmosphere and sound level as "deeply civilized."

Smith & Vaughn's first restaurant together was in Kitty Hawk, North Carolina, and their experience of Southern cuisine are reflected in their French fine dining menu at Eulalie.
