= Christopher Lee (chef) =

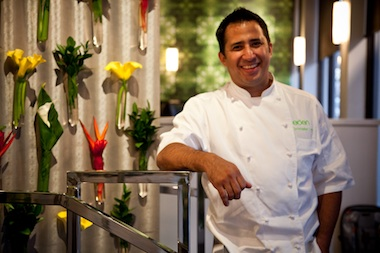
Chef Christopher Lee

Christopher Lee is a chef who specializes in New American cuisine.

== Career ==
Lee received his culinary education from the California Culinary Academy and later went on to work at many restaurants in New York City and San Francisco, such as Daniel, under Chef Daniel Boulud, Jean Georges, and The Fifth Floor.

Chef Lee's career took off when he accepted the sous chef position at seafood restaurant Oceana in New York, under chef Cornelius Gallagher. The restaurant received glowing reviews from The New York Times and The New York Post. Afterward, Chef Lee was recruited by Gotham Bar and Grill's Alfred Portale for the chef de cuisine position at Stephen Starr's remake of the Striped Bass, in Philadelphia. Lee quickly rose to the executive chef position.

In August 2006, Chef Lee moved back to New York City to accept the executive chef position at Gilt, which earned him international acclaim. The restaurant received four stars from Crain's New York Business, and under Chef Lee's guidance, Gilt also earned its first-ever Michelin 2-star rating.

In late 2008, Lee accepted an offer from Charlie Palmer to be the executive chef at Aureole in NY. He led the transformation of Aureole from the quiet Upper Eastside townhouse, to a Times Square mega restaurant. The restaurant opened with three dining rooms, with significantly different menus and price points, which all operate from the same basement kitchen. It featured a fine dining room, with grand tasting menus; a bar/lounge with more casual seating and an à la carte menu; and a private dining room. In December 2010, Chef Lee and Charlie Palmer decided to part ways.

In March 2010, Chef Lee partnered up with a Chelsea restaurant, Las Chicas Locas, to oversee culinary operations, and promoted his protégé, Chef Katie Busch to executive chef. The two were contracted for one year to redesign the restaurant, menu, and operations. She also worked alongside Chef Lee as his sous chef, at Aureole during this time.

In October 2010, during his time at Aureole, Lee also opened his own restaurant, Eden South Beach, in Miami Beach Florida, with partner Larry Rizzo. Eden emulates Chef Lee's New American cuisine in a bistro setting, with the lush Garden of Eden bar and lounge, located in the back of the restaurant space. He named Matthew Duryea, formerly of New York, his chef de cuisine. Chef Lee has contributed to many local charities, such as Share our Strength (Miami Chapter), Miami Animal Services, Naples Food and Wine Festival, Miami Zoo, and Funkshion Fashion Week. Eden has participated in the South Beach Food and Wine Festival, 2011, and hosted the company party for Food and Wine Magazine. In the middle of 2011, Chef Lee partnered with Larry Rizzo, picking up two more additions, Kevin McCaughan and Rocky Bruno, to open Huntington Social: a Gastropub in his hometown of Huntington, New York. The New York Times has rated this a "Don't Miss" restaurant, calling it a "hidden gem".

== Charity ==
He has already begun donating to charity by way of the Huntington Historical Society, and a memorial for September 11. The decor of this venue channels a 1920s speakeasy, with red velvet banquettes, and white marble tabletops.

== Consulting ==
Lee has C.LEE Consulting, which allows him to consult for other restaurateurs, including Mark Advent and the Orange County Choppers. Lee is planning the Hot Meat Truck to serve lunch in NYC later this year (2011).

== Awards ==
- "Top Ten Best New Chefs of 2006" by Food and Wine Magazine
- "Best Chef 2005" by Philadelphia Magazine
- Striped Bass - Philadelphia Inquirer highly coveted Four Bells rating review
- Striped Bass - Travel + Leisure's "Best New American Restaurants 2004" issue
- Striped Bass - Gourmet one of the top restaurants in the country in 2006.
- James Beard Awards "2005 Rising Star Chef of the Year"
- James Beard Foundation nomination for "2006 Best Chef, Mid-Atlantic".
- "2 Michelin stars"- The Michelin Guide

== See also ==
- Justin Bogle
- Paul Liebrandt
