= Toshiro Konishi =

Japanese Peruvian chef, musician and television personality

Toshiro Konishi (July 11, 1953 – April 16, 2016) was a Japanese Peruvian chef, musician, and television personality. Konishi, a pioneer of Japanese cuisine in Peru, opened one of the first Japanese restaurants in Lima in 1977. He was one of Peru's most famous chefs, and became a recognized television personality in the country. In 2008, the Japanese Ministry of Agriculture, Forestry and Fisheries awarded him the Minister's Prize. Konishi was the first Japanese chef based in Latin America to receive the award from the ministry.

== Early life ==
Konishi was born on July 11, 1953. He was the fourth son of a Japanese restaurateur in Saito, Miyazaki Prefecture. He began working in the kitchen when he was 11 years old. In 1971, he moved to Tokyo to become a chef at a restaurant called Fumi.

== Career ==
In 1974, Konishi moved from Japan to Peru to work with another chef, Nobu Matsuhisa, who is now known for his Nobu fusion restaurants in Peru, the United States, and other countries. Konishi worked and operated a Lima restaurant called Matsuei, one of the first in the city to specialize in Japanese food, for ten years. He then opened two additional Japanese eateries, Toshiro's and Wako, which were located in Lima's Sheraton hotel.

Konishi was an early pioneer of Peruvian Fusion cuisine, which mixes Japanese and Peruvian culinary traditions. He was a regular participant in international food festivals. He also taught at Universidad San Ignacio de Loyola in Lima. He opened Mesa 18 at the Miraflores Hotel in Lima in 2013, and the Oishii, his most recent restaurant, in 2015.

In 2008, the Japanese Ministry of Agriculture, Forestry and Fisheries awarded him the Minister's Prize. Konishi was the first Japanese chef based in Latin America to receive the award from the ministry.

Konishi died from cancer on April 17, 2016, at the age of 63. His wife and daughter have since taken over the Toshiro brand.
