= Earl Flansburgh =

American architect

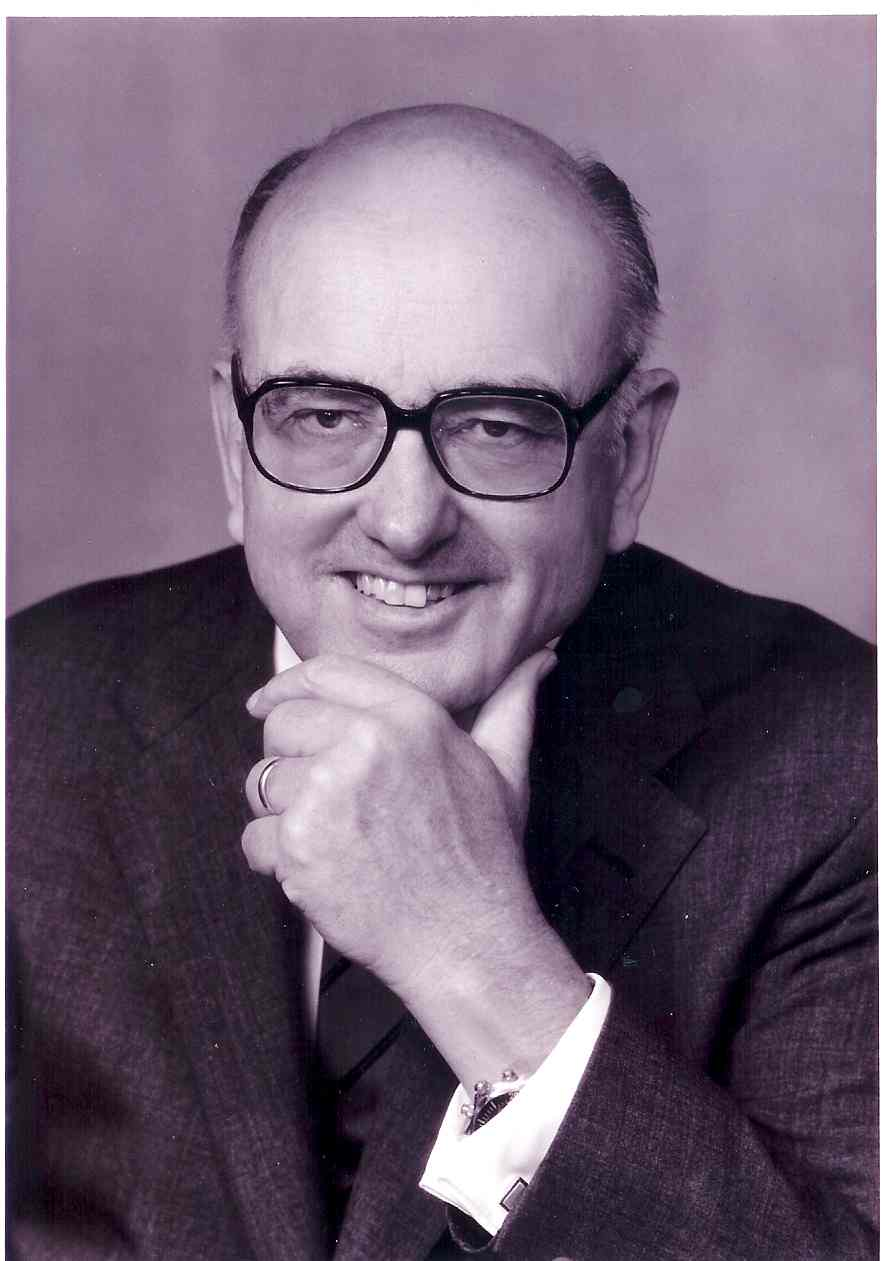
- Flansburgh in March 1996
- Born: April 28, 1931; Ithaca, New York, U.S.
- Died: February 3, 2009 (aged 77); Boston, Massachusetts, U.S.
- Education: Cornell Architecture School, MIT
- Occupation: Architect
- Spouse: Louise "Polly" Flansburgh
- Children: Paxus Calta; John Flansburgh
- Relatives: Ralph Hospital (father-in-law)

Earl Robert Flansburgh (April 28, 1931 – February 3, 2009) was an American architect known for his modernist style and extensive work in the Boston area.

== Early life and education ==
Flansburgh grew up in Ithaca, New York. His father, Earl Alvah Flansburgh, was a professor at Cornell University.

Flansburgh graduated from the Cornell Architecture School in 1954, where he was also a member of the Quill and Dagger society. While at Cornell, Flansburgh was manager of the freshmen's men orientation camp.

From August 1954 through August 1956, Flansburgh served in the United States Air Force. In 1957, Flansburgh received a master's degree from the Massachusetts Institute of Technology (MIT), and taught in London as a Fulbright scholar.

=== Ties to Cornell ===
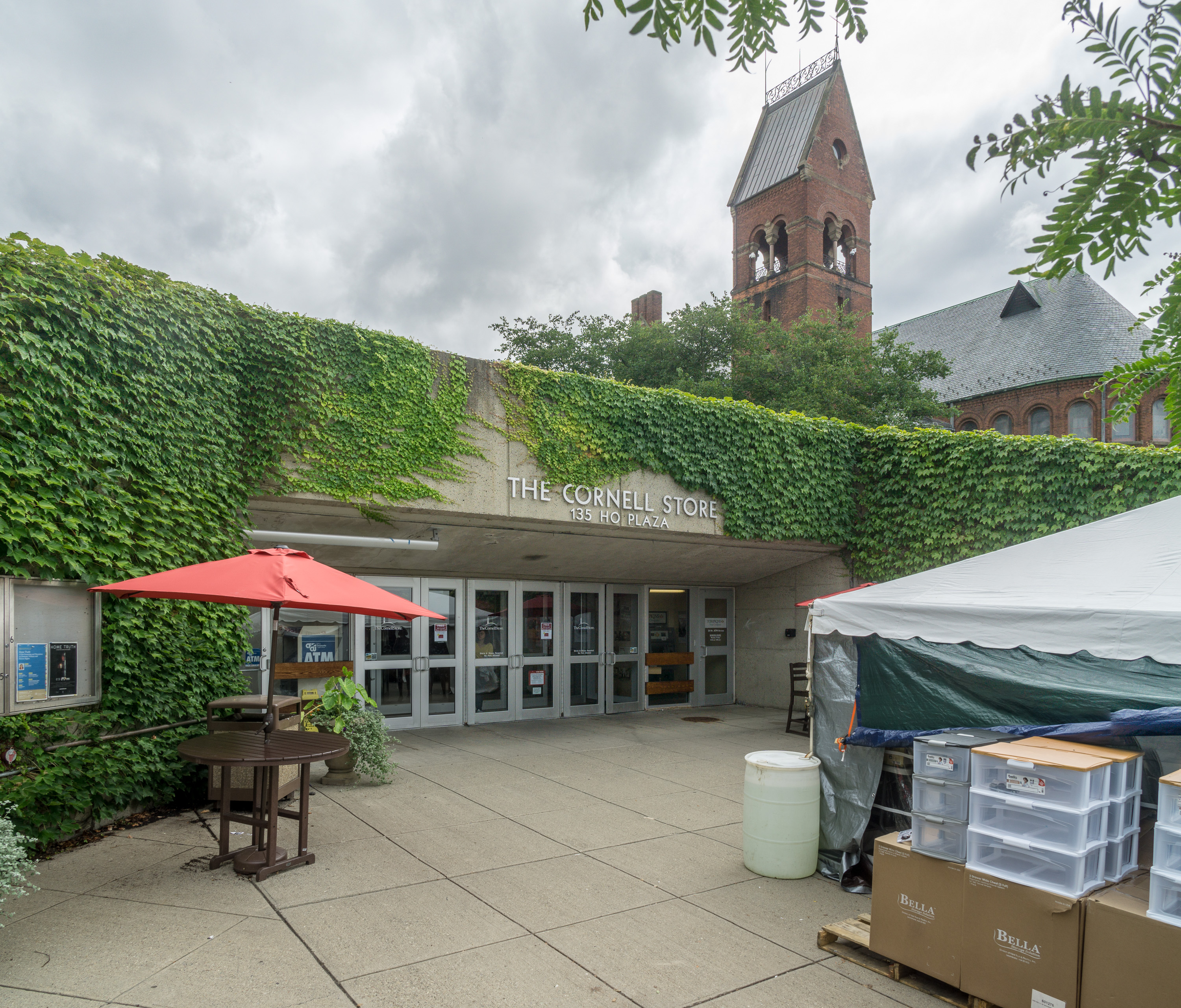
The Cornell Store, built underground (1971).

Flansburgh and his wife both had deep ties to Cornell University. Both their parents were professors there. His wife's grandfather was a member of the school's first graduating class of 1869, which made their son Earl the first-ever fifth-generation Cornellian.

From 1972 until 1987, Flansburgh was a University trustee, serving as chairman of the Buildings and Properties Committee. He designed the school's Campus Store and Builder's Wall; the store was honored with a citation by Progressive Architecture magazine in January 1969.

In the 1980s, the Flansburgh-headed Buildings and Properties Committee approved the controversial decision to demolish Stone Hall, Roberts Hall, and East Roberts Hall, over the objections of the City of Ithaca and local preservationist groups. This trio constituted the original buildings of the New York State College of Agriculture at Cornell University, and was listed on the National Register of Historic Places and as city historic landmarks.

== Career ==
In 1963, Flansburgh formed the architecture firm, Earl R. Flansburgh & Associates (ERF+A) in Cambridge, Massachusetts. In January 1969, Progressive Architecture selected Flansburgh's underground Cornell Campus Store for one of its 16 annual design awards. Under his direction, the firm won over 80 regional and national design awards.

Throughout his professional career, Flansburgh also taught or lectured about architecture at institutions including MIT, Wellesley College, and the Architectural Association School of Architecture in London.

Flansburgh received the Award of Honor for Lifetime Achievement from the Boston Society of Architects in 1999. His design of the Cornell University Campus Store was honored with a citation in Progressive Architecture Magazine in January 1969.

== Personal life ==
Flansburgh married Louise "Polly" Hospital, the daughter of General Ralph Hospital, in August 1955. She went on to found Boston By Foot, a not-for-profit group that gives walking tours of historic sites in Boston.

The couple had two sons, Earl Schuyler Flansburgh (now known as Paxus Calta), born in 1957, and John Flansburgh, born in 1960. Calta is an anti-nuclear activist; John is a member and co-founder of the musical group They Might Be Giants.

Flansburgh was buried in February 2009 at Lincoln Cemetery in Middlesex County, Massachusetts.
