= Nobu Matsuhisa =

Japanese celebrity chef and restaurateur (born 1949)

Nobuyuki Matsuhisa
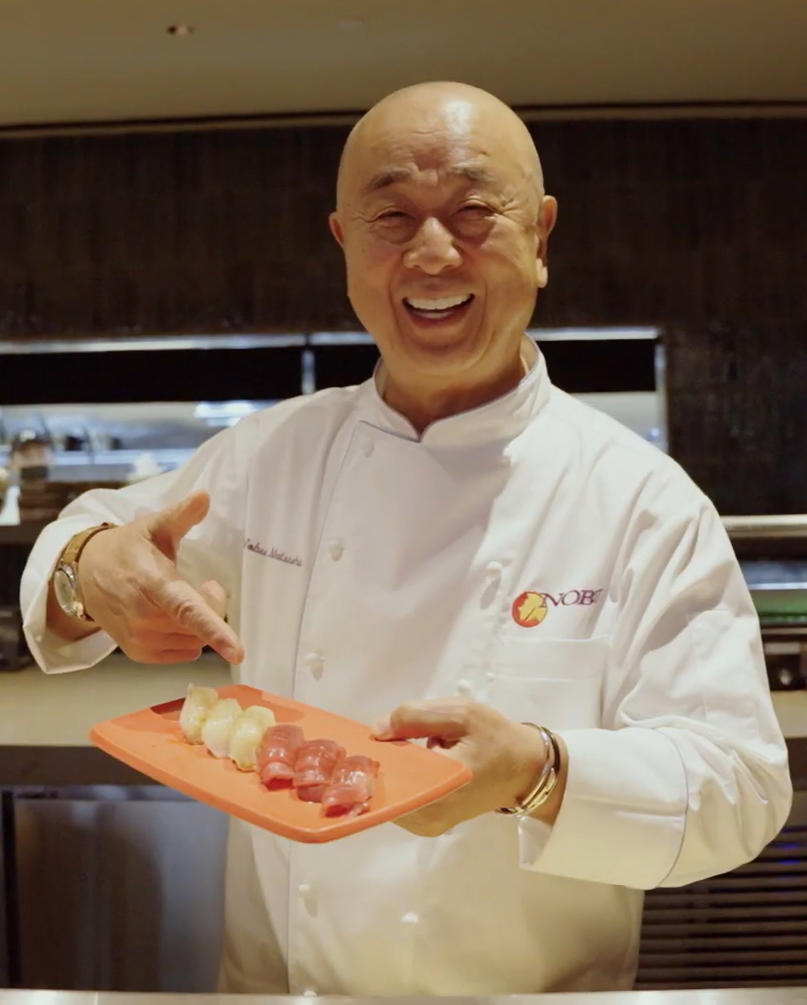
- Matsuhisa in 2023
- Born: March 10, 1949 (age 77); Saitama, Japan
- Culinary career
- Cooking style: Japanese
- Current restaurants
- Matsuhisa – Beverly Hills, California (opened 1987) – Aspen, Colorado (opened 1998) – Vail, Colorado (opened 2011) – Munich (opened 2016) – Denver, Colorado (opened 2016) – Paris (opened 2016) – St. Moritz, Switzerland (opened 2017) – Limassol, Cyprus (opened 2019) – Mykonos, Greece – Vouliagmeni, Greece – Toronto, Canada (opened 2024) Nobu – New York (opened 1994) – London (opened 1997) – Tokyo (opened 1998) – Malibu, California (opened 1999) – Las Vegas (opened 1999) – Miami Beach (opened 2001) – Berkley, London (opened 2005) – Crescent Court, Dallas (opened 2005) – Fifty Seven, New York City (opened 2005) – Dallas (opened 2006) – Hong Kong, Regent Hong Kong (opened 2006) – Palm Jumeirah, Dubai (opened 2006) – Melbourne (opened 2007) – San Diego (opened 2007) – Los Angeles (opened 2008) – Mexico City (opened 2009) – Perth (opened 2012) – Kuala Lumpur (opened 2014) – Mexico City (opened 2014) – City of Dreams Manila (opened 2015) – Washington, D.C. (opened 2017) – Palo Alto (opened 2017) – Newport Beach, California (opened 2017) – Houston (Opened 2018) – Los Cabos, Mexico (opened 2019) – Chicago (Opened 2020) – Atlanta (Opened 2022) – Sydney (Opened 2022) – Indian Wells, California (opened 2023) – Toronto, Canada (opened 2024) Armani – Milan (opened 2000) Ubon by Nobu, London (opened 2000) Next Door Nobu, New York City (opened 1998) – Monte Carlo, Monaco

Nobuyuki "Nobu" Matsuhisa (松久 信幸, Matsuhisa Nobuyuki; born March 10, 1949) is a Japanese celebrity chef and restaurateur known for his fusion cuisine blending traditional Japanese dishes with Peruvian ingredients. His signature dish is black cod in miso. He has restaurants bearing his name in several countries and major cities such as New York City, London, Paris, Los Angeles, Sydney, Hong Kong, Kuala Lumpur and Tokyo. He has also played small parts in three major films.

== Biography ==
Nobu was born in Saitama, Japan. When he was eight years old, his father died in a traffic crash, and he and his two older brothers were raised by his mother. Immediately following the death of his father, Nobu began to travel the world. Over the next decade, while being raised by his mother, Nobu Matsuhisa experienced many cultures and witnessed first hand the reaches of poverty and hunger. His experience influenced his efforts later in life to give back to communities through his business ventures.

After graduating from high school, he began working as a dishwasher at the restaurant Matsue Sushi in Shinjuku, Tokyo. It was in the same restaurant, where he was trained as a Sushi master. After seven years, he was invited by a regular customer, Luis Matsufuji, who was a Peruvian of Japanese descent, to open a Japanese restaurant in Peru. In 1973 at age 24, he moved to Lima, Peru, and opened a restaurant with the same name of Matsue in partnership with his sponsor and another itamae, Toshiro Konishi. Nobu was unable to find many of the ingredients he took for granted in Japan and had to improvise, and it was here that he developed his unique style of cuisine that incorporated Peruvian ingredients into Japanese dishes. But after three years, the restaurant had to close. After a short stay in Argentina, where he tried to open a new restaurant, he eventually moved to Anchorage, Alaska, and opened his own restaurant there. About two weeks after the grand opening there was an electrical fire and the restaurant burned down.

In 1977, he moved to Los Angeles and worked at Japanese restaurants "Mitsuwa" and "Oshou." In 1987, he opened his own restaurant "Matsuhisa" on La Cienega Boulevard in Los Angeles, California. It was in the Matsuhisa he came to know Robert De Niro, who encouraged him to open a restaurant in New York. By 1994, he laid the foundation to a new restaurant chain, as he opened the first "Nobu" in Tribeca, New York City, in a joint venture between Robert De Niro, Drew Nieporent, Meir Teper and himself. In 1995, he received the James Beard Foundation Award and was nominated for it several times in the following years.

== Acting ==
Nobu has had small roles in three major films: in Casino (1995) alongside his business partner Robert De Niro, in Austin Powers in Goldmember (2002), and in Memoirs of a Geisha (2005). In 2013, Nobu had a larger supporting role in the international film The Girl from Nagasaki, playing the father of the lead character.

== Hotels ==
As of March 2021, there are at least 15 Nobu hotels, including locations in Chicago, Ibiza, Las Vegas, two in London, Los Cabos, Malibu, Manila, Marbella, Miami Beach, Palo Alto, Warsaw, Doha and Barcelona.

== Books ==
- Matsuhisa, Nobu; Edwards, Mark (2007). Nobu West. Andrews McMeel. ISBN 978-0-7407-6547-6.
- Matsuhisa, Nobuyuki; Niro, Robert De (2001). Nobu: The Cookbook. Kodansha International. ISBN 4-7700-2533-5.
- Matsuhisa, Nobuyuki (2005). Nobu Now. Clarkson Potter. ISBN 0-307-23673-0.
- 松久信幸; Matsuhisa, Nobu; Buckley, Thomas (2008). Nobu Miami: The Party Cookbook. Kodansha International. ISBN 978-4-7700-3080-1.
- Matsuhisa, Nobu (2012). Nobu's Vegetarian Cookbook. Pie Books. ISBN 978-4-89444-9053.
- Matsuhisa, Nobuyuki (2019). World of Nobu. Pie International Company, Limited. ISBN 978-4-7562-5147-3.
- Matsuhisa, Nobu (2014). Nobu: A Memoir. Simon and Schuster. ISBN 978-1-5011-2279-8.

== See also ==
- List of restaurants in the Las Vegas Valley
