= Paxus Calta =

American political activist (born 1957)

- Calta at a protest at the Temelín Nuclear Power Station in the Czech Republic in 1996
- Born: Earl Schuyler Flansburgh; 1957 (age 68–69)
- Occupation: Political activist
- Years active: 1990s–present

Paxus Calta (born 1957), born Earl Schuyler "Sky" Flansburgh, is an American political activist, communitarian and writer. He has been involved with the anti-nuclear movement and is a member of the Twin Oaks Community.

== Early life and education ==
Calta was born in 1957 as Earl Schuyler Flansburgh, or "Sky" as a nickname. Calta studied engineering and economics at Cornell University, where he served as a student member of the Board of Trustees and as a member of the Quill and Dagger society. Afterward he worked as a software designer, helping to found and ultimately sell two software consulting firms.

== Early career ==
In 1982, he changed his name to Paxus Calta. In 1988, he hitchhiked on sailboats across the Pacific, settled briefly in Australia and then moved on to Hawai'i where he worked for Makai Ocean Engineering. After the fall of the Berlin Wall, Calta moved to the Netherlands and worked for The World Information Service on Energy (WISE) in Amsterdam.

Calta was invited by a Czech deep ecology organization, Hnutí DUHA, to run the international campaign against the Temelín Nuclear Power Station from Brno, Czechoslovakia in 1991, which remained his primary home base for most of the 1990s and from where he campaigned against nuclear power. During this time, he "moved up" in the Friends of the Earth hierarchy. In 1998, Calta moved to Twin Oaks Community, located in Virginia in the United States.

Calta is a proponent of polyamory and writes on the topic. In 2004, he wrote a chapter of the book The Impossible Will Take a Little While (compiled by Paul Rogat Loeb), in which he detailed a successful campaign launched by an 18-year-old to overthrow the Bulgarian government.

== Political activism ==
Throughout the 1990s, Calta was involved in campaigns to stop nuclear power plants in 6 countries in Central Europe. Calta was the Chair of the international campaign commemorating the 10th anniversary of the Chernobyl disaster. and co-managed the FAIRE project (Free & Applied Internships in Renewables and Efficiency) which trained Central European activists in English language skills, campaigning and then placed them in western environmental groups as interns. The FAIRE project was funded by the Heinrich Böll Foundation, which is affiliated with the German Green Party. Hnutí DUHA invited Calta to be the lead international anti-nuclear campaigner after he left WISE. In 1994, Calta presented materials before the US House of Representative Subcommittee on International Development to block the Export-Import Bank of the United States from funding the Temelín reactor.

Calta initiated the Clean Energy Brigade project in the early 1990s in the Czech Republic in which local activists installed energy saving hardware in residential homes and public buildings at materials cost in exchange for documentation of reduced energy use. The program was later expanded to 11 Central and East European countries and is now called the International Energy Brigades. In aggregate, the efficiency upgrades from this project are abating thousands of tons of CO_{2} annually.

More recently, he campaigned against a planned new reactor at North Anna in Virginia and was arrested and jailed for protests there. On December 4, 2009 Calta critiqued Stewart Brand on NPR on the merits of using nuclear power to stop climate change. Calta served on the board of directors of the anti-nuclear group Nuclear Information and Resource Service (NIRS) from 1997 til 2010, and as the president of the board for the last 3 years.

After the August 23, 2011, Virginia earthquake which closed down the North Anna nuclear power plant, Calta and others founded the organization "Not on Our Fault Line", for which Calta has been repeatedly a spokesperson.

On November 30, 2011, Calta was arrested with 17 others in Charlottesville, Virginia as part of the Occupy Charlottesville protest.

In late 2013, Calta co-founded the Point A project designed to start income sharing communities in urban centers on the East Coast of the US. These communities would be part of the Federation of Egalitarian Communities. In 2015, the Point A project launched its first new income sharing project in Washington DC called Compersia.

On 16 January 2017, Certa presented an interactive workshop on activism at Elon University. His effort was to describe methods that can be used, and motivate participants to choose their own causes. His perspective was described as un-American when critically covered by the business advice company American Lens. His response to their critique was, "Appreciate being targeted". In the summer of 2018, BBC 4 filmed part of their Utopia series at Twin Oaks, Calta was the principal guide.

== Lifestyle activism ==
Calta authored a pamphlet about polyamory which has been translated into 5 languages. Calta considers himself an anarchist and is the principal organizer of the Fingerbook Propaganda Project, which produces and distributes "Fingerbooks" (small handbooks) on consensus decision-making, designing revolutions, polyamory, and intentional communities.

He has also been a member of Twin Oaks Community since 1998, serving as the community's recruiting manager, manager of outside work and a general manager of Twin Oaks Hammocks, Inc. He has appeared on both CNN and Voice of America videos discussing the community.

== Family ==
Calta is the son of the late Earl R. Flansburgh, a Boston architect, and the older brother of John Flansburgh, of rock band They Might Be Giants. His grandfather is Ralph Hospital through his mother, Polly Flansburgh, who is the founder and president of Boston by Foot, which gives architectural walking tours of the city of Boston.
