= Francis Derby =

American chef

- Born: 1977 or 1978 (age 48–49); Bellport, New York, United States

Francis J. Derby is an American chef. He was trained under Paul Liebrandt, going on to help open and work in restaurants like wd~50, Mugaritz, and Momofuku Ssäm Bar, before opening his own concepts.

== Early life ==
Derby was born and raised in Bellport, New York, having grown up on his grandfather's duck farm. He began working in restaurants at age 14, becoming a dishwasher at a local seafood restaurant. From there, he began doing prep work and assisting chefs, finding himself working at three different restaurants in Bellport by the time he was 18 years old.

== Career ==
Derby moved to New York City around the year 2000, working under chef Paul Liebrandt's restaurant, Atlas. He would go on to help Wylie Dufresne open his restaurant, wd~50, move to Spain to work at Mugaritz under chef Andoni Luis Aduriz, return to New York to develop menu concepts with Liebrant at Gilt, worked as sous chef under David Chang at Momofuku Ssäm Bar, and then became chef de cuisine at Shorty's .32 under chef Josh Eden.

In January 2012, Derby worked for King in Soho, only holding the position for three months before walking out.

Derby was employed by Jeffrey Epstein from May to November 2012, acting as one of his personal chefs. Derby prepared beef jerky for Epstein, causing the phrase "jerky" to appear multiple times in the Epstein files. It was speculated that the phrase "jerky" referred to human meat. Further encouraging conspiracy theorists, Derby was the executive chef for a restaurant and butcher's shop called The Cannibal, which was named after the nickname of Belgian cyclist Eddy Merckx.

In 2013, Derby created a menu to serve alongside a showing of American Psycho at Nitehawk Cinema.

Derby moved across the United States, from New York to Los Angeles, California, to open The Cannibal in 2016.

In March 2023, Derby helped organize a fundraiser to benefit the workers of Crescent Duck Farm, who were laid off following an outbreak of H5N1. Later in the year, Derby, along with his partners, opened The State Room in Patchogue, New York. He would later launch Shands General, another restaurant, in Patchogue. Derby left the area in May 2025 to become the culinary director at Arbus Hospitality, which oversees operations at hotels such as The Halyard at Sound View, on Greenport's waterfront, and The Harborfront Inn, also in Greenport.

== Personal life ==
Derby's grandfather, Lou Gallo, owned the Gallo Duck Farm and was in the industry until 1987.
