= Corton (restaurant) =

Defunct restaurant in New York City, U.S.

Coordinates: 40°43′10″N 74°00′21″W

- Interactive map of Corton

Restaurant information
- Established: 2008; 18 years ago
- Closed: July 2013; 12 years ago
- Rating: (Michelin Guide)
- Location: New York City, United States

Corton was a New French cuisine restaurant located at 239 West Broadway (between Walker Street and White Street) in Tribeca, Manhattan, in New York City run by chef Paul Liebrandt and restaurateur Drew Nieporent.

== History ==
It opened in 2008 on the site of Montrachet, a restaurant Nieporent had opened in 1985. It held two stars in the New York City Michelin Guide. It closed in July 2013 when Chef Liebrandt left to open The Elm in Brooklyn. The restaurant is featured in the 2011 documentary A Matter of Taste.

== Reception ==
In 2013, Zagats gave it a food rating of 26, and a decor rating of 24. Corton maintained 3 stars from The New York Times and has been named the 2nd Best Restaurant in New York City by GQ Magazine.

== See also ==
- List of French restaurants
