= Steven A. Carter =

American writer

Steven A. Carter (Author)
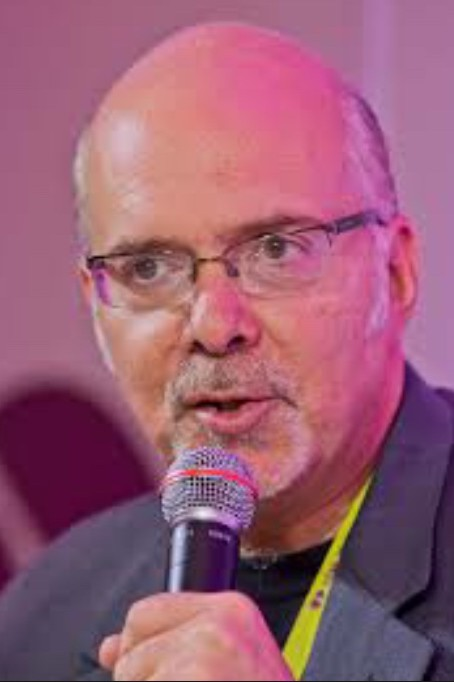
- Carter at the Bienal do Livro, Rio de Janeiro, Brazil
- Born: Steven Andrew Carter; October 23, 1956 (age 69); New York City, New York
- Occupation: author
- Writing career
- Genres: non-fiction, self-help, humor
- Subjects: relationships, psychology, health

Steven A. Carter (born October 23, 1956) is an American author of non-fiction, self-help and humor.

A distinguished graduate of Cornell University, member of the Quill and Dagger honorary, and winner of the William K. Kennedy Dean's Prize for academic achievement, Steven A. Carter also holds a Master's Degree in Education and a master's degree in psychology.

Steven Carter was born in New York City and raised in New Hyde Park, New York. He is the author of twenty-eight books, including the New York Times bestseller Men Who Can't Love (with co-author Julia Sokol) and seven other National Bestsellers. More than ten million copies of his books are in circulation worldwide. Carter coined the phrase "commitmentphobia" in 1987 and is recognized as one of the foremost authorities on the subjects of commitment, fear of commitment, attachment disorders, and narcissistic personality disorder. He has also been a ghostwriter of various works of humor and non-fiction.

== Books and other writing ==
Steven Carter's most popular books include:

- Men Who Can't Love (M.Evans & Co., 1987) ISBN 0-425-11170-9
- What Really Happens In Bed (M.Evans & Co., 1989) ISBN 0-87131-562-9
- What Smart Women Know (M.Evans & Co., 1990) ISBN 0-87131-906-3
- He's Scared, She's Scared (Delacorte, 1993) ISBN 0-440-50625-5
- Men Like Women Who Like Themselves (Delacorte, 1996) ISBN 0-440-50615-8
- Getting To Commitment (M.Evans & Co., 1998) ISBN 0-87131-869-5
- This Is How Love Works (M.Evans & Co., 2001) ISBN 0-87131-939-X
- Help! I'm In Love With A Narcissist (M.Evans & Co., 2005) ISBN 1-59077-077-3
- The Secrets of Self-Esteem (Editora Sextante, 2010) ISBN 978-85-7542-555-8
- Love & Self-Esteem: What the Smartest Women Know (2011) ISBN 978-0-615-56507-1

All of the above titles were co-authored with Julia Sokol. Carter and Sokol's first book on commitmentphobia, Men Who Can't Love, was an instant bestseller after Carter's first appearance on The Oprah Winfrey Show in 1987 (Carter appeared on the show five times between 1987 and 1997). Men Who Can't Love gained even more popularity when it was featured in the film When Harry Met Sally..., and later, in the Julia Roberts/Brad Pitt/James Gandolfini film The Mexican. The book has been translated into 30 languages, selling more than five million copies worldwide.

In the winter of 2007 What Smart Women Know was released in Brazil by Editora Sextante, the publishing company founded by brothers Marcos and Tomas Pereira. Editora Sextante is best known in Brazil for their publication of various works by Paulo Coelho, Augusto Cury, and the Dalai Lama. What Smart Women Know (Os Segredos das Mulheres Inteligentes) spent 110 weeks on Brazil's top-ten bestseller lists. Men Like Women Who Like Themselves was released in mid-2008 and spent 45 weeks on Brazil's bestseller lists. The Brazilian edition of Men Who Can't Love was released by Editora Sextante in late 2009, followed by The Secrets of Smart Women in May 2010 and How to Make Love Work in September 2011.

Editora Sextante has sold over two million copies of these Carter/Sokol titles in Brazil since their first release. In September 2011, Carter was an Honored Guest at the Bienal do Livro in Rio de Janeiro, invited by Brazilian President Dilma Rousseff to celebrate Brazil's 'Year of the Woman.'

Prior to beginning his career as an author, Steven Carter was the Director of Tennis at the world-renowned Little Dix Bay Hotel in the British Virgin Islands, and Head Tennis Pro at the Dorado Beach Hotel in Dorado Beach, Puerto Rico. His early work references those years in the Caribbean, explaining how they influenced his perspective.
