= Thomas W. Jones =

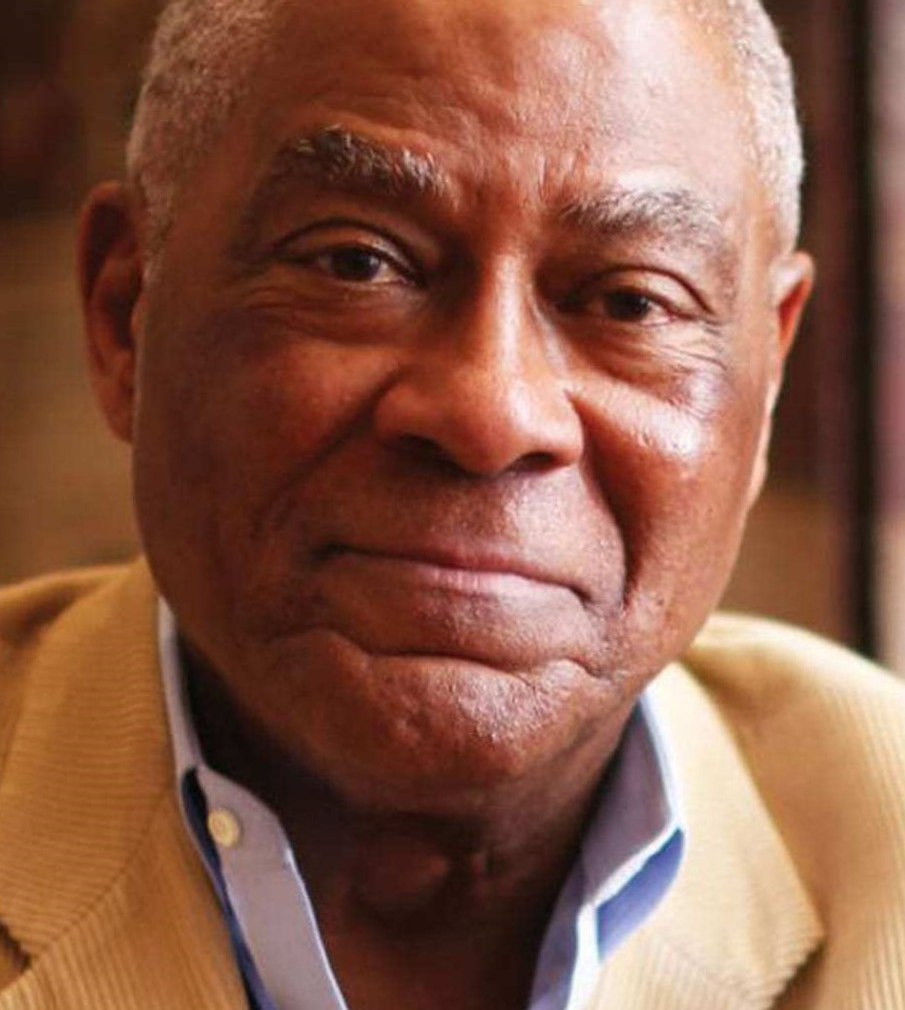
Jones in April 2019

Thomas Wade Jones (born 1949) is senior partner of TWJ Capital LLC. Previously he served as chairman and chief executive officer of Citigroup Inc.'s Global Investment Management from 1999 to 2004. He joined Travelers Group as vice chairman in 1997 and served as chairman and chief executive officer of Smith Barney Asset Management until October 1998. Prior to joining Travelers Group, Jones served as vice chairman of TIAA-CREF, the largest pension system in the United States, from 1995 to 1997, president and chief operating officer from 1993 to 1997, and chief financial officer from 1989 to 1993. From 1982 to 1989 Jones served as senior vice president and treasurer of the John Hancock Mutual Life Insurance Company.

Jones is a director of financial guarantor Assured Guaranty and financial services firm Jefferies Financial Group, and trustee emeritus of Cornell University. Past board positions include vice chairman of Federal Reserve Bank of New York, Altria Group, Freddie Mac, Travelers Group, Pepsi Bottling Group, Eastern Enterprises, Thomas & Betts Corporation, Investment Company Institute, and trustee of The Economic Club of New York.

As a student at Cornell University, Jones participated in a 36-hour armed occupation of Willard Straight Hall by African-American students on April 19, 1969. The occupation came to a peaceful resolution. The Africana Studies curriculum was later established at Cornell University. He was also selected for membership in Cornell's Quill and Dagger society, and later earned an MBA from Boston University.

In 1993, Jones created and endowed The James A. Perkins Prize for Interracial and Intercultural Peace and Harmony to honor the former Cornell University president who launched a successful effort to improve black student recruitment in the 1960s, and resigned Cornell's presidency in June 1969 following the Willard Straight Hall Takeover. The Perkins Prize is awarded annually to the Cornell program or organization making the most significant contribution to furthering the ideal of university community while respecting the values of racial and cultural diversity.

Thomas Jones is author of From Willard Straight to Wall Street: A Memoir (published by Cornell University Press, 2019), winner of the 2020 Axiom Business Book Bronze Prize in the memoir/biography category.

Jones is trustee emeritus of Cornell University; recipient of the Frank H.T. Rhodes Exemplary Alumni Service Award from Cornell University, and has been elected Presidential Councillor by Cornell University, the university's highest distinction. Jones has also been awarded honorary doctoral degrees by Howard University, Pepperdine University, and College of New Rochelle. Jones is cited in the book The 100 Most Notable Cornellians by Glenn C. Altschuler, Isaac Kramnick, and R. Laurence Moore (Cornell University Press, 2003)
