= Nobu =

Restaurant and hotel operator

Nobu Hospitality, LLC
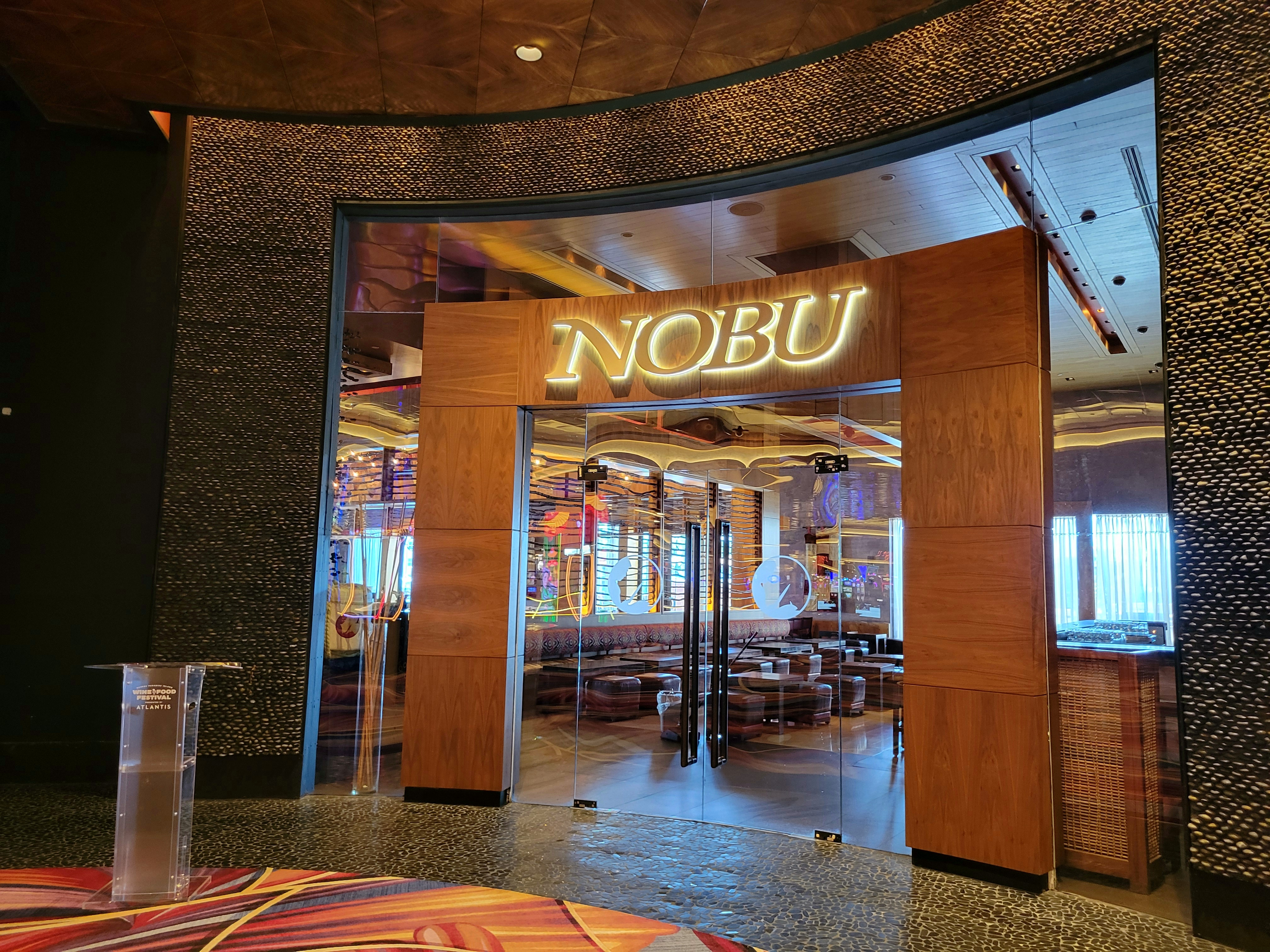
- Exterior view of Nobu Restaurant in Atlantis Paradise Island, in Nassau, Bahamas
- Founded: 1994
- Founders: Nobu Matsuhisa; Robert De Niro; Meir Teper
- Number of locations: 36 hotels; 56 restaurants
- Divisions: Nobu Hotels; Nobu Restaurants

Nobu Hospitality, LLC is an American company founded by Nobu Matsuhisa, Robert De Niro, and Meir Teper in partnerships with Drew Nieporent as an operator with Myriad Restaurant Group.

== History ==
In 1987, Nobu Matsuhisa moved to Los Angeles and opened the eponymous restaurant Matsuhisa. Actor Robert De Niro first visited the restaurant in 1988. After that, he became a regular customer. In 1989, De Niro suggested to Matsuhisa that he open a restaurant in Tribeca, New York City. While Matsuhisa thought De Niro's proposal was attractive, he declined, feeling he should first focus on establishing a solid foundation for his Los Angeles restaurant. De Niro waited until 1994 before he floated the idea to Matsuhisa again, and this time Matsuhisa agreed.

Matsuhisa, De Niro, restaurateur Drew Nieporent, and investor Meir Teper agreed to a joint venture. On 17 September 1994, the first Nobu opened. While living in Lima, Peru, Matsuhisa developed his signature style: melding Japanese techniques with Peruvian ingredients. Nobu's famous signature dish is black cod with miso.

In 1997 the first Nobu opened outside of the United States, in London. As of 2023, there are 56 restaurants worldwide.

The first Nobu Hotel opened inside Caesars Palace, Las Vegas, in 2013. Two years later, in May 2015, Nobu opened a hotel in the City of Dreams, Manila, Philippines. In October of the same year, Crown Resorts bought a 20% stake of Nobu for US$100 million. By October 2020, the chain had 13 hotels, including one in Ibiza, Spain, opened in 2017. In November 2022, the first Nobu Hotel in the Southeast opened in Atlanta, Georgia. Crown Resorts, acquired by Blackstone in 2022, sold its stake in Nobu to a Blackstone portfolio company in July 2024.

In March 2025, Nobu Hospitality signed up to open a hotel, restaurant and residences in a £360m planned skyscraper in Manchester. The project, known as Viadux 2, has been earmarked for land between Manchester Central and the Deansgate-Castlefield Metrolink Station. In April 2025, the project was approved. A Nobu hotel is planned to open in Barbuda in 2026.
