= Montrachet (restaurant) =

French restaurant

- Interactive map of Montrachet

Restaurant information
- Established: 1985
- Closed: 2006
- Location: 239 West Broadway, New York, New York, 10013, United States
- Coordinates: 40°43′10.4″N 74°0′21″W

Montrachet was a French restaurant in Tribeca, Manhattan, New York City, that opened to a three-star reviews in April 1985 on West Broadway; It closed in the summer of 2006 following some down years and a struggle to find new partners. The restaurant's wine cellar was sold at auction in 2007.

The restaurant was part of Myriad Restaurant Group and Montrachet's establishment in the neighborhood eventually paved the way for the group's later successes, Batard and Tribeca Grill.

Drew Nieporent detailed the early years of the restaurant in his 2023 book, I'm Not Trying To Be Difficult.

== Alumni ==
Staff who have worked at Montrachet include Bill Yosses, David Bouley (the original chef), and Debra Ponzek.
