= Boston By Foot =

American non-profit tour organization

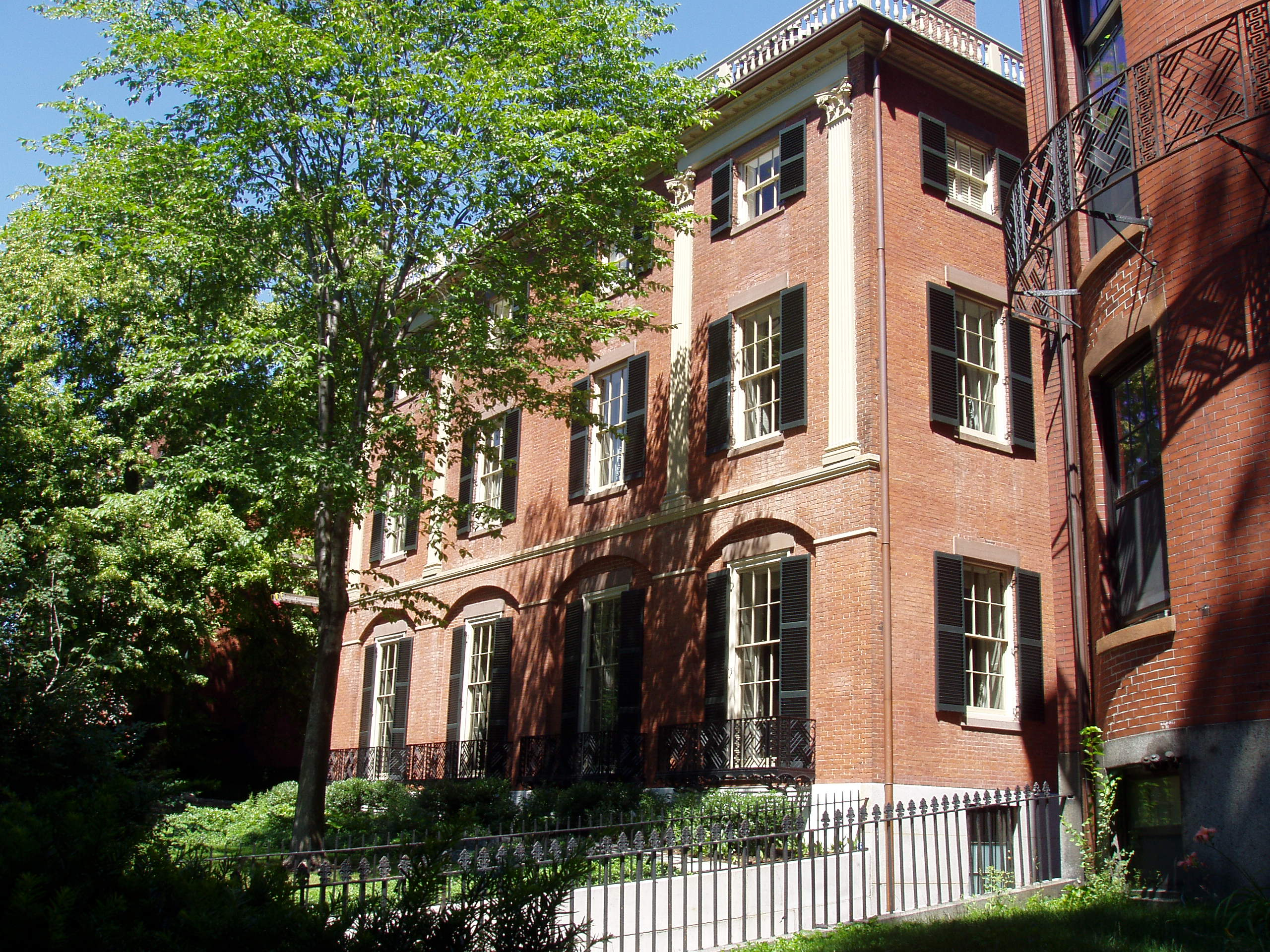
2nd Harrison Gray Otis House, 85 Mount Vernon Street

Boston By Foot is a non-profit organization that does guided architectural and historical tours of Boston, Massachusetts. Founded in 1976, Boston By Foot does daily scheduled tours from May through October. Tours are conducted by a trained corps of over 200 volunteers. In 2007, there were 210,000 participants of Boston By Foot tours.

== Regular tours ==
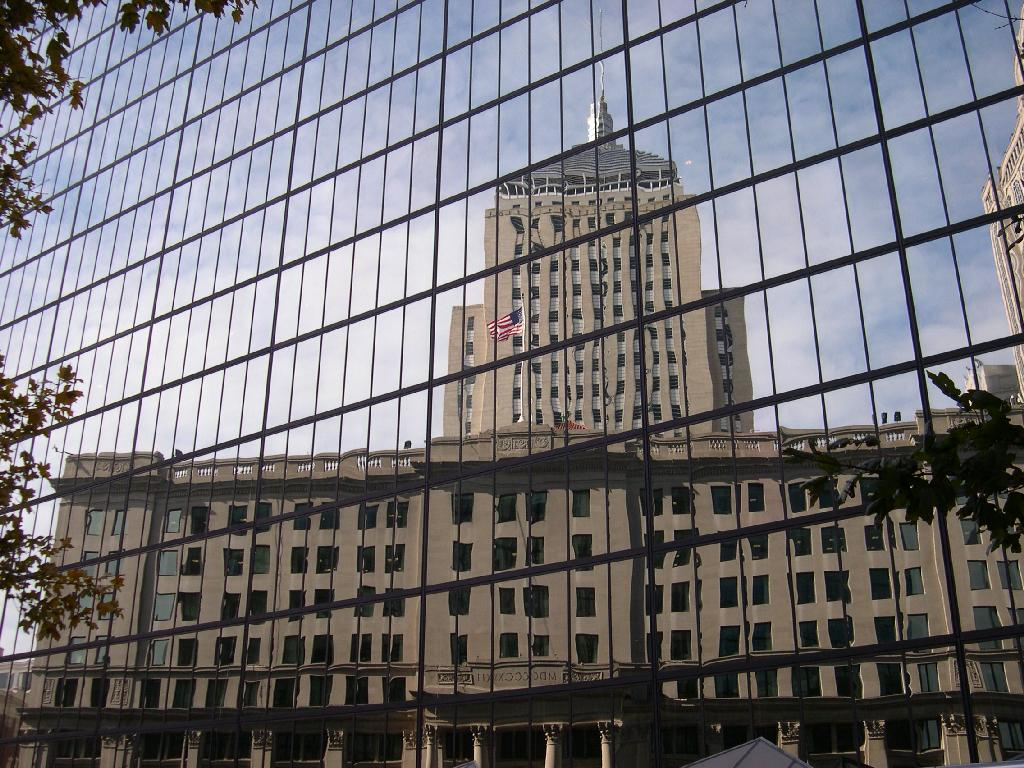
The three John Hancock buildings

- Beacon Hill
- Boston By Little Feet – children's tour
- The Dark Side of Boston
- The Heart of the Freedom Trail
- Literary Landmarks
- North End
- Reinventing Boston: A City Engineered
- Road to Revolution
- Victorian Back Bay

== Lecture Series and docent training ==
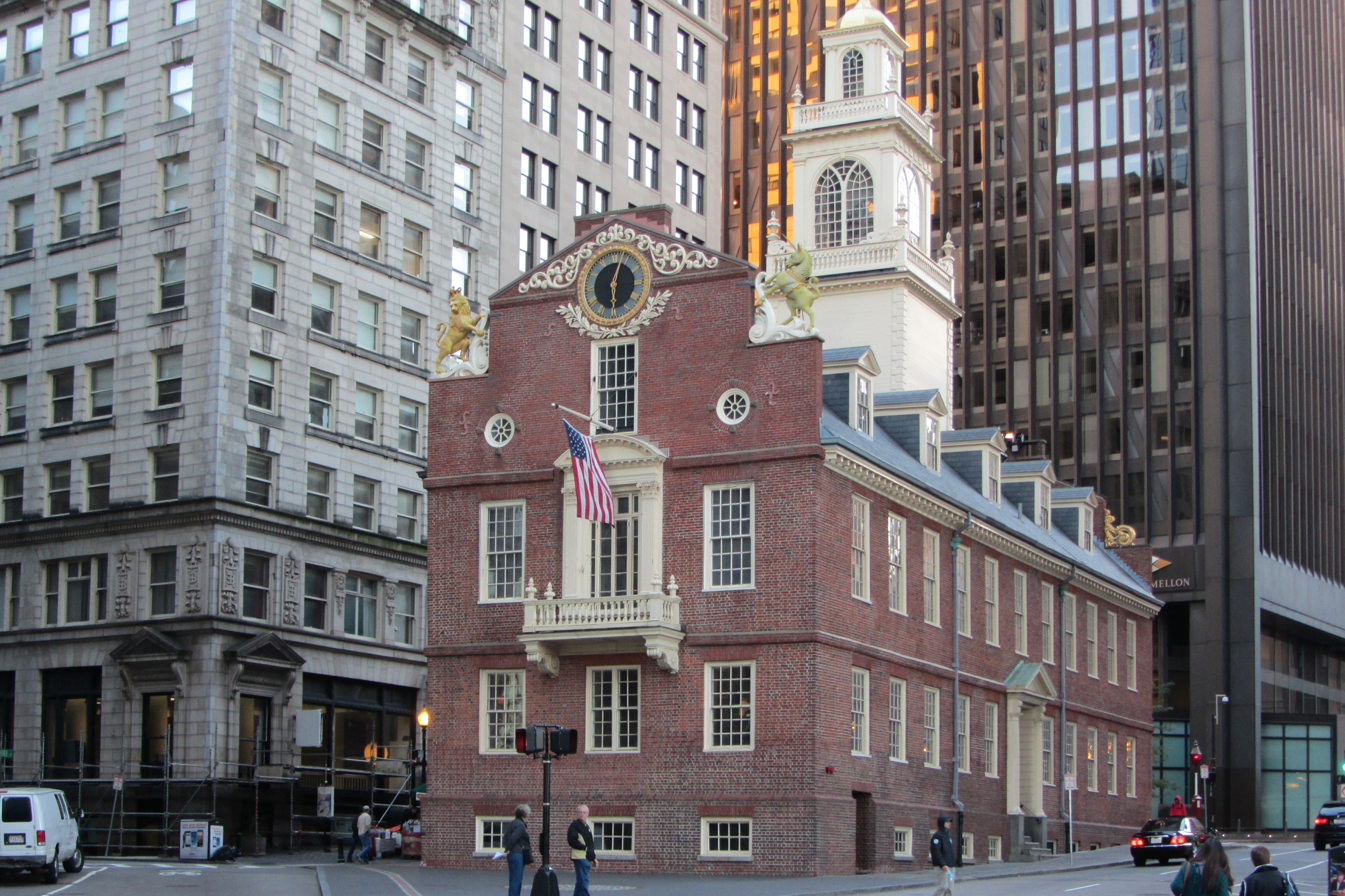
The Old State House surrounded by buildings of the 19th and 20th centuries

Each spring, Boston By Foot does a six-week Lecture Series. Each Saturday session features a lecturer (experienced architects, historians, and engineers) as well as an afternoon field trip. It is open to the public and required for those wishing to become a volunteer guide.

- Colonial Boston
- Federal Boston
- Victorian Boston
- Contemporary Boston
- Subterranean Boston

== Awards ==
Boston By Foot has received several honors including: Honorary Membership, American Institute of Architects 2003; Best Tour of Boston 1999, Boston Magazine; Institute Honors, American Institute of Architects, 1996; Commonwealth Award, Boston Society of Architects, 1986; Honorary Membership, Boston Society of Architects, 1982; Editor's Pick, Yankee Magazine, 1996, 1997, 1998, 2000, 2001, 2002; Volunteer Recognition, The New England, 1997.

== See also ==
- History of Boston, Massachusetts
- San Francisco City Guides
