= Paul Liebrandt =

British chef and restaurateur

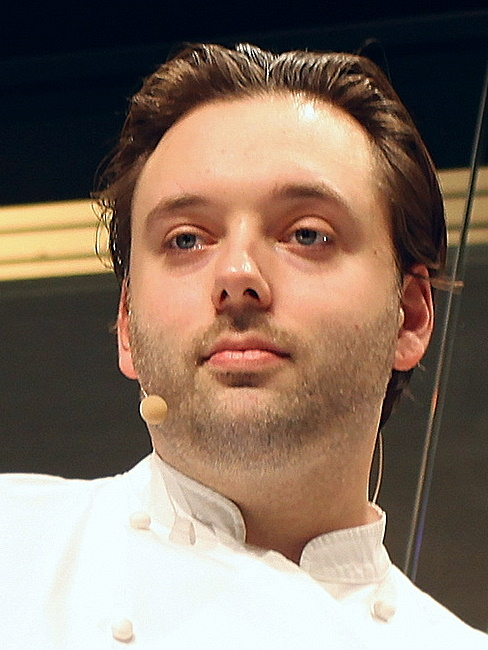
- Chef Paul Liebrandt
- Born: 26 August 1976 (age 50); Salisbury, Rhodesia
- Culinary career
- Cooking style: Modern French
- Rating
- Former Michelin stars
- Previous restaurants
- The Elm (2013–2015); Corton (2008–2013); Gilt, New York (2005–2006); Papillon, New York (2001–2003); Atlas, New York (2000–2001); Bouley Bakery, New York (1999–2000); Pierre Gagnaire, Paris (1996–1998); Le Manoir aux Quat' Saisons, Oxford (1994–1996); L'Escargot, London, England (1992–1994); The Restaurant Marco Pierre White, London; Pied à Terre, London; New York New York, London
- Awardss
- Two Stars, Corton, Michelin Guide, 2009; Best New Chef, Food and Wine, 2009; The Best and the Brightest, Esquire, 2002; Youngest Three Star Chef, New York Times, 2000
- Website: paulliebrandt.com

Paul Liebrandt is a British chef and restaurateur. He was the co-owner of Corton restaurant in New York City and the subject of the documentary film, A Matter of Taste: Serving Up Paul Liebrandt. Liebrandt is known for his daring cuisine, creativity and eccentric style, and has been awarded two Michelin stars. He previously worked at Atlas, Gilt and Papillon restaurants in New York, Corton and The Elm.

Liebrandt was born in Salisbury, Rhodesia (now Harare, Zimbabwe) on 26 August 1976 and was raised in London, England. After accumulating experience in upscale restaurants in London and Paris, he moved to New York in 1999.

== Career ==
After his parents divorced when he was eleven, he boarded at St. George's School in Harpenden, England. At age 15, Liebrandt considered becoming an officer in the British Army as his father had done. He moved out of his house in 1992 and began work as a commis chef at L'Escargot in London. In 1995 he was a commis chef at The Restaurant Marco Pierre White, at a time when White was the youngest chef to be awarded three Michelin stars. Liebrandt later went to work for Raymond Blanc's two Michelin star Le Manoir aux Quat' Saisons near Oxford, England., Then moved to Paris, France to work with Chef Pierre Gagnaire at his Three Michelin star restaurant. In 1999, Liebrandt moved to New York, where he worked as a sous chef at Bouley Bakery.

=== Atlas ===
In 2000, Liebrandt became executive chef at Atlas at 40 Central Park South, where at age 24, he was the youngest chef ever to earn a three star review from The New York Times. He quit over a disagreement with the owners about the menu at Atlas and went to work at the bistro Papillon.

=== Papillon ===
While at Papillon, Liebrandt earned a two-star rating from The New York Times. He also earned a reputation for eccentricity, in part for requiring diners to eat their prix fixe meals while bound and blindfolded. According to Liebrandt, it was the pastry chef's idea and only happened on two occasions.

Liebrandt quit the restaurant after a few months when it dropped his avant-garde menu in favour of "burgers and fries", in response to diners' post-9/11 preference for comfort food. He opened his consulting company the Veda Group and worked as a private chef for Prince Andrew and Lord Rothschild.

=== Gilt ===
Gilt opened in December 2005, in the former location of Le Cirque 2000, in the New York Palace Hotel. Liebrandt was recruited as Gilt's executive chef, allowing Liebrandt to create a menu that Thomas Keller characterised as a "light years" extension of his cooking. The restaurant received a two-star review from The New York Times.

=== Corton and The Elm ===
After leaving Gilt, Liebrandt freelanced for a short time before opening his Tribeca restaurant Corton In October 2008, Liebrandt opened Corton. Corton earned two stars in the 2009 New York City Michelin Guide. Liebrandt's elaborately imaginative food and "sometime outré" style were toned down slightly at Corton. Reservations at Corton often must have been made months in advance, and Liebrandt's cooking received ecstatic reviews. Corton closed in July 2013 when Chef Liebrandt left to open The Elm in the McCarren Hotel & Pool in Brooklyn. The Elm closed on 15 February 2015.

=== A Matter of Taste ===
Liebrandt starred in the Sally Rowe directed documentary film A Matter of Taste: Serving Up Paul Liebrandt. The film follows Liebrandt's New York career over the course of a decade, and premiered on HBO on 13 June 2011. The film was nominated for an Emmy for Best Cultural Programming in 2012.

Food writer Andrew Friedman started discussions in 2011 about writing a book which will be published by Clarkson Potter in 2013.

Liebrandt appeared as a guest judge on Season 15 of Top Chef.

== Awards ==
Liebrandt has received several awards and other recognition throughout his career.

- Youngest Three Star Chef, The New York Times, 2000
- The Best and the Brightest, Esquire, 2002
- Two Stars, Corton, Michelin Guide, 2009
- Best New Chef, Food and Wine, 2009

== See also ==
- David Bouley
- Francis Derby
- Molecular gastronomy
