= Drew Nieporent =

American restaurateur

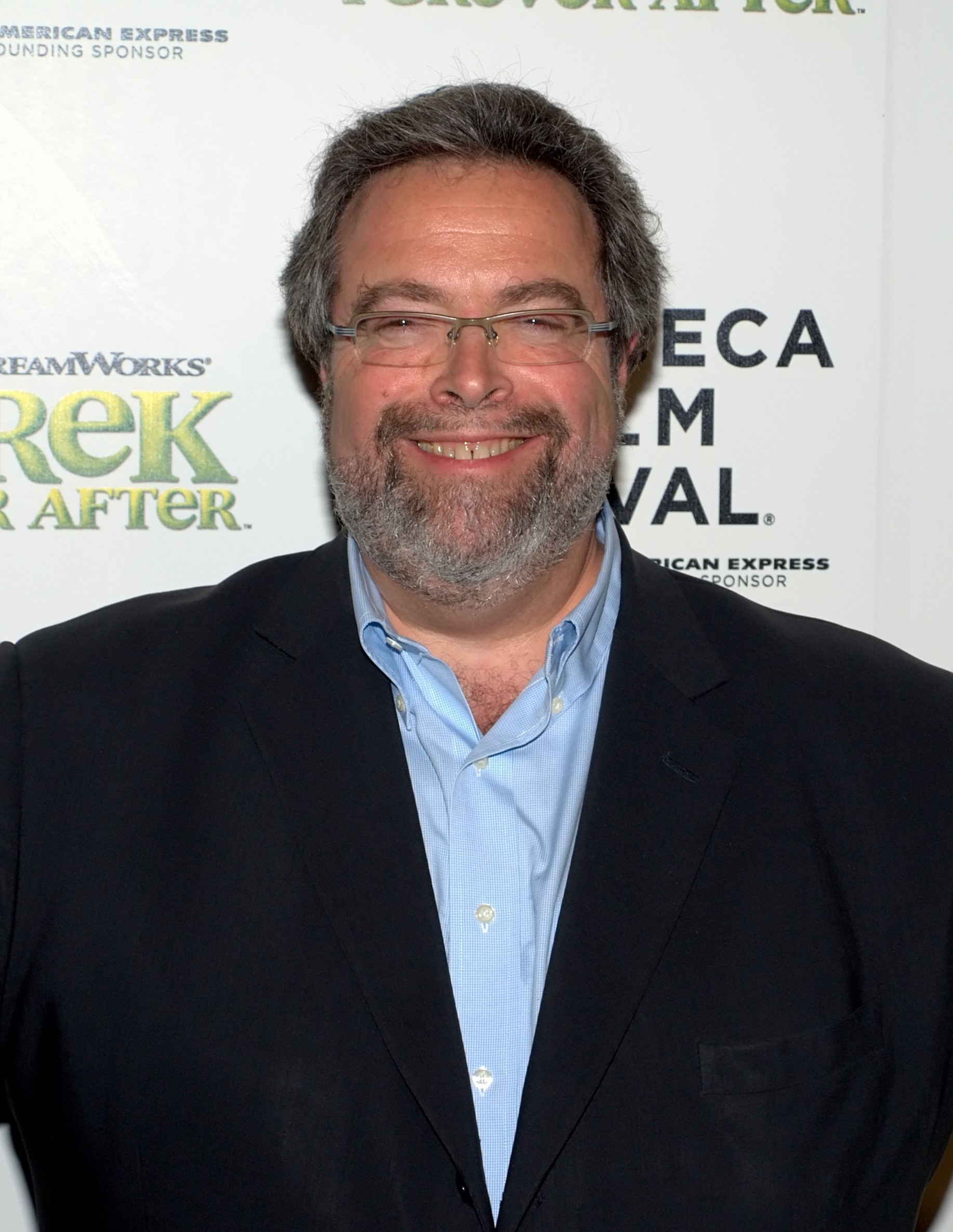
Nieporent at the 2010 Tribeca Film Festival.

Drew Nieporent is an American restaurateur based in New York City. He owns Myriad Restaurant Group, Nobu and Nobu London, which have earned him two Michelin stars.

== Career ==
Nieporent’s first restaurant, Montrachet opened in Tribeca in 1985. At the time, it earned three stars from The New York Times. In a 2004 New York Times review, Amanda Hesser gave Montrachet two stars and commented that "much of the cooking is textbook-correct, yet you will not be awed", while praising the wine list. In 2008, Montrachet reopened as Corton, with chef-partner Paul Liebrandt. The New York Times awarded Corton three stars, and the restaurant also received two Michelin stars.

In 1994, Nieporent co-founded Nobu with Robert De Niro and Nobu Matsuhisa. Nobu NYC, Next Door Nobu, and Nobu Fifty Seven each received three stars from The New York Times. The James Beard Foundation named Nobu NYC Best New Restaurant. The Nobu brand has since expanded to open hotels on several continents.

In 2002, Tribeca Grill joined Rubicon and Montrachet in receiving the Wine Spectator Grand Award. In 2005, Nieporent’s hospitality group, Myriad Restaurant Group, opened Crush Wine & Spirits.

Bâtard, which opened in 2014, won the James Beard Foundation Award for Best New Restaurant in 2014. The restaurant closed in 2023.
