= National Register of Historic Places listings in Colfax County, New Mexico =

Location of Colfax County in New Mexico

This is a list of the National Register of Historic Places listings in Colfax County, New Mexico.

This is intended to be a complete list of the properties and districts on the National Register of Historic Places in Colfax County, New Mexico, United States. Latitude and longitude coordinates are provided for many National Register properties and districts; these locations may be seen together in a map.

There are 30 properties and districts listed on the National Register in the county, including 2 National Historic Landmarks. All of the places within the county on the National Register are also listed on the State Register of Cultural Properties with the exception of the Folsom Site and Raton Pass National Historic Landmarks.

This National Park Service list is complete through NPS recent listings posted April 24, 2026.

Contents: NRHP in New Mexico by county
Bernalillo – Catron – Chaves – Cibola – Colfax – Curry – De Baca – Doña Ana – Eddy – Grant – Guadalupe – Harding – Hidalgo – Lea – Lincoln – Los Alamos – Luna – McKinley – Mora – Otero – Quay – Rio Arriba – Roosevelt – San Juan – San Miguel – Sandoval – Santa Fe – Sierra – Socorro – Taos – Torrance – Union – Valencia

== Current listings ==
	Name on the Register	Image	Date listed	Location	City or town	Description
1	Casa del Gavilan	Casa del Gavilan	December 7, 2017 (#100001882)	570 State Road 21, S., 5.7 miles (9.2 km) south of Cimarron; 36°26′19″N 104°57′25″W	Cimarron	
2	Catskill Charcoal Ovens		January 30, 1978 (#78001813)	35 miles (56 km) west of Raton; 36°56′07″N 104°46′36″W	Raton	
3	Cimarron Historic District	Cimarron Historic District	April 3, 1973 (#73001140)	Southern edge of city along State Road 21; 36°30′16″N 104°55′17″W	Cimarron	
4	Cimarron Mercantile	Cimarron Mercantile	June 13, 2019 (#100003458)	709 S. Collison St. 36°30′15″N 104°55′16″W	Cimarron	
5	Clifton House Site	Clifton House Site	April 7, 1995 (#94000325)	Address Restricted	Raton	
6	Colfax County Courthouse	Colfax County Courthouse	June 18, 1987 (#87000882)	3rd and Savage; 36°54′15″N 104°26′26″W	Raton	
7	Colfax County Courthouse in Springer	Colfax County Courthouse in Springer	December 7, 1987 (#87000883)	614 Maxwell Ave. 36°21′50″N 104°35′43″W	Springer	
8	Columbian School	Columbian School	March 15, 1996 (#96000261)	700 N. 2nd St. 36°54′36″N 104°26′13″W	Raton	
9	R.H. Cowan Livery Stable	R.H. Cowan Livery Stable	August 3, 1979 (#79001538)	220 Maxwell Ave. 36°21′34″N 104°35′41″W	Springer	
10	Dawson Cemetery	Dawson Cemetery	April 9, 1992 (#92000249)	Approximately 4 miles northwest of the junction of U.S. Route 64 and the Dawson Rd. 36°39′19″N 104°46′02″W	Dawson	
11	Dorsey Mansion		September 4, 1970 (#70000399)	About 12 miles northeast of Abbott off U.S. Route 56; 36°29′12″N 104°11′28″W	Abbott	
12	Eagle Nest Dam	Eagle Nest Dam	April 18, 1979 (#79001537)	3 miles southeast of Eagle Nest off U.S. Route 64; 36°31′54″N 105°13′44″W	Eagle Nest	
13	El Raton Theater	El Raton Theater	January 17, 2007 (#06001250)	115 N. 2nd St. 36°54′15″N 104°26′21″W	Raton	
14	El Vado de las Piedras and the Santa Fe Trail-Colfax County Trail Segments		April 21, 1994 (#94000327)	1.5 miles south of U.S. Route 56 at the Canadian River; 36°18′10″N 104°29′21″W	Springer	
15	Folsom Site	Folsom Site	October 15, 1966 (#66000473)	Address Restricted	Folsom	
16	Immanuel Lutheran Church	Immanuel Lutheran Church	February 23, 2015 (#15000026)	307 Summit Ave. 36°21′36″N 104°35′31″W	Springer	
17	Kearny School	Kearny School	March 15, 1996 (#96000259)	800 S. 3rd St. 36°53′42″N 104°26′32″W	Raton	
18	Longfellow School	Longfellow School	March 15, 1996 (#96000262)	700 E. 4th St. 36°53′53″N 104°26′04″W	Raton	
19	Maxwell-Abreu and North (Martinez) Houses	Maxwell-Abreu and North (Martinez) Houses	June 23, 1993 (#93000253)	Northwestern corner of the junction of State Road 121 and Rayado Creek; 36°22′04″N 104°55′49″W	Cimarron	
20	Mills House	Mills House	October 6, 1970 (#70000400)	509 1st St. 36°21′26″N 104°35′30″W	Springer	
21	Original Townsite Historic District	Original Townsite Historic District	March 27, 2008 (#08000230)	Roughly bounded by Clark and Cimmaron Aves. and S. 2nd and S. 7th Sts. 36°53′58″N 104°26′37″W	Raton	
22	Point of Rocks Historic District		April 21, 1994 (#94000328)	Jones Well Rd., 1.5 miles east of Point of Rocks Rd. 36°25′19″N 104°09′32″W	Springer	
23	Raton Armory	Raton Armory	March 15, 1996 (#96000260)	901 S. 3rd St. 36°53′33″N 104°26′33″W	Raton	
24	Raton Downtown Historic District	Raton Downtown Historic District	October 21, 1977 (#77000923)	Roughly bounded by Rio Grande, Clark, 1st and 3rd Sts.; also roughly bounded by 3rd St., Apache & Parsons Aves. 36°53′58″N 104°26′21″W	Raton	Second set of addresses represents a boundary increase April 30, 2015.
25	Raton Junior-Senior High School	Raton Junior-Senior High School	March 15, 1996 (#96000263)	500 S. 3rd St. 36°53′51″N 104°26′31″W	Raton	
26	Raton Pass	Raton Pass	October 15, 1966 (#66000474)	U.S. Routes 85/87 on the Colorado/New Mexico border 36°59′19″N 104°29′11″W	Raton	
27	Raton Pass Scenic Highway	Raton Pass Scenic Highway	September 17, 2015 (#15000605)	Roughly from .1 mi. from jct. of Hill St. & Moulton Ave. continuing approx. 1.5 mi. on Scenic Hwy. 36°54′12″N 104°26′56″W	Raton	
28	The Ring Place		July 19, 1988 (#88001054)	Questa Ranger District in the Carson National Forest, Forest Rds. 1950 and 1918A; 36°46′21″N 105°07′16″W	Cimarron	
29	St. John's Methodist Episcopal Church	St. John's Methodist Episcopal Church	January 18, 1978 (#78001814)	17 miles (27 km) east of Raton on State Road 72 and Johnson Mesa; 36°54′52″N 104°12′18″W	Raton	
30	Villa Philmonte Historic District	Villa Philmonte Historic District	August 18, 1995 (#95001018)	Philmont Scout Ranch; 36°27′33″N 104°56′56″W	Cimarron	

== See also ==
- List of National Historic Landmarks in New Mexico
- National Register of Historic Places listings in New Mexico
