= Colfax County Courthouse =

Colfax County Courthouse may refer to:

- Colfax County Courthouse (Nebraska), Schuyler, Nebraska
- Colfax County Courthouse (Raton, New Mexico), current facility in Raton, New Mexico
- Colfax County Courthouse (Springer, New Mexico), a former courthouse
- Colfax County Courthouse, a building in the Cimarron Historic District, Cimarron, New Mexico
