= Colfax County Courthouse (Raton, New Mexico) =

- U.S. National Register of Historic Places
- NM State Register of Cultural Properties
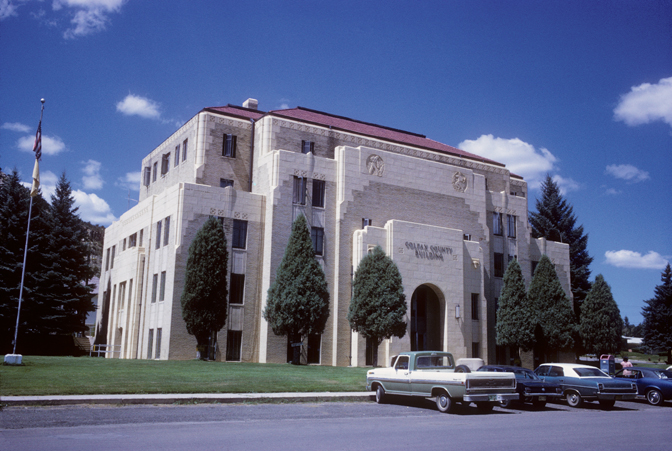

- Location within New Mexico
- Location: Third St. and Savage Ave. Raton, New Mexico
- Coordinates: 36°54′15″N 104°26′26″W
- Area: 2.5 acres (1.0 ha)
- Built: 1936
- Architect: Townes & Funk; R.W. Vorhees
- Architectural style: Art Deco
- MPS: County Courthouses of New Mexico TR
- NRHP reference No.: 87000882
- NMSRCP No.: 1273

Significant dates
- Added to NRHP: June 18, 1987
- Designated NMSRCP: May 9, 1986

The Colfax County Courthouse is a building listed on the National Register of Historic Places. The courthouse is located at 230 North 3rd Street in Raton, New Mexico, United States.

The courthouse, built in 1936, is a five-story blond, brick building with a hipped tile roof on the top story and flat roofs on the lower portions. The building has glazed tile cornices and bas relief metal panels. The larger bar reliefs have scenes of farming, mining, and cattle ranching, which were the main industries in Colfax County. Some of the smaller motifs show the cattle brands from Colfax County. Some of the other architectural features include terrazzo floors, tile wainscoting, chipped-tile roof on the top story roof and flat roofs on lower areas.

A new legislative building, completed in 2010 in the south end of Raton, will carry out additional courthouse proceedings when the 1936 courthouse cannot contain them. It is unknown if the new courthouse will fully replace the 1936 courthouse in all legislative duties in the future. This new building now houses both the District and Magistrate Courts and the historic building is not used for court purposes.

== See also ==
- Cimarron Historic District (Second Colfax County Courthouse)
- Colfax County Courthouse (Springer, New Mexico)
- National Register of Historic Places listings in Colfax County, New Mexico
