= Mills House (Springer, New Mexico) =

Historic house in New Mexico, United States

- U.S. National Register of Historic Places
- NM State Register of Cultural Properties
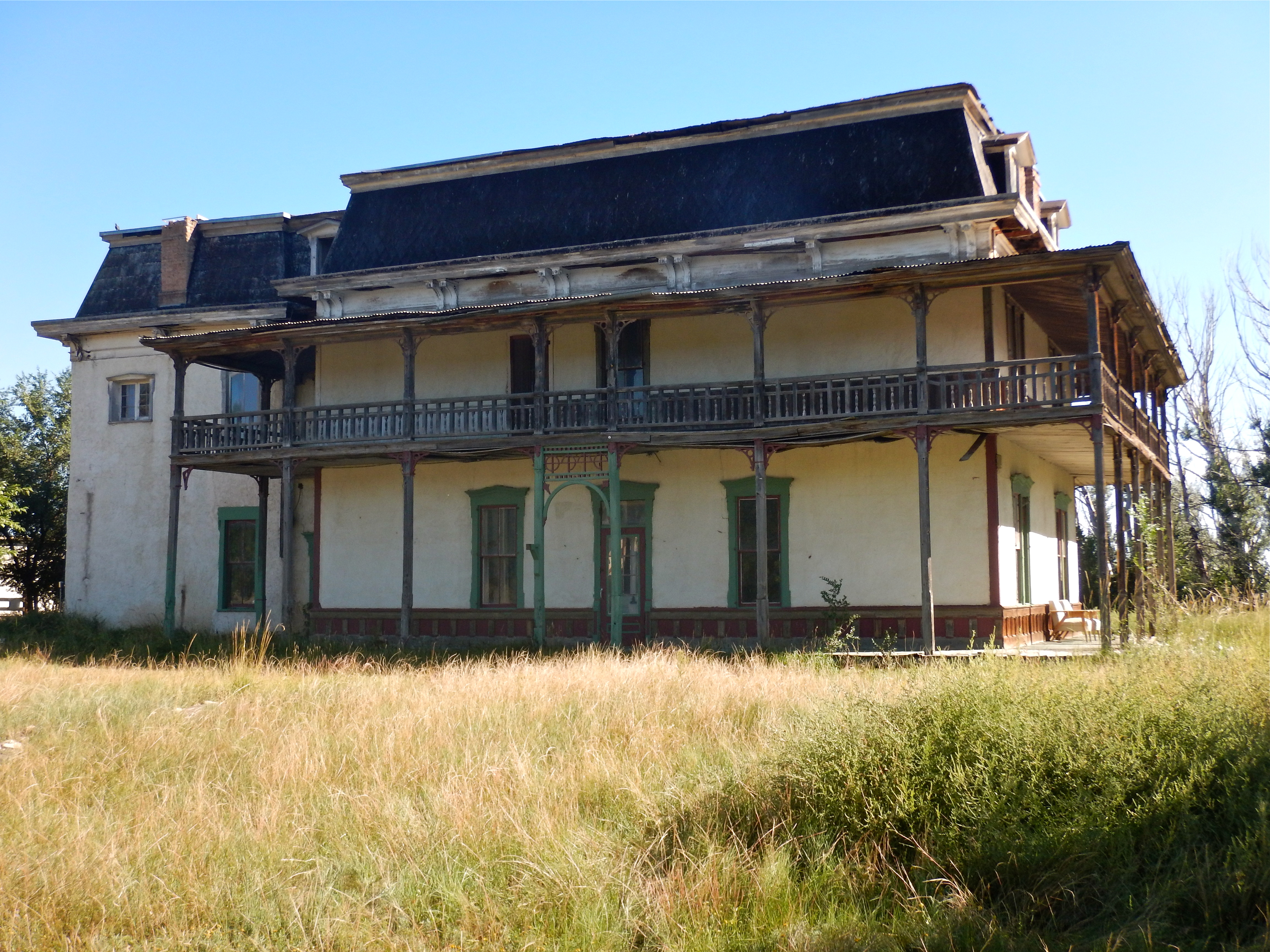

- Location within New Mexico
- Location: 509 1st St., Springer, New Mexico
- Coordinates: 36°21′26″N 104°35′30″W
- Area: 0.5 acres (0.20 ha)
- Built: 1877
- Architectural style: Greek Revival, French Academic
- NRHP reference No.: (%d+) (increase) (%d+) (decrease)
- NMSRCP No.: 191

Significant dates
- Added to NRHP: October 6, 1970
- Designated NMSRCP: May 22, 1970

Mills House is a house in Springer, New Mexico, in Colfax County, New Mexico, that was built in 1877. It was listed on the U.S. National Register of Historic Places in 1970. The locals have dubbed it the "Clegg Mansion”, after Luke and Myrtle Clegg who owned and lived in the house for several decades beginning in about 1915.

The original owner, Melvin Whitson Mills, was an attorney, politician, and businessman who was one of the founders of Springer NM. He needed a home large enough for him and his wife, his parents, and five adopted children. Mills lost the house and land as a result of bankruptcy in 1905.

It is a three-story 32-room adobe house on a rise near Cimarron Creek on the edge of Springer. It is made of adobe, has a metal mansard roof with four chimneys protruding above.

== See also ==
- National Register of Historic Places listings in Colfax County, New Mexico
