= New Mexico State Road 193 =

State highway in New Mexico, United States

State Road 193

Route information
- Maintained by NMDOT
- Length: 42.200 mi (67.914 km)

Major junctions
- South end: US 56 / US 412 near Springer
- North end: US 64 / US 87 near Raton

Location
- Country: United States
- State: New Mexico
- Counties: Colfax

Highway system
- New Mexico State Highway System; Interstate; US; State; Scenic
← NM 192	→ NM 194

State Road 193 (NM 193) is a 42.2-mile-long (67.9 km) state highway in the US state of New Mexico. NM 193's southern terminus is at U.S. Route 56 (US 56) east of Springer, and the northern terminus is at US 64/US 87 east of Raton. A 12.8-mile portion of it is surfaced with gravel.

== Major intersections ==
The entire route is in Colfax County.

Location	mi	km	Destinations	Notes
	0.000	0.000	US 56 / US 412	Southern terminus
	42.200	67.914	US 64 / US 87	Northern terminus
1.000 mi = 1.609 km; 1.000 km = 0.621 mi
