= Lillian Griggs =

North Carolina librarian

Lillian Baker Griggs was the first trained librarian to work in North Carolina, shaping both public and academic libraries in the state. She was Durham's library director from 1911-1923, updating the library system and establishing outreach programs. She organized and secured one of the first bookmobile services in the South, extending library service to rural North Carolinians. Griggs also worked as the director of the North Carolina Library Commission (now called the State Library Commission) from 1923-1930, after which she notably took the position as founding librarian of Duke University's Women's College from 1930-1949. She was president of the North Carolina Library Association and the Southeastern Library Association for multiple terms.

== Early life ==
Griggs was born on January 8, 1876, in Anderson, South Carolina. Her mother, Cora Wilhite Baker, died when she was four years old and her father, William Baker, was unable to care for Griggs and her infant brother. As a result, Griggs’ maternal grandparents took them in. Her grandfather, Dr. P. A. Wilhite, was an accomplished physician, standing as a member of the South Carolina State Board of Health for many years (notably as the Chairman of the Committee on Sale of Drugs and Medicines).

In the winter of 1884, Grigg’s grandfather bought an orange grove in Jacksonville, Florida. Griggs reportedly spent much of her childhood traveling south to Florida for the temperate winters, until her grandmother became blind from underlying health issues and traveling became impossible for the family.

As a young girl, Griggs had an irregular and spotty education, mostly undertaken at home by her grandmother and an aunt. When she turned 12 in 1888, she attended Nora Hubbard’s School. When she was done with her preliminary schooling, Griggs attended Williamston Female College (15 miles away from her hometown) and graduated in two years. Griggs has said that the curriculum was “most unorthodox,” with six weeks being given to a singular subject. She wrote in her unpublished memoir that the coursework was “delightful” when it was a humanities subject, but that she “always had a miserable six weeks when math was the subject.”

In the autumn of 1892, Griggs entered the Agnes Scott Institute, attending for 3 years and graduating in 1895.

== Pre-career ==
On Thanksgiving Day, 1892, Griggs attended an Auburn-Georgia Tech Football game in Atlanta, GA with her father. While there, she met Alfred Flourney Griggs through a family friend. Alfred Griggs was a junior at Atlanta Medical School at the time.

A few years later, Griggs visited Oxford, GA to attend her brother’s commencement ceremony at Emory Academy (Emory University). While staying at a friend's house, Alfred Griggs sought out Griggs to disprove a rumor that she was engaged. Allegedly, the (false) rumor had “disturbed” Alfred, so much so that he had taken the morning train to Oxford and returned to Atlanta that night “with the result that [...] [Lillian Griggs] had promised to marry him.” The two were married on April 21, 1897, in Anderson, South Carolina.

Grigg’s father initially opposed the marriage, as he wanted her to be a teacher. He had also heard the Griggs family was undesirable. Reflecting on this in the 1940s, Griggs believed that this was an unjust accusation. She stated they were a respectable southern family and had been “wealthy land and slave owners” for generations. Alfred’s father, Dr. Asa Wesley Griggs, had been a confederate surgeon in 1861, serving in the thirty-third Alabama Regiment. Griggs notes the family’s cook, Aunt Ruth, who made their wedding cake, had been enslaved by the family as a girl.

Griggs and her husband lived in West Point, Georgia for 18 months. In this time, they had a daughter, who passed away 5 months later. The couple moved to Atlanta shortly after to develop Alfred’s doctor practice. There, Lillian gave birth to a son, Alfred Jr, on July 16, 1899. Alfred had little success in Atlanta, and after he spent a short spell studying in New York, the whole family moved to Birmingham, Alabama. In August of 1903, Lillian gave birth to her daughter, Imogen. Tragically, the girl died of illness in March of 1905. Griggs wrote later that her death led to the “ending of the happiest period of my life.” Soon after the death, in the winter of 1905, Alfred Griggs developed tuberculosis after a life-threatening case of the flu. Adding to Griggs’ stress, her father developed ocular cancer.

The Griggs decided that the best course of action would be to move to the Southwest in hopes that the drier weather would positively impact Alfred’s condition. Alfred Griggs left prior to Lillian and their son, who stayed behind to care for her dying father. Three weeks later, William Baker died in July of 1905. Griggs and her son then followed Alfred to Raton, New Mexico. Over the course of the next three years, the family would move from New Mexico to Colorado Springs, Colorado, and later Reno, Nevada as they searched for a place for Alfred to convalesce and successfully open another practice. While in Reno, Lillian taught Sunday school at a local Methodist church, and Alfred opened an office with Dr. M.A. Roberson.

On November 8, 1908, Alfred suffered a severe blood hemorrhage in his heart. He died in Lillian’s arms.

== Library certification ==
As Griggs had become accustomed to a life as the wife of a doctor, Alfred’s death left her in a precarious situation. She wrote in her memoir, “Just what we would do was most uncertain. It would be necessary for me to get employment of some kind. But what could I do? I was not prepared for anything special, we had no income or money, and the years ahead seemed very dismal.”

Traveling back to Georgia with her nine-year-old son, Griggs was counseled by a family friend to consider applying for a librarian position. She initially dismissed it as pointless, given that she had no connections in the field. However, in the summer of 1910, she saw an ad for the “Library School of the Carnegie Library in Atlanta” in the morning newspaper and decided to apply. Griggs took the exam, and was admitted to the program at the Carnegie Library in Atlanta (later integrated with Emory University) for the following fall semester. While completing her year-long certification, Griggs lived in Atlanta with a friend while her late husband’s sister cared for her son. Griggs received her librarian certificate in the spring of 1911.

== Durham Public Library (1911-1923) ==
Griggs became the first professionally trained librarian to work in North Carolina on July 1, 1911, taking a position as the director of the Durham County Public Library. Before she filled this role, the library had been staffed by volunteers. As the Library Board had no previous experience working with a professional librarian, they allowed Griggs complete freedom in updating and improving Durham’s dysfunctional library—a responsibility not often given to female librarians in this time period.

Within the first four years of working at the Durham Public Library, Griggs completely upended the library. She catalogued and classified the entire collection of material (3,500 books and periodicals) and established a children’s room with regular story time hours. Mena Webb, an NC author, recalls Grigg’s presence in the library in a 2007 interview with the Southern Oral History Program: “Because my mother was a good friend of the librarian, she knew that I would be safe over there... [...] Mrs. Griggs would keep me out of trouble. So I was a frequent visitor over there at the library. She was very helpful to me, Mrs. Griggs. She picked out books at first for me and then she gave me free rein.”

Griggs also organized the library’s budget, prepared statistical reports, and in 1914 convinced the municipal assembly to double the funds allocated for library use. She also assisted Dr. Aaron McDuffie Moore in setting up Durham’s African American public library, first housed in the basement of White Rock Baptist Church, but the extent of her participation is unclear. In 1918, Griggs and the library board won a $32,000 grant from the Carnegie Foundation that led to the construction of a new Durham Public Library in 1921. The library was housed there for the next five decades.

=== Library service for rural communities ===
Accessing library materials was difficult for North Carolinians who lived outside of major cities at this time. Concerned about this issue, Griggs organized various library branches in Durham’s mill district as well as within the city’s high school. She also personally loaned books to residents who could not access library services. In particular, Griggs found that people working late into the night in tobacco curing sheds were starved for intellectual stimulation and reading material. Griggs felt strongly that residents of rural areas, when given the opportunity to utilize library services, quickly took advantage of them.

In October of 1923, the Durham Public Library began to utilize a bookmobile service to serve rural communities. The bookmobile, a converted blue Ford truck named Miss Kiwanis, transported up to 600 books at a time to Durham County schools. Miss Kiwanis delivered to exclusively white schools, as the Durham Public Library was segregated until the late 1960s. The bookmobile was made possible by Grigg's involvement, in which she lobbied for the Kiwanis Club to provide the funds and a vehicle for Durham's public. The bookmobile was the first in North Carolina and an early example of libraries extending their reach from traditional stationary locations in the South.

== WWI service ==
The American Library Association (ALA) was one of several national agencies to provide book services for the armed forces in the first World War. Griggs attended the conference (focused on planning libraries for the military) in Saratoga Springs, NY, in July, 1918 as the North Carolina representative. There, she registered for war service. Back in North Carolina, Griggs, who was the North Carolina Library Association President at the time, canceled the 1918 yearly conference, calling for librarians of the state to assist and promote efforts in collecting books for soldiers overseas.

Reportedly, Griggs did not think she would get a military assignment as she was a librarian of a small library. However, in September of 1918, she received a telegram with orders to report to New Orleans to act as a supervisor of book services at Coast Guard and Naval Stations on the Gulf Coast. She worked for 5 months in this role, traveling to stations up and down the coast, ranging from Mobile, AL to Morgan City, LA. Griggs was unable to make serious progress with the project before the war ended in November 1918, and began deconstructing the libraries in anticipation of her return to North Carolina.

In January of 1919, before Griggs could return to Durham, she received a telegram from the ALA with instructions to report to the Library of Congress for deployment overseas on February 25th. When she arrived at the ALA headquarters in Paris, France in early March for the Army of Occupation, she was assigned to the Third Army in Koblenz, Germany. The ALA had sent approximately 275,000 volumes for military use, and Grigg's work primarily centered on fulfilling mail-order requests and supplying local hospitals with reading materials for patients.

In September of 1919, Griggs began to prepare to go home. At this point, the army was virtually gone, and there were very few Americans in the area. Grigg’s final task included calling in all the books and sorting them. Suitable books were kept in a library that operated for the few soldiers in the area. When all the soldiers eventually left Koblentz, the remaining books were transported back to the ALA library in Paris. Griggs wrote that she left behind a “beautiful library” in Koblenz, located in the German Officer’s Club on the Rizzi Strasse.

On her military service, Griggs later wrote that it was a "great experience, one that I enjoyed and shall always remember with pleasure.”

== North Carolina Library Commission (1923-1930) ==
After her time in Germany, Griggs continued serving the Durham community at the Durham Public Library until 1923. In November of 1923, the North Carolina Library Commission (now called the State Library Commission) unanimously appointed her as director of the organization. In this role until 1930, Griggs traveled around the state to a variety of towns, performing duties such as meeting with county commissioners and boards of education to discuss library budgets and increase funding, as well as giving public talks on library affairs. She also utilized the Durham bookmobile, Miss Kwansis, to drive around the state to promote library access and awareness.

== Duke University's Women’s College Library (1930-1949) ==
Griggs accepted the position of head librarian for Duke University's Women's College, which was scheduled to open in September 1930. It was at this point that her career shifted to academic librarianship, and she would work to support undergraduates at the Women's College library at Duke University for the next 19 years.

Griggs was instrumental in the founding, planning, and curation of the Women's College Library. She developed the library and staff with extreme care and continuously updated the collections to maintain relevancy. It is recorded that by the end of the first year over 7,000 books were indexed at the Women's College. By four years there were over 20,000 volumes catalogued, and by 1949 there were nearly 80,000 books and materials held within Grigg's library.

Griggs held the viewpoint that it was the women's library's job to outfit students with all the material they could possibly need for their studies (an attitude that reflected her education within independent women's colleges rather than the interrelated development of Duke University). Given this, Griggs included an array of books in the library collection, such as curriculum-based textbooks and classic literature traditionally found within men's colleges. In addition, she also included material relevant to fashionable women's interests and needs. The inclusion of books on art, home maintenance, social etiquette and children's development displays Grigg's attentiveness to popular book trends of the era. It also works to inform modern historians on socio-cultural attitudes and gender politics in this period.

Grigg had a progressive attitude on how students should interact with their campus libraries in comparison to contemporary institutional standards of the time. She held the view that, especially at universities, "books should come to mean to young people not only textbooks [...] but also sources of delight and provocative information which are a pleasure to seek." Grigg's emphasis on making academic libraries accessible to students was clearly a page taken from her time within the public library world; by prioritizing young adult's interests in books, it is evident that she hoped they would continue to utilize library services throughout their lives.

=== Browsing room and opening library stacks ===
A particularly significant innovation that Griggs made with the Women's College library is her implementation of a browsing room as well as her choice to open the stacks for wider undergraduate use. Before the 1930s, it was a common convention within academic libraries to keep the stacks under lock and key, forbidding students to freely browse material. This standard was established to prevent theft and thoroughly manage control of the collections. Common areas with space to read were similarly uncommon, with only a few other browsing rooms available in academic libraries across the nation (Harvard University's Farnsworth Room being one example).

However, in a controversial move at the time, Griggs set up a room for browsing and fully opened the stacks to the entire campus community. This was to enable students to have access to material not directly related to their classes, as Griggs believed it was more important to inspire students than to worry about potential losses. Her goal was to curate a space where female students could comfortably peruse books in the new college.

Calling her room "The Booklovers Room," Griggs furnished the space with comfortable, plush furniture and displayed appealing books to invite readers in. Hoping to garner community within the fledgling Women's College, she also utilized the Booklover's Room to hold events for students and faculty.

In the same year of the Women's College's opening, Duke University also obtained on loan a large collection of art, ranging from paintings to sculptures. The collection was put on display at the Women's Library in the Booklover's Room, essentially becoming the University's first art museum. As courses on art were added to the class roster the next year, it became evident to Griggs that further material on art for undergraduates was needed to support the fledgling art department. With a grant from the Carnegie Corporation, she bought 200 books and 2,000 mounted prints. This garnered support for the browsing room and enabled Griggs to obtain an extra $1000 in funds to expand the library's collection of art books, which became a standout in the Southeast.

As libraries began to play a more prominent role within campuses across the nation, Griggs' commitment to providing an exemplary library experience for undergraduate students helped shape the foundation of modern academic librarianship.

She retired from Duke University in 1949.

== Leadership and professional organizations ==
Throughout Grigg’s career as a public and academic librarian, she was involved with many professional organizations. Within the North Carolina Library Association (NCLA), Griggs served as the chairman of the public Library section (1913), treasurer (1913-1916), and president (1917-1918, 1933-1934). She was additionally elected president of the League of Library Commissioners (1929-1930), president of the State Association of Librarians (1931), and president of the Southeastern Library Association (1933-34).

== Death ==
Lillian Griggs died on April 11, 1955 at 79 years old. She was buried at the Elmwood Cemetery in Birmingham, Alabama, next to her late husband.
