= Miami, New Mexico =

- Unincorporated community
- Location within the state of New Mexico Miami (the United States)
- Coordinates: 36°21′00″N 104°47′35″W
- Country: United States
- State: New Mexico
- County: Colfax
- Elevation: 6,195 ft (1,888 m)
- Time zone: UTC-7 (Mountain (MST))
  - Summer (DST): UTC-6 (MDT)
- ZIP code: 87729
- Area code: 575
- GNIS feature ID: 891928

Miami is an unincorporated community in Colfax County, New Mexico, United States.

Miami lies on State Road 21 and is between Springer and Sunny Side. The community includes approximately six homes and eight ranches.

Miami is about 8 miles (13 km) southeast of the Philmont Scout Ranch base camp, but is only about 4 miles (6.4 km) from the Rayado campsite.

Miami was named by its founders after Miami, Ohio and was originally called Miami Ranch. Miami Lake, a private man-made reservoir, located just off State Road 21, six miles (10 km) due west of the community, was part of the Miami Project of the Farmers Development Company which purchased 20,000 acres (81 km^{2}) in the area in 1906.

NFL player Jack Robinson was born in Miami.

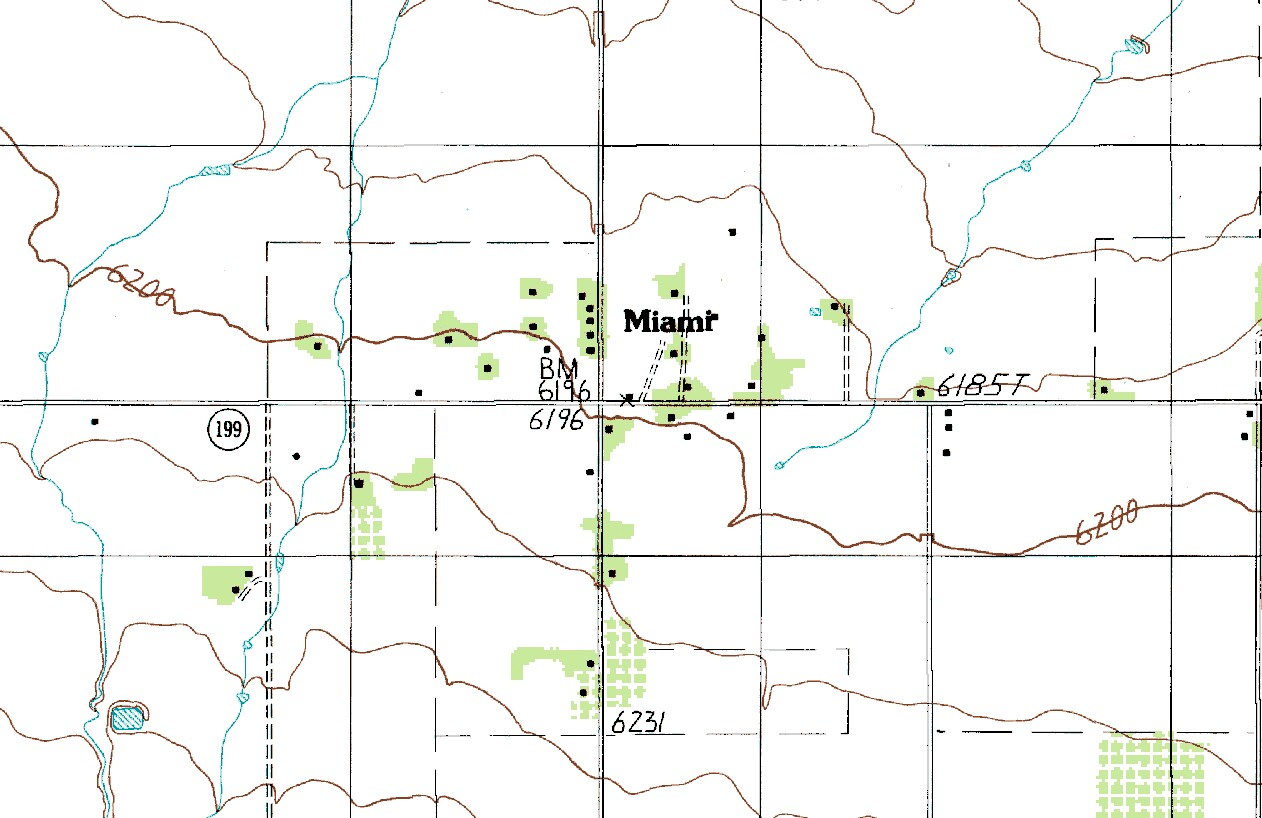
Topographic map of Miami, NM, showing individual buildings
