= Raton Downtown Historic District =

Historic district in New Mexico, United States

- U.S. National Register of Historic Places
- U.S. Historic district
- NM State Register of Cultural Properties
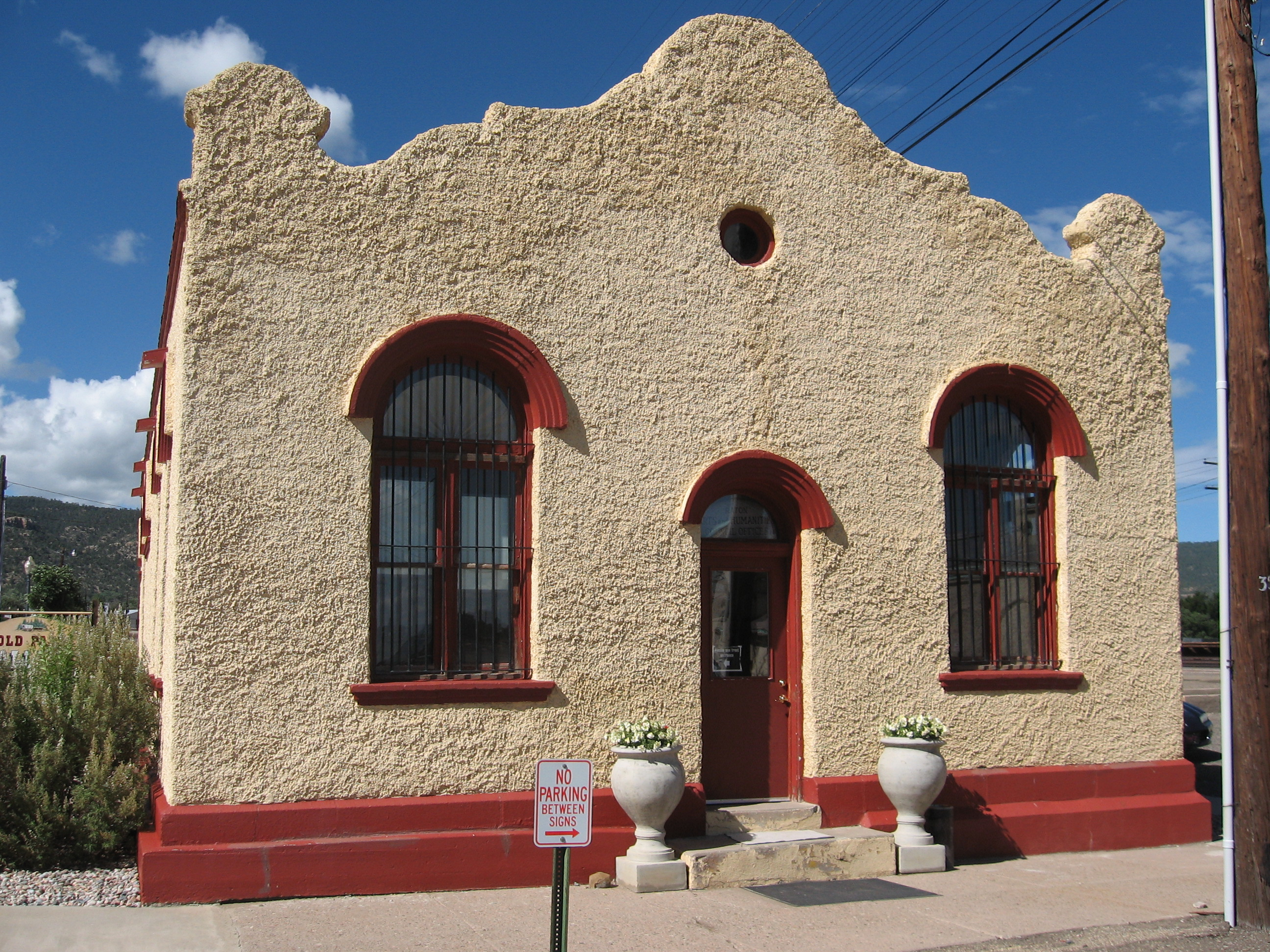
- Wells Fargo Express Company Office

- Location within New Mexico
- Location: Raton, New Mexico
- Coordinates: 36°53′58″N 104°26′21″W
- Area: 200 acres (81 ha)
- Built: 1878
- Architectural style: Classical Revival, Spanish Colonial Revival
- NRHP reference No.: 77000923 (original); 14000897 (increase)
- NMSRCP No.: 470 (original); 2004 (increase)

Significant dates
- Added to NRHP: October 21, 1977
- Boundary increase: April 30, 2015
- Designated NMSRCP: August 27, 1976 (original); August 8, 2014 (increase)

The Raton Downtown Historic District is a historic district listed on the National Register of Historic Places in Raton, New Mexico, USA. The district, when first listed in 1977, is bounded on the north by Clark Avenue and on the south by Rio Grande Avenue. On the east, the district is bounded by First Street, and on the west the district is bounded by Third Street. The district covers about 200 acres (81 ha) and contains 95 significant buildings. The district was enlarged in 2015.

== Notable buildings ==
Twenty-seven of the buildings are listed on a walking tour published by the Raton Visitors Bureau:

1. Raton (Amtrak station) built by the Atchison, Topeka and Santa Fe Railroad in 1903. Located at 201 South First Street.
2. Wells Fargo Express Company (1910). Located at 145 South First Street. Now the Old Pass Gallery and offices of the Raton Arts and Humanities Council.
3. Reading Room built for Atchison, Topeka and Santa Fe Railroad employees in 1922. "For years a reading-room and library system was maintained along the (Santa Fe) line"
4. Cook's Hall. Built in the late 1880s. Located at 140-144 South First Street. Listed on the State Register 2-25-1977.
5. Roth Building (1893). Located at 134 South First Street. Listed on the State Register 2-25-1977.
6. Abourezk Building (1906). Located at 132 South First Street.
7. Marchiondo Building (1882). Located at 120-124 First Street. Also known as the New York and Golden Rule Stores. Listed on the State Register 11-04-1977.
8. Joseph Building, dating from the 1890s. Located at 100 South First Street. Listed on the State Register 8-27-1976.
9. Home Ranch Saloon (1884). Located at 132 North First Street.
10. Investment Block (1896). Located at 136-144 North First Street. Listed on the State Register 2-25-1977.
11. Labadie House (1880). Located on the south side of Savage Avenue between North First and North Second Streets. This is one of the oldest dwellings in town.
12. Ripley Park. Located on north side of Savage Avenue between North First Street and North Second Street. Named for Edward Payson Ripley, President of Atchison, Topeka, and Santa Fe Railroad. The 2-acre (0.81 ha) park contains a monumental relic of the USS Maine and a DAR monument commemorating the Mountain Branch of the Santa Fe Trail.
13. Shuler Theater (1915). Located at 131 North Second Street. This building was originally built to house an opera house, the fire station, and city offices. It was named for James Jackson Shuler, a medical doctor who was mayor of Raton from 1899–1902 and 1910-1919. The lobby of the theater contains WPA murals of local history painted by artist Manville Chapman. Listed on the State Register 3-20-1970.
14. Foote Hotel (1901). Located at 136 North Second Street.
15. Odd Fellows Building (1901). Located at 128-130 North Second Street.
16. A.H. Carey Hardware Store (1882). Located at 112 North Second Street.
17. Seaburg European Hotel (1914). 101 North Third Street. When this hotel was built, it was the largest hotel in New Mexico with 400 rooms. Now the El Portal Hotel.
18. Roth Block (1905). Located at 132 North First Street. Now the home of Solano's Boot and Western Wear.
19. Raton Realty Building (1928). Located at 137 South Second Street.
20. DiLislo Building (1918). Located at 144 South Second Street.
21. US Post Office (1917). Located at 244 Cook Avenue. Now the Arthur Johnson Library. The WPA murals from this former post office have been moved to the US Post Office (1962) located immediately north of the old Post Office at 245 Park Avenue East. The library has an important collection of local art.
22. The Swastika Hotel (1929). 200 South Second Street. Now the home of International Bank. Listed on the State Register 10-31-1980.
23. Palace Hotel (1896). Located on the southwest corner of South First Street and Cook Avenue. Listed on the State Register 8-27-1976.
24. Haven Hotel (1913). Located in the 200 block of South First Street. Listed on the State Register 8-27-1976.
25. Coors Building, a warehouse erected by Coors Brewing Company in 1906. Located at 216 South First Street. Listed on the State Register 8-27-1976.
26. Raton Hotel and Corner Bar, around 1910. Located at 244 South First Street. Listed on the State Register 2-25-1977.
27. Ilfield Building. Located at 329 South First Street.

In addition to these buildings, other significant structures in the downtown include:

- El Raton Theater (1930). Located at 115 North Second Street. The exterior resembles a Scottish castle.
- Raton Fire Station. Located at 127 Clark Avenue. The exterior is Art Deco.

Several other buildings are on the south side of the Raton Downtown Historic District, but were not included in the Walking Tour. They are listed from the railroad tracks going west on Rio Grande Avenue:

- Santa Fe Freight House (1903). Across First Street from the Senior Center. Now renovated and used as part of the Senior Center.
- Raton Senior Center. Located at 440 South First Street in an old building.
- Scouting Museum of New Mexico. Located at 400 South First Street in an old building.
- Raton Lodge Number 86 (1911). Located at 300 South Second Street. The oldest standing Elks lodge in New Mexico.
- Heart's Desire Bed and Breakfast (1885). Located at 301 South Third Street. A four bedroom bed and breakfast in a Victorian style mansion.
- Holy Trinity Episcopal Church (1921). Located at 240 Rio Grande Avenue.

== See also ==
- National Register of Historic Places listings in Colfax County, New Mexico
