= Raton station =

Train station in Raton, New Mexico, U.S.

Raton, NM
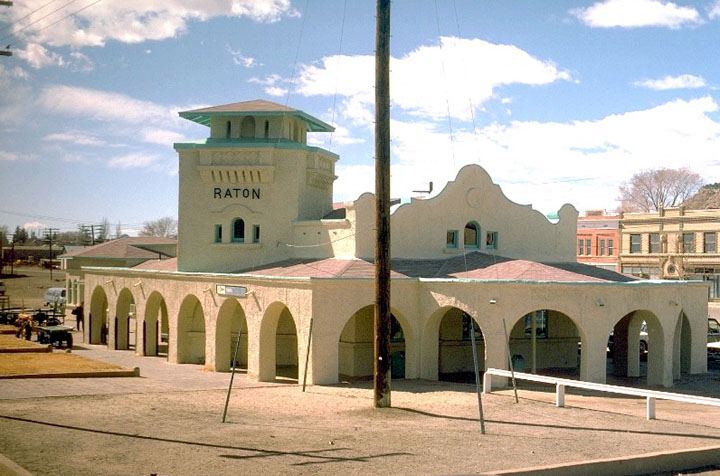

General information
- Location: 201 South First Street; Raton, New Mexico
- Coordinates: 36.9010°N 104.4378°W
- Elevation: 6,750 feet (2,060 m)
- Owner: BNSF Railway
- Line: BNSF Raton Subdivision
- Platforms: 1 side platform
- Tracks: 2
- Connections: Amtrak Thruway

Other information
- Station code: Amtrak: RAT

History
- Opened: July 4, 1879
- Rebuilt: May 7, 1903–January 4, 1904
- Former names: Otero (1879–1880)

Key dates
- January 1904: Former station demolished

Passengers
- FY 2025: 9,171 (Amtrak)

Services
| Preceding station | Amtrak | Following station |
|---|---|---|
| Las Vegas toward Los Angeles | Southwest Chief | Trinidad toward Chicago |
Former services
| Preceding station | Atchison, Topeka and Santa Fe Railway | Following station |
|---|---|---|
| Dillon toward Los Angeles | Main Line | Lynn toward Chicago |
Location

Raton is an active railroad station in the city of Raton, Colfax County, New Mexico, United States. Located at 201 South First Street, the station serves Amtrak's Southwest Chief. Connections are also available to Denver, Colorado via Amtrak Thruway bus service. The station is staffed during the summer season when tourism for the Philmont Scout Ranch and the NRA Whittington Center shooting complex is at its peak. During off-seasons, it is open at all train times, maintained by a caretaker. Passengers with layovers there often visit the non-profit Old Pass Gallery, located on the station grounds in the restored 1910 Railway Express Agency building. The station also includes a former freight depot.

Railroad service through the community of Otero, New Mexico Territory began on July 4, 1879, when service opened to Las Vegas on the Atchison, Topeka and Santa Fe Railroad. The railroad began construction of a new station in May 1903. Designed in a Mission Revival architectural style, the new depot opened on January 4, 1904.

== See also ==
- List of Amtrak stations

== Bibliography ==
- Federal Writers' Project (1940). New Mexico: A Guide to the Colorful State. Coronado Cuarto Centennial Commission. ISBN 9781623760304.
