= Dorsey Mansion =

Historic house in New Mexico, United States

- U.S. National Register of Historic Places
- NM State Register of Cultural Properties
- Location within New Mexico
- Nearest city: Abbott, New Mexico
- Coordinates: 36°29′12″N 104°11′28″W
- Area: 5 acres (2.0 ha)
- Built: 1883
- Architect: Stephen W. Dorsey
- Architectural style: Gothic
- NRHP reference No.: 70000399
- NMSRCP No.: 34

Significant dates
- Added to NRHP: September 4, 1970
- Designated NMSRCP: December 21, 1969

The Dorsey Mansion is a log and stone mansion built in 1878 by Stephen W. Dorsey, a controversial carpetbagging Republican who served as United States Senator from Arkansas during the Reconstruction from 1873 until 1879. The mansion is located 12 miles north of US Route 56, north-east of Springer, New Mexico.

While a senator, Dorsey purchased land near Chico Springs, New Mexico, and built a 36-room Gothic Victorian palace between 1878 and 1886. The architectural styles include log cabin (built between 1878 and 1880) as well as an Arthurian stone fortress in 1884. The dining room was the largest room in any home in the region, and it could seat 60 people. It had a marble fireplace imported from Italy. The art gallery had a cathedral ceiling, and exhibited paintings imported from overseas. There were nine bedrooms, and the first indoor toilet in the region. There was a swimming pool and fountain in the front yard facing a tower that was decorated with gargoyle representations of Dorsey, his wife, and brother. The swimming pool had three islands and a gazebo. There was a billiard room, and Dorsey held parties that were famous throughout the Southwest.

Dorsey acquired much of the money for the house through corrupt mail contracts, giving him the nickname of Star Route Stephen. In 1881, President Chester Arthur ordered the prosecution of Dorsey and eight accomplices. However, the trial in Washington, DC resulted in a hung jury. Dorsey ran his Mountain Spring cattle ranch, using his famous Triangle Dot brand, content to be on the ranch because "my cattle do not vote." In the late 1880s he established the nearby town of Clayton, New Mexico, which he named for his son Clayton. Dorsey attempted to become a leader of the Republican party in New Mexico, but his debts and lawsuits thwarted his ambitions.

By 1892, Dorsey and his wife were almost destitute. For a while, the Dorseys operated the Mansion as a tuberculosis sanatorium. They moved to Los Angeles, where Dorsey's wife Helen died in 1897, and Dorsey died in 1916, almost penniless. After Helen's death, the Mansion was badly encumbered by creditor's liens. In 1901, the Mansion was sold at auction to Solomon Floersheim, one of the creditors.

There were a series of owners during the first half of the 20th century. These included Dr. H. B. Masten (1902), William Van Bruggen (1907), Lewis Griggs (1912). The Post Office and Mercantile closed in the 1950s, and many of the outbuildings collapsed. K.E. Deaton bought the property and adjoining 40 acres (160,000 m^{2}) in 1966, and tried to renovate the Mansion. After Deaton's death, his heirs sold the property to the State of New Mexico in 1973.

The New Mexico State Museum concluded that the Mansion was too expensive to renovate properly. On December 4, 1987, the Dorsey Mansion State Monument was sold to Dr. Roger W. Akers and Sandra Henning. They are the current owners. At present, the Mansion is not open for tours.

== See also ==
- National Register of Historic Places listings in Colfax County, New Mexico
