= R.H. Cowan Livery Stable =

- Cowan, R. H., Livery Stable
- U.S. National Register of Historic Places
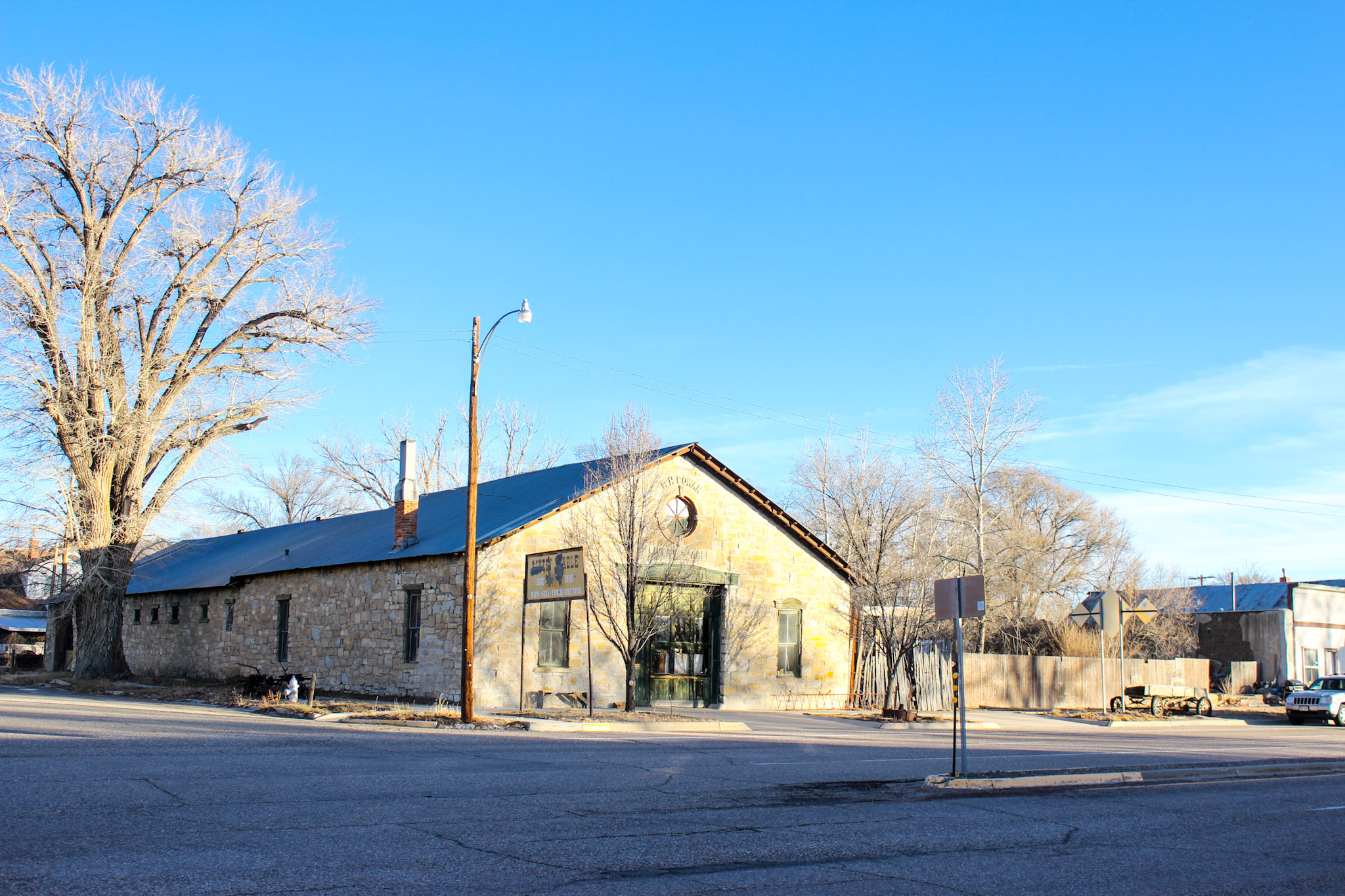
- Photo from 2017

- Location within New Mexico
- Location: 220 Maxwell Ave., Springer, New Mexico
- Coordinates: 36°21′34″N 104°35′41″W
- Area: 0.3 acres (0.12 ha)
- Built: 1883
- NRHP reference No.: 79001538
- Added to NRHP: August 3, 1979

The R.H. Cowan Livery Stable, at 220 Maxwell Ave. in Springer, New Mexico, was built in 1883. It was listed on the National Register of Historic Places in 1979.

It is a 50 by 140 feet (15 m × 43 m) building with 18 inches (0.46 m) thick walls made of sandstone rubble. In 1979 the building was "shaded on the north by an enormous cottonwood". On its gable front there is a round window with the words "R. H. Cowan Livery Stable" above, and, in 1979 it also showed "1883", although the date of construction was not fully readable. Historic photos show it fully.
