= El Raton Theater =

- U.S. National Register of Historic Places
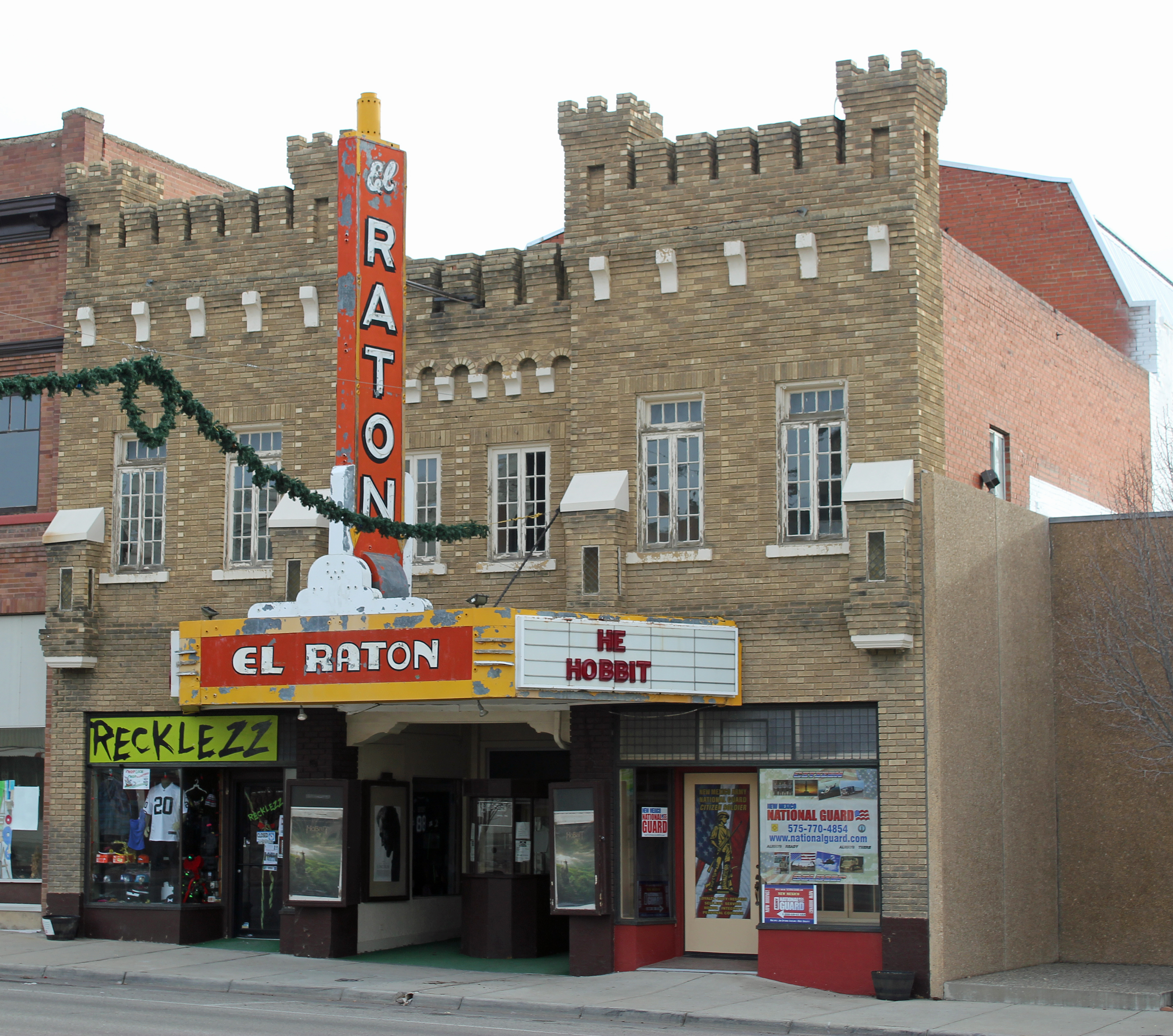

- Location within New Mexico
- Location: 115 N. Second St., Raton, New Mexico
- Coordinates: 36°54′15″N 104°26′21″W
- Area: less than one acre
- Architect: George H. Williamson
- Architectural style: Late Gothic Revival
- MPS: Movie Theaters in New Mexico MPS
- NRHP reference No.: 06001250
- Added to NRHP: January 17, 2007

The El Raton Theater, at 115 N. Second St. in Raton, New Mexico, is a theatre built in 1930. It was listed on the National Register of Historic Places in 2007.

It was designed by architect George H. Williamson with elements of Late Gothic Revival style that suggest a Late Gothic Revival-style castle. It is a two-story brick building with a crenellated parapet and small towers.
