= Kearny School =

- U.S. National Register of Historic Places
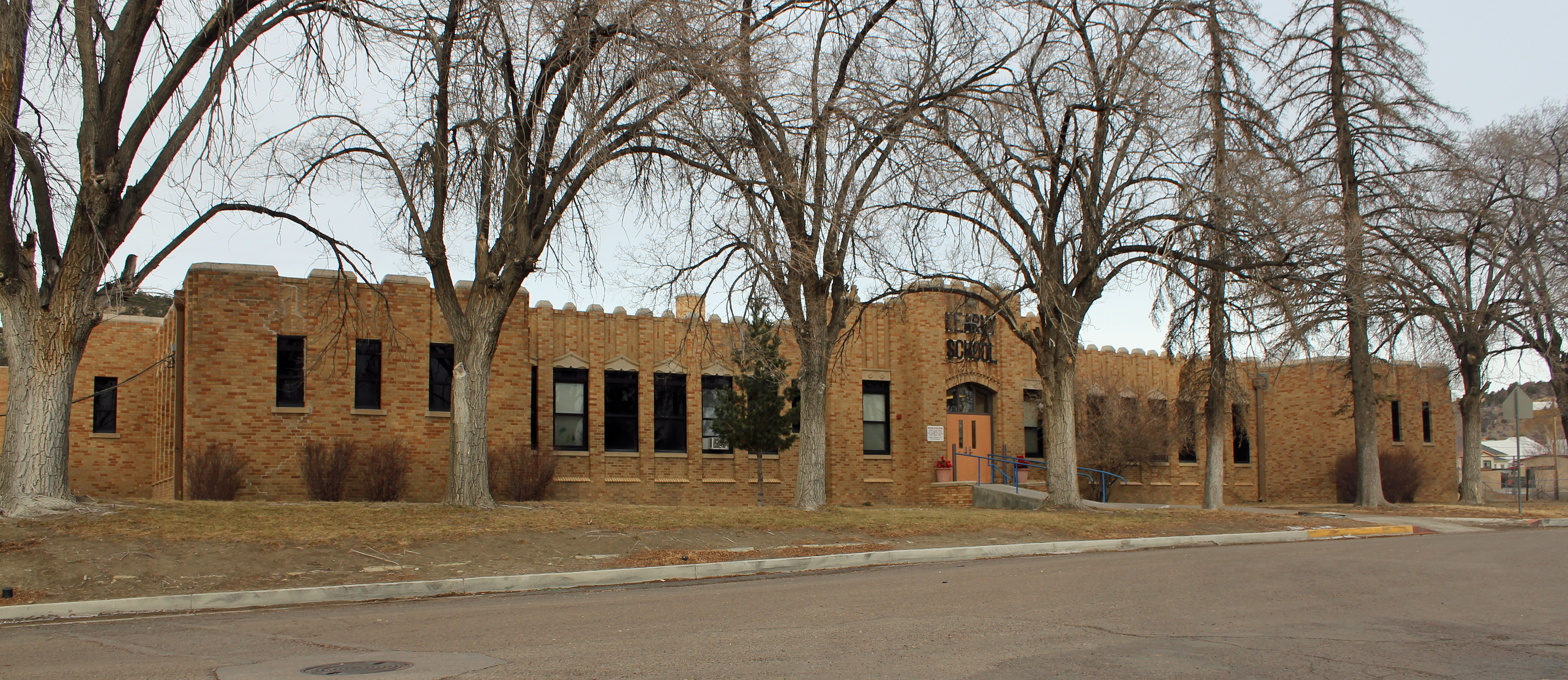

- Location within New Mexico
- Location: 800 S. 3rd St., Raton, New Mexico
- Coordinates: 36°53′42″N 104°26′32″W
- Area: 1 acre (0.40 ha)
- Built: 1936
- Built by: PWA
- Architectural style: Art Deco
- MPS: New Deal in New Mexico MPS
- NRHP reference No.: 96000259
- Added to NRHP: March 15, 1996

The Kearny School, at 800 S. 3rd St. in Raton, New Mexico, was built in 1936. It was listed on the National Register of Historic Places in 1996.

It was a Public Works Administration project.

Architecture: Art Deco Historic function: Education Historic subfunction: Library
