= NRA Whittington Center =

Shooting facility in the United States

Coordinates: 36°46′25″N 104°29′9″W

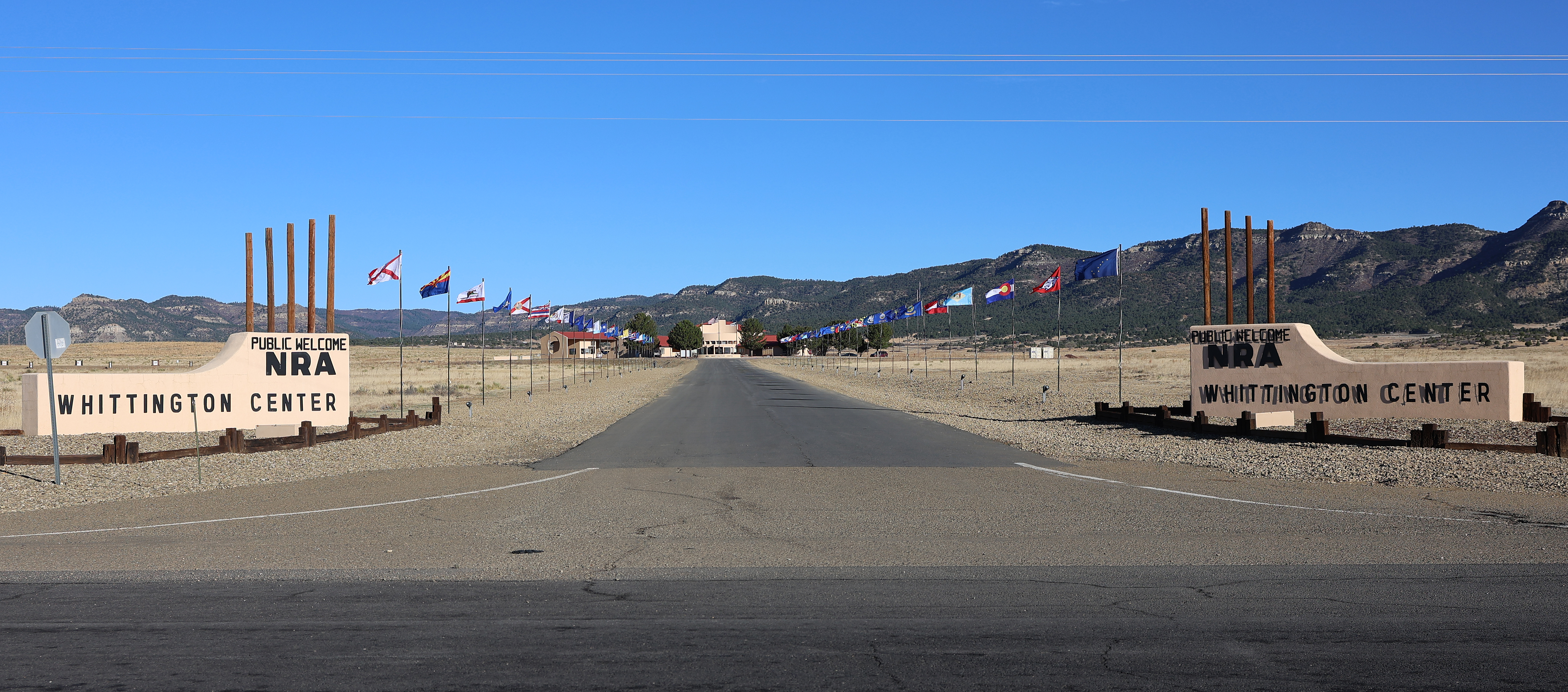
The center's entrance area (2026)

The NRA Whittington Center is one of the largest and most comprehensive shooting facilities in the United States. Owned and operated by the National Rifle Association of America (NRA), the centre is located in the Sangre de Cristo Mountains of Colfax County, New Mexico. Ten percent of the 33,300-acre (13,500 ha) site has been developed to include twenty-three shooting ranges, an administration building, a cafeteria, a museum, a library, classrooms, and full-service hookups for 175 recreational vehicles. The remainder of the site provides wildlife habitat at elevations above 6,300 feet (1,900 m) with primitive camp-grounds and remote back-country cabins for hunting, bird watching, wildlife viewing, photography, hiking, mountain biking, and horseback riding.

== History ==
Whittington Center includes a segment of the historic Santa Fe Trail near the trail landmark Red River Peak. Land including the ghost town of Van Houten, New Mexico, was owned by the National Rifle Association and named for former association president George R. Whittington. Development began in 1973 for competitive shooting events, firearms education, and outdoor recreation. Whittington Center operates as an independent nonprofit with a mission of education and outdoor recreation. NRA membership is not required to visit the center, and many visitors arrive from the nearby Philmont Scout Ranch. The nearby community of Raton, New Mexico estimates an annual revenue of seven million US dollars from Whittington Center visitors.

In 1992, the centre hosted the ICFRA World Long Range Championships (a.k.a. the "Palma Match"). In 2013, the centre hosted the F-Class World Championships.

== Range facilities ==
- archery
- benchrest shooting
- black powder
- high power rifle to 1,000 yards (910 m)
- high power rifle silhouette
- hunter pistol silhouette
- hunter sight-in
- long range pistol silhouette
- Precision pistol competition (PPC)
- practical pistol
- skeet shooting
- small-bore rifle
- smallbore rifle silhouette
- sporting clays
- trap shooting

== Other facilities ==
The Frank Brownell Museum of the Southwest located on the property includes a research library and a large firearms exhibit. Temporary living facilities on the property include lodges, cabins, tent sites, and recreational vehicle pads and hookups. Two consecutive two-week Adventure Camps are offered in June and July for boys and girls aged 13 to 17 to learn gun safety, shooting fundamentals, and marksmanship. Wildlife species utilizing the habitat include elk, pronghorn, mule deer, and turkey.
