= Original Townsite Historic District =

- U.S. National Register of Historic Places
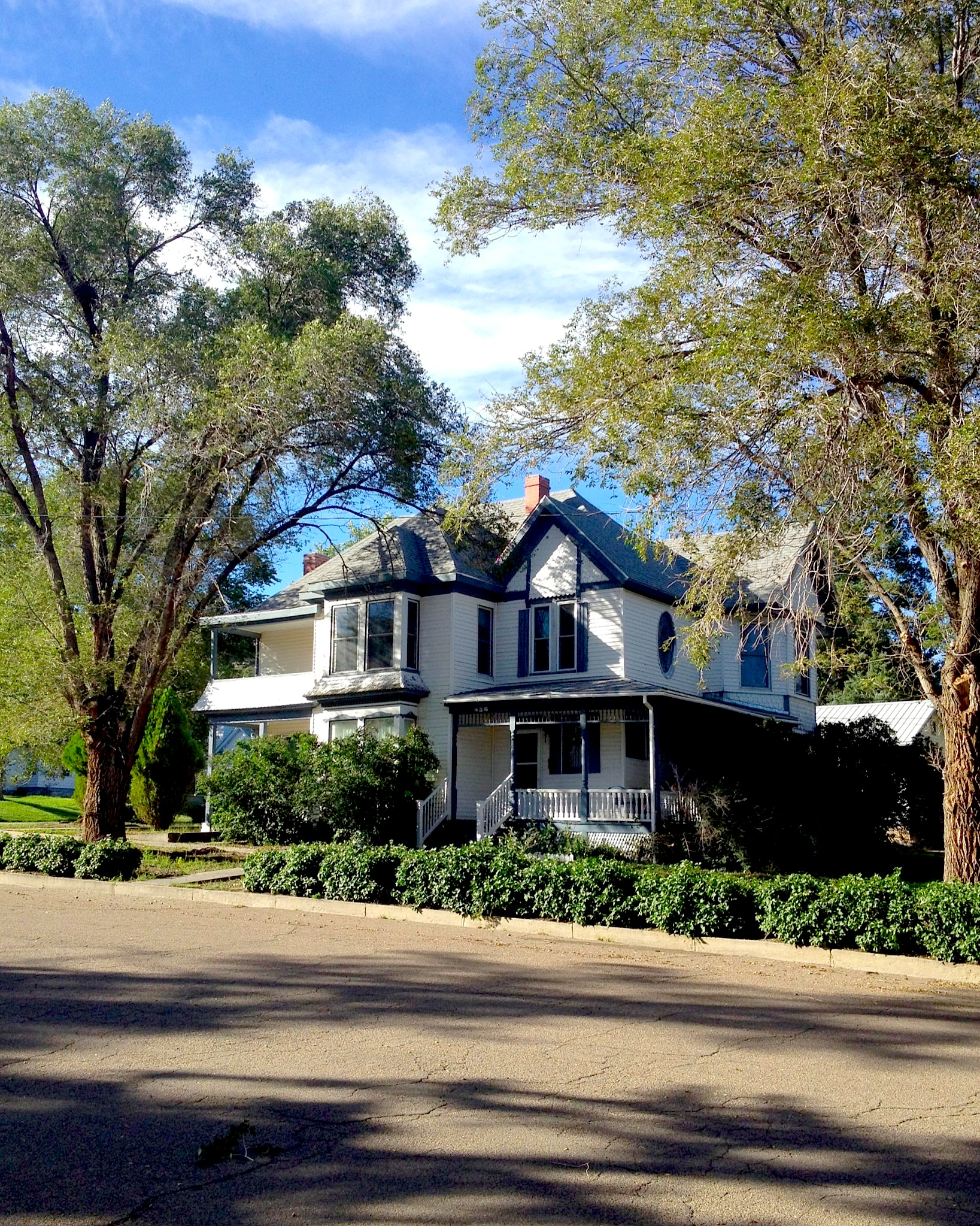

- Location within New Mexico Location within the United States
- Location: Roughly bounded by Clark & Cimmaron Aves., S. 2nd & S. 7th Sts., Raton, New Mexico
- Coordinates: 36°53′58″N 104°26′37″W
- Area: 120 acres (49 ha)
- Built: 1880
- Architect: William M. Rapp, Isaac H. Rapp, George C. Burnett
- Architectural style: Queen Anne, Late 19th and 20th Century Revivals
- NRHP reference No.: 08000230
- Added to NRHP: March 27, 2008

The Original Townsite Historic District in Raton, New Mexico is a historic district which was listed on the National Register of Historic Places in 2008.

The district is a 120 acres (49 ha) roughly bounded by Clark & Cimmaron Avenues, S. 2nd & S. 7th Streets within Raton, a town that was platted in 1880. The district included 360 contributing buildings, a contributing structure, and a contributing structure.

It includes works by architects William M. Rapp & Isaac H. Rapp.

It includes:

- the George Pace House (1907), South Fifth Street, designed by George C. Burnett
