= Brilliant, New Mexico =

Unincorporated community in New Mexico, US

Coordinates: 36°57′22″N 104°32′04″W

Brilliant is an unincorporated community in Colfax County, in the U.S. state of New Mexico.

An old variant name of Brilliant was Swastika. Swastika was renamed Brilliant after the swastika symbol was adopted by the Nazis. The Brilliant post office closed in 1954.
