= La Mesa Park =

Horse racing track in New Mexico

- Location: Raton, New Mexico
- Date opened: 1946
- Date closed: 1992
- Race type: Thoroughbred; Quarter Horse
- Course type: Dirt
- Notable races: Land of Enchantment Futurity
- Live racing handle: $11,967,687 (annual record 1977)
- Attendance: 4,892 (daily record 1965)

La Mesa Park was a horseracing track in Raton, New Mexico. The track hosted both Thoroughbred and Quarter Horse racing. When La Mesa opened in 1946, it was the first horseracing track in New Mexico. La Mesa Park closed in 1992.
