= Colfax County Courthouse (Springer, New Mexico) =

- Colfax County Courthouse in Springer
- U.S. National Register of Historic Places
- NM State Register of Cultural Properties
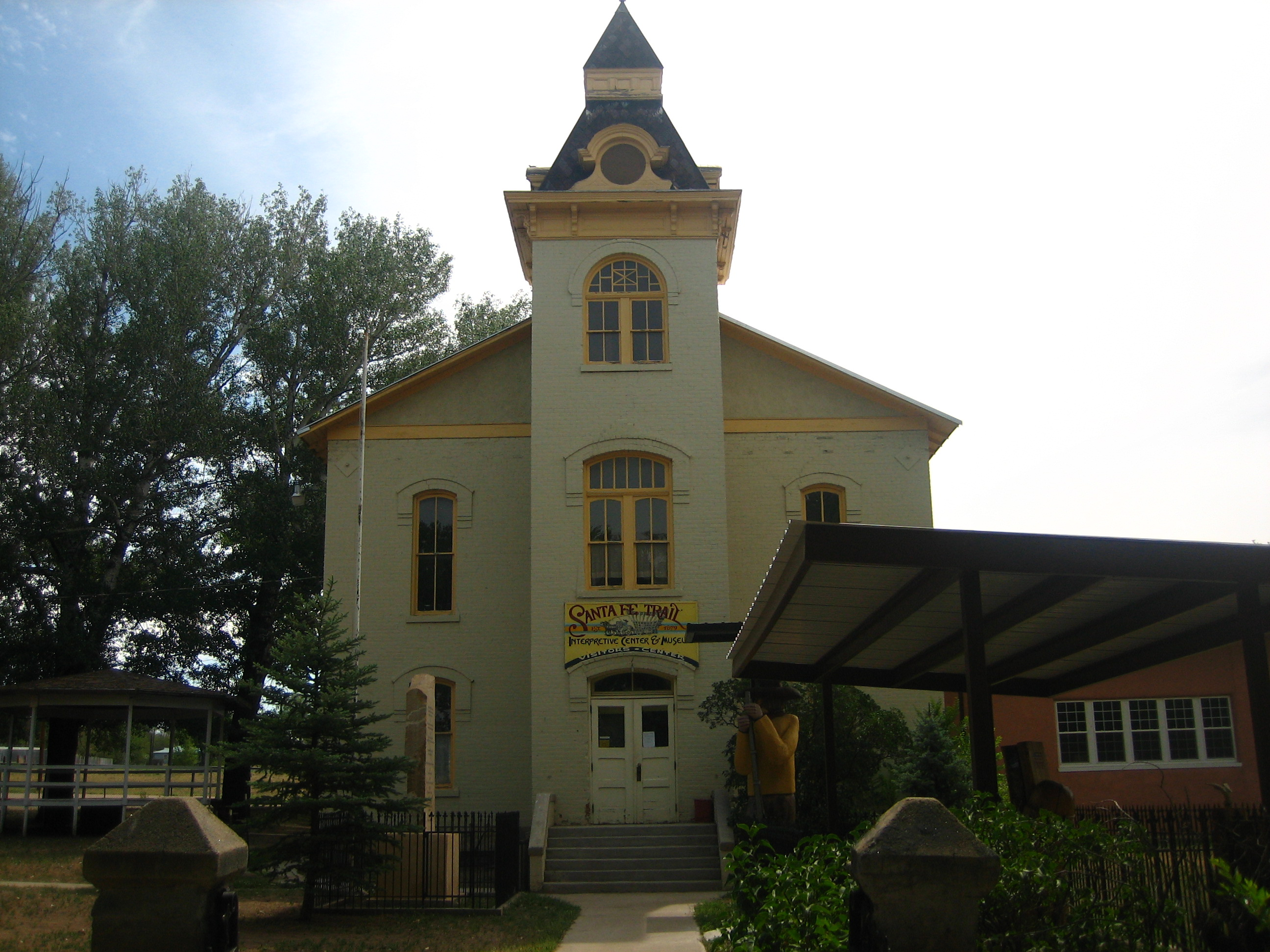
- Former courthouse in 2008

- Location within New Mexico
- Location: 614 Maxwell Ave., Springer, New Mexico
- Coordinates: 36°29′53″N 104°35′27″W
- Area: 2 acres (0.81 ha)
- Built: 1882
- Architectural style: Second Empire
- MPS: County Courthouses of New Mexico TR
- NRHP reference No.: 87000883
- NMSRCP No.: 509

Significant dates
- Added to NRHP: December 7, 1987
- Designated NMSRCP: June 3, 1977

The Colfax County Courthouse in Springer, New Mexico, is a building on the National Register of Historic Places that was used as a seat of county government for Colfax County, New Mexico from 1881 until 1897. The building is located at 614 Maxwell Avenue, Springer, NM 87747, and today it houses a museum devoted to the Santa Fe Trail. The building was placed on the National Register in 1987.

== Building ==
The arrival of the Atchison, Topeka, and Santa Fe Railroad caused the county seat of Colfax County to be moved from Cimarron to what would become Springer in 1881. The construction of a new courthouse began in 1879.

The building was constructed in Second Empire Style, and is a typical New Mexico Territorial courthouse. The symmetrical, two-story building has a pitched roof, arched windows, and projecting three-story tower. The courtroom was on the second floor, with the judge's chambers in the rear. A single brick jail cell was later added at the back of the building.

== History ==
In 1885, the courthouse lawn was the site of one of the last gun battles of the Colfax County War.

In 1897, as the result of a referendum and legislative action, the county seat was moved from Springer to Raton, forty miles to the north. The county clerk in Springer refused to release the county records until officials removed them by force.

From 1910 to 1917, the courthouse was the first home of the New Mexico Reform School, which was later renamed the New Mexico Industrial School for Boys. After that, the courthouse was the site of the municipal offices and the Springer Public Library.

In 1965, Springer residents voted to make the building into a museum devoted to the history of the Santa Fe Trail.

== See also ==
- National Register of Historic Places listings in Colfax County, New Mexico
