= New Mexico State Road 21 =

State highway in New Mexico, United States

State Road 21
- NM 21 highlighted in red

Route information
- Maintained by NMDOT
- Length: 34.447 mi (55.437 km)

Major junctions
- West end: US 64 in Cimarron
- East end: I-25 BL / US 56 / US 412 in Springer

Location
- Country: United States
- State: New Mexico
- Counties: Colfax

Highway system
- New Mexico State Highway System; Interstate; US; State; Scenic
← NM 20	→ NM 22

New Mexico State Road 21 (NM 21), is a 34.447-mile-long (55.437 km) state highway located entirely in Colfax County in the U.S. state of New Mexico. The road starts in the center of the town of Cimarron at U.S. Route 64 (US 64) and runs southward then east to an intersection with unsigned I-25 Business (I-25 Bus.) and the western termini of US 56 and US 412 in Springer.

== Route description ==
The road starts in the center of the town of Cimarron at the intersection of U.S. Route 64 (US 64) and Collision Avenue. It goes southward as South Collision Avenue. Leaving town limits it is called the Santa Fe Trail and passes by the well known Philmont Scout Ranch when it junctions with Cito Road and Conejo Road. On the road you can view the Tooth of Time and drive by the Villa Philmonte mansion and the Seton Memorial Library.

The road continues to drive along Philmont property until it reaches Rayado. In Rayado, the road turns south and continues past rustic ranches until it reaches a Y-intersection with the old NM 199 where NM 21 heads east towards the ranches at Miami. It then goes 1.5 miles (2.4 km) east, turns north for 1.7 miles (2.7 km) where it joins County Road 6 from Rayado. About 9 miles (14 km) eastward of that intersection it goes underneath Interstate 25 (I-25) near exits 412 and 414. The road goes immediately into the town of Springer, where it is called West 4th Street, which is where it reaches its end at unsigned I-25 Business (I-25 Bus.) and the western termini of US 56 and US 412.

== Major intersections ==
The entire route is in Colfax County.

Location	mi	km	Destinations	Notes
Cimarron	0.000	0.000	US 64 (Kit Carson Highway) – Taos, Raton	Western terminus
Springer	34.447	55.437	I-25 BL (Maxwell Avenue) – Raton, Las Vegas	Eastern terminus
Springer	34.447	55.437	US 56 east / US 412 east (4th Street) – Clayton	Continuation beyond I-25 Bus.; western termini of US 56 and US 412
1.000 mi = 1.609 km; 1.000 km = 0.621 mi
