= Catskill Charcoal Ovens =

- U.S. National Register of Historic Places
- Location within New Mexico
- Nearest city: Raton, New Mexico
- Coordinates: 36°56′07″N 104°46′36″W
- Area: 1 acre (0.40 ha)
- Built: 1892
- NRHP reference No.: 78001813
- Added to NRHP: January 30, 1978

The Catskill Charcoal Ovens, near Raton, New Mexico, date from 1892. They were listed on the National Register of Historic Places in 1978.

They are 25 large brick structures which look like beehives, in two groups: 14 about 2.5 miles (4.0 km) west of the Catskill townsite, and 11 about two miles east of the townsite.

Each is about 28 feet (8.5 m) tall, with two 6 feet (1.8 m) arched openings, and 15 inches (0.38 m) thick brick walls.

They are located about 20 miles (32 km) southwest of Trinidad, Colorado and 35 miles (56 km) west of Raton, New Mexico. The Sangre de Cristo Mountains are to their west.
