= Cimarron Historic District =

Historic district in New Mexico, United States

- Cimmaron Historic District
- U.S. National Register of Historic Places
- U.S. Historic district
- NM State Register of Cultural Properties
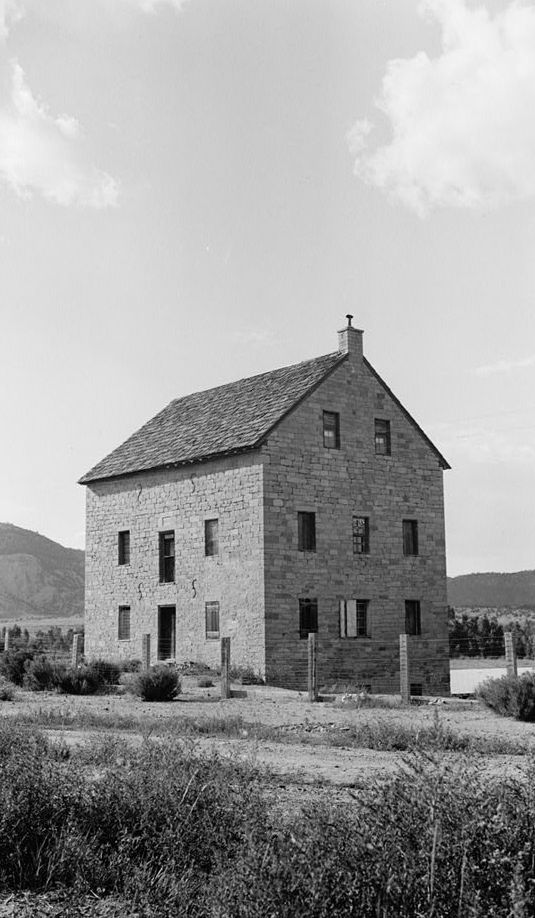
- Aztec Mill (Old Mill Museum), 1936

- Location within New Mexico
- Location: S edge of city along NM 21, Cimarron, New Mexico
- Coordinates: 36°30′16″N 104°55′17″W
- Area: 194 acres (79 ha)
- Built: 1850
- Architect: Henry Lambert
- NRHP reference No.: 73001140
- NMSRCP No.: 187

Significant dates
- Added to NRHP: April 3, 1973
- Designated NMSRCP: May 22, 1970

The Cimarron Historic District is a historic district on the south side of Cimarron, New Mexico, United States. The district is located south of US Route 64 on the east and west sides of New Mexico Highway 21. In 1973, the district was added to the U.S. National Register of Historic Places. According to the National Register, the district contains 1,940 acres (7.85 km^{2}; 3.03 sq mi) and contains 6 significant buildings.

There are fifteen buildings and historic sites shown on a 1986 map of the historic district

1. Early trading post. Location of Lucien Maxwell commissary.
2. Graves of mother-in-law and daughter of Lucien Maxwell.
3. Plaza well, dug about 1871.
4. Site of Lucien Maxwell home.
5. Former National Hotel.
6. Office of the Cimarron News built about 1872.
7. St. James Hotel. Listed on State Register (12/20/68)
8. The Adobe, built before 1892.
9. Second Colfax County Courthouse, 1870. Listed on State Register (5/19/86).
10. Aztec Grist Mill, built in 1864 for Lucien B. Maxwell. Now known as the Old Mill Museum. Listed on State Register (12/20/68).
11. Tom Boggs home, built about 1865.
12. Immaculate Conception Catholic Church, built 1881-1884?
13. Schwenk Hall.
14. Juan Charette's saloon.
15. Colfax County jail, 1872.

== See also ==
- National Register of Historic Places listings in Colfax County, New Mexico
