= Cimarron Mercantile =

- U.S. National Register of Historic Places
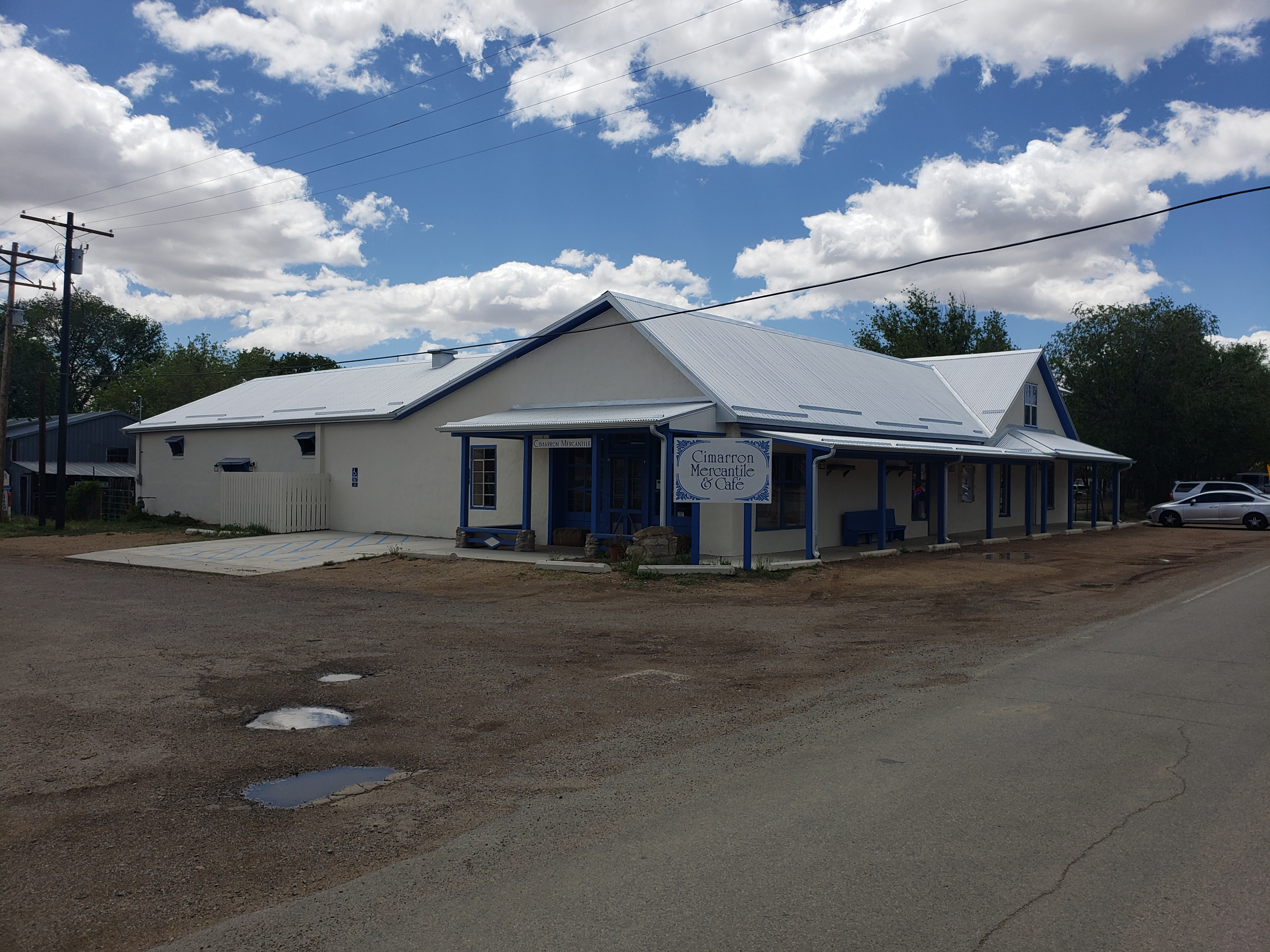

- Location within New Mexico
- Location: 709 S. Collison St., Cimarron, New Mexico
- Coordinates: 36°30′15″N 104°55′16″W
- NRHP reference No.: 100003458
- Added to NRHP: June 13, 2019

The Cimarron Mercantile, at 709 S. Collison St. in Cimarron, New Mexico, was listed on the National Register of Historic Places in 2019.

It is listed as a filming location by the New Mexico Film Office.
