= Colfax County, New Mexico =

County in New Mexico, United States

- County
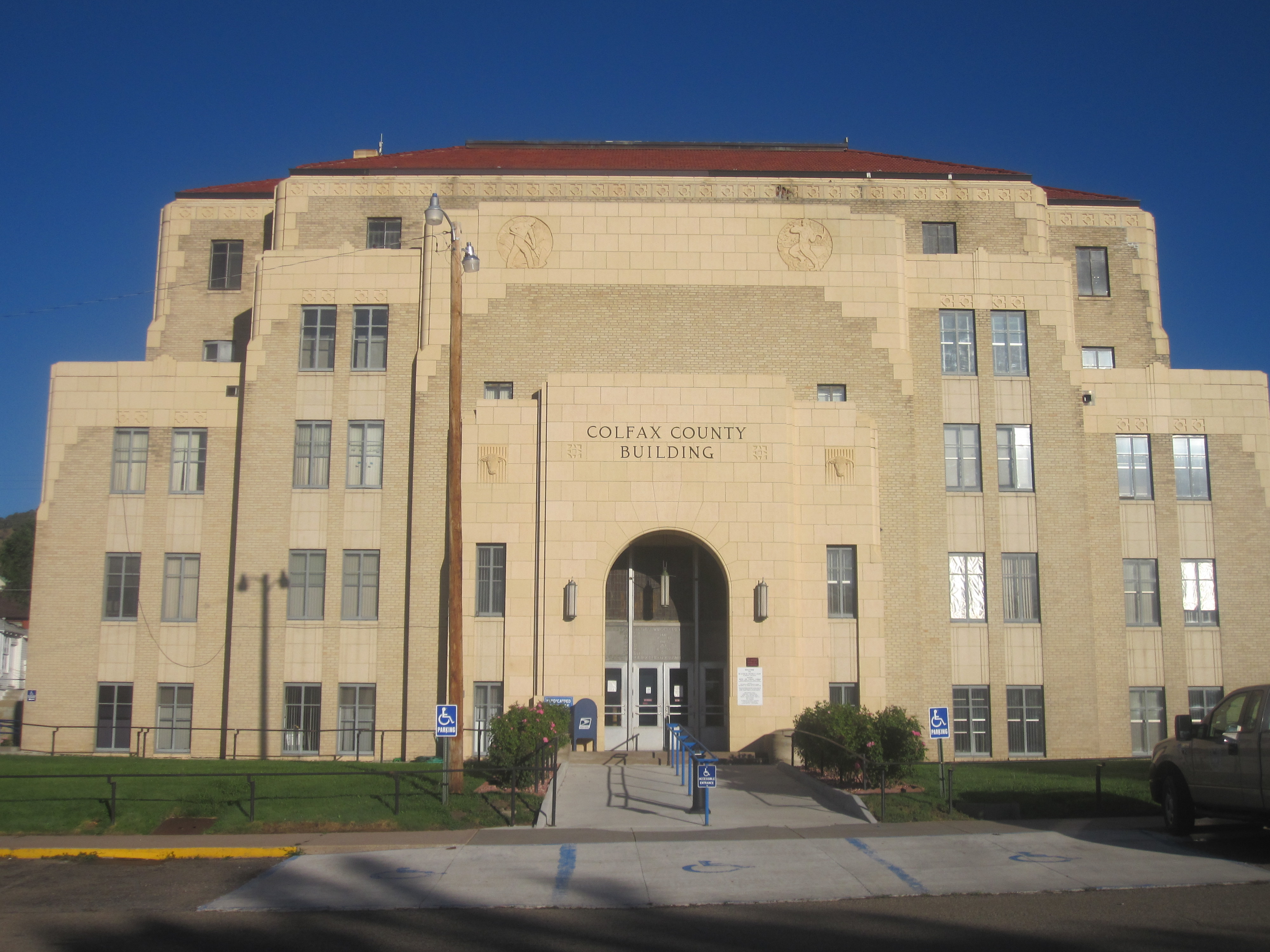
- Colfax County Courthouse in Raton

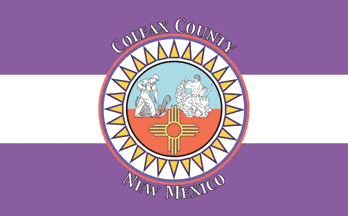
- Flag

- Location within the U.S. state of New Mexico
- Coordinates: 36°37′N 104°38′W
- Country: United States
- State: New Mexico
- Founded: January 25, 1869
- Named for: Schuyler Colfax
- Seat: Raton
- Largest city: Raton

Area
  - Total: 3,768 sq mi (9,760 km^{2})
  - Land: 3,758 sq mi (9,730 km^{2})
  - Water: 10 sq mi (26 km^{2}) 0.3%

Population (2020)
  - Total: 12,387
  - Estimate (2025): 12,184 ▼
  - Density: 3.3/sq mi (1.3/km^{2})
- Time zone: UTC−7 (Mountain)
  - Summer (DST): UTC−6 (MDT)
- Congressional district: 3rd
- Website: www.co.colfax.nm.us

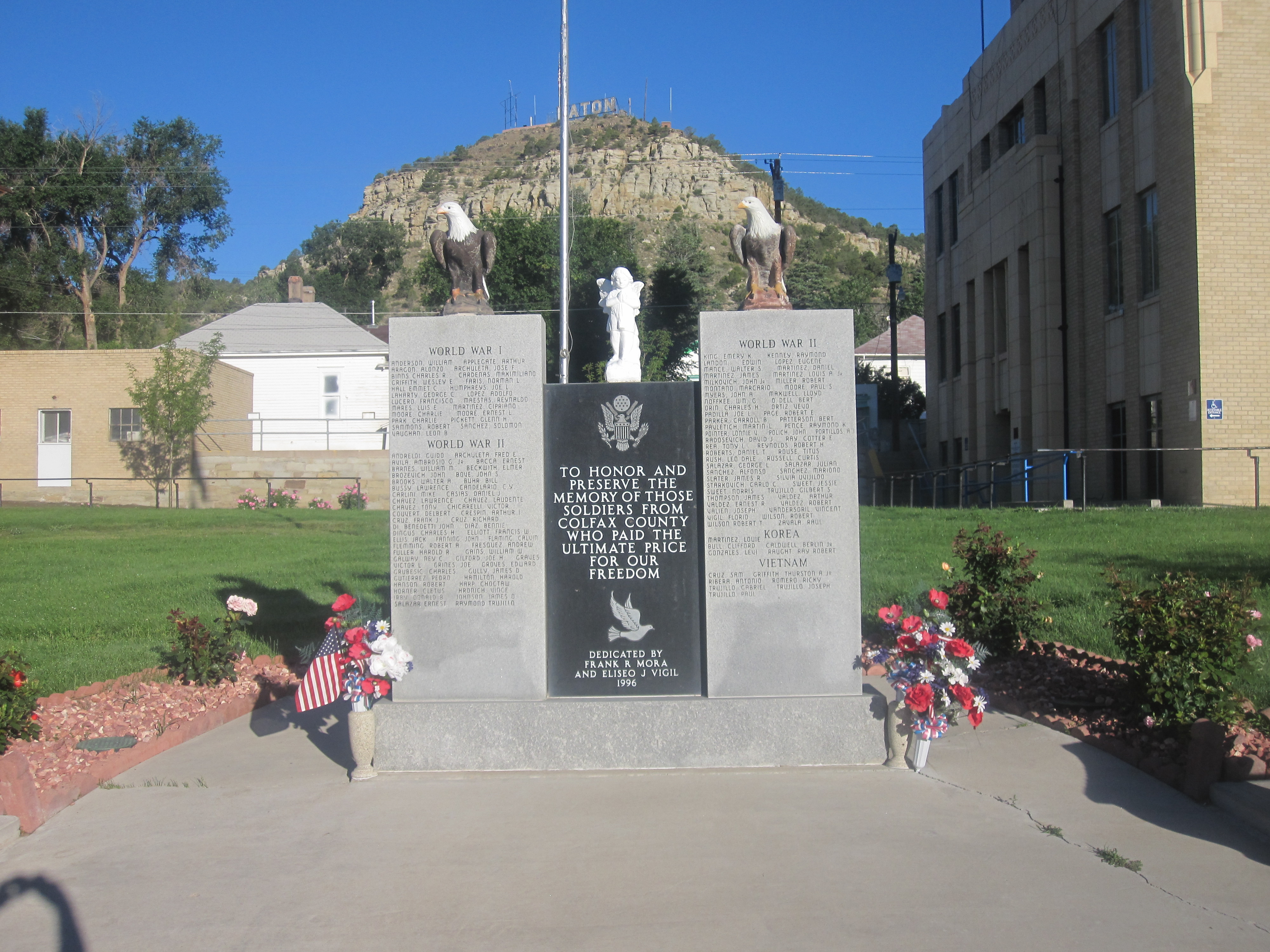
Veterans Monument at Colfax County Courthouse in Raton

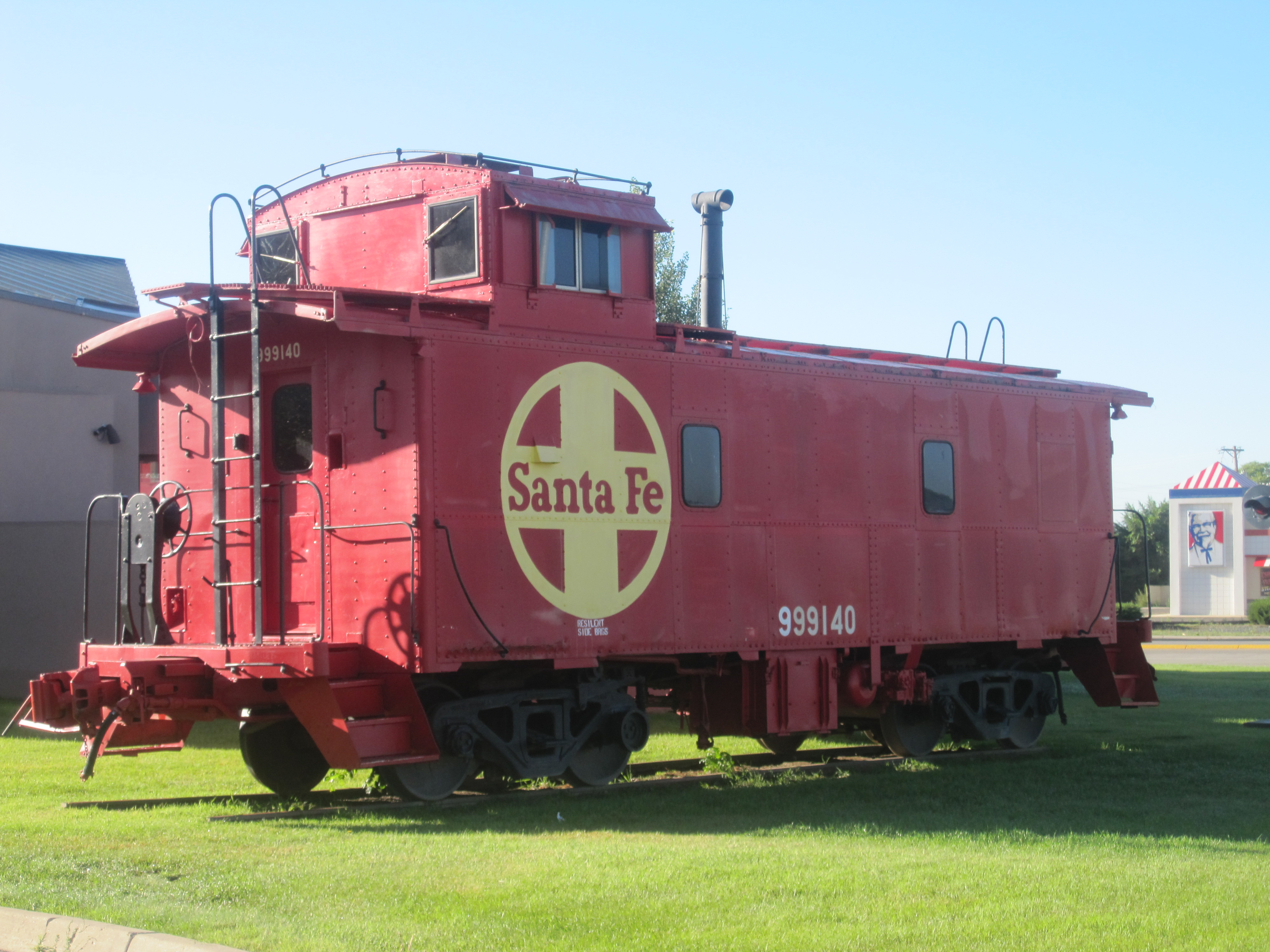
Former Atchison, Topeka, and Santa Fe Railroad car displayed at Raton

Colfax County is a county in the U.S. state of New Mexico. As of the 2020 census, the population was 12,387. Its county seat is Raton. It is south from the Colorado state line. This county was named for Schuyler Colfax (1823–1885), seventeenth Vice President of the United States under U.S. President Ulysses S. Grant.

Colfax County is the home of Philmont Scout Ranch and the NRA Whittington Center.

== History ==
Colfax County was originally part of Taos County, one of the original nine counties created by the New Mexico Territory in 1852. In 1859, the eastern part of Taos County, including all of the territory of Colfax County, was split off to form Mora County. Colfax County was established on January 25, 1869, from the northern part of Mora County. The original county seat was the gold mining town of Elizabethtown.

By 1872, when the gold rush in Elizabethtown had died down, the county seat was moved to Cimarron. Cimarron was on the stage coach route along the Mountain Branch of the Santa Fe Trail, and was the headquarters of the Maxwell Land Grant. The Colfax County Courthouse in Cimarron is a contributing structure in the Cimarron Historic District, and is still in use as a Masonic lodge.

In 1881, the county seat moved from Cimarron to Springer, on the former Atchison, Topeka, and Santa Fe Railroad, since 1996 part of the BNSF Railway. The Colfax County Courthouse in Springer was the site of one of the last important shoot-outs in the Colfax County War. This former courthouse, which is on the National Register of Historic Places is now a museum devoted to the Santa Fe Trail.

The eastern portions of Colfax, Mora, and San Miguel counties were severed to form Union County in 1893.

After a referendum and a bitter legislative fight, the county seat moved from Springer to Raton in 1897. Raton was an important coal-mining town, and was also a railroad center. The citizens of Raton raised $8000 to pay one third of the costs of a new courthouse. That courthouse was replaced in 1932 by the current Colfax County Courthouse (Raton, New Mexico), an art-deco WPA structure that also is on the National Register of Historic Places.

== Geography ==
According to the U.S. Census Bureau, the county has a total area of 3,768 square miles (9,759 km^{2}), of which 3,758 square miles (9,733 km^{2}) is land and 10 square miles (26 km^{2}) (0.3%) is water.

A large portion of the County lies in the Sangre de Cristo Mountains. Geography ranges from prairies, to pinon forests, to alpine meadows.

The County contains numerous state parks, ski resorts, national forests, scenic vistas, and outdoor recreational activities.

=== Adjacent counties ===
- Taos County - west
- Mora County - south
- Harding County - south
- Union County - east
- Las Animas County, Colorado - north
- Costilla County, Colorado - northwest

=== National protected areas ===
- Carson National Forest (part)
- Kiowa National Grassland (part)
- Maxwell National Wildlife Refuge

== Demographics ==
Historical population
Census	Pop.	Note	%±
1870	1,992		—
1880	3,398		70.6%
1890	7,974		134.7%
1900	10,150		27.3%
1910	16,460		62.2%
1920	21,550		30.9%
1930	19,157		−11.1%
1940	18,718		−2.3%
1950	16,761		−10.5%
1960	13,806		−17.6%
1970	12,170		−11.8%
1980	13,667		12.3%
1990	12,925		−5.4%
2000	14,189		9.8%
2010	13,750		−3.1%
2020	12,387		−9.9%
2025 (est.)	12,184	▼	−1.6%
U.S. Decennial Census; 1790-1960 1900-1990; 1990-2000 2010

=== 2020 census ===
As of the 2020 census, the county had a population of 12,387. The median age was 50.0 years. 18.4% of residents were under the age of 18 and 26.7% of residents were 65 years of age or older. For every 100 females there were 96.2 males, and for every 100 females age 18 and over there were 94.4 males age 18 and over.

Colfax County, New Mexico – Racial and ethnic composition Note: the US Census treats Hispanic/Latino as an ethnic category. This table excludes Latinos from the racial categories and assigns them to a separate category. Hispanics/Latinos may be of any race.
Race / Ethnicity (NH = Non-Hispanic)	Pop 2000	Pop 2010	Pop 2020	% 2000	% 2010	% 2020
White alone (NH)	7,081	6,863	5,954	49.90%	49.91%	48.07%
Black or African American alone (NH)	41	39	25	0.29%	0.28%	0.20%
Native American or Alaska Native alone (NH)	109	130	108	0.77%	0.95%	0.87%
Asian alone (NH)	45	48	60	0.32%	0.35%	0.48%
Pacific Islander alone (NH)	1	6	11	0.01%	0.04%	0.09%
Other race alone (NH)	27	20	39	0.19%	0.15%	0.31%
Mixed race or Multiracial (NH)	146	156	312	1.03%	1.13%	2.52%
Hispanic or Latino (any race)	6,739	6,488	5,878	47.49%	47.19%	47.45%
Total	14,189	13,750	12,387	100.00%	100.00%	100.00%

The racial makeup of the county was 65.7% White, 0.3% Black or African American, 1.7% American Indian and Alaska Native, 0.5% Asian, 0.1% Native Hawaiian and Pacific Islander, 10.6% from some other race, and 21.1% from two or more races. Hispanic or Latino residents of any race comprised 47.5% of the population.

45.4% of residents lived in urban areas, while 54.6% lived in rural areas.

There were 5,519 households in the county, of which 22.4% had children under the age of 18 living with them and 28.2% had a female householder with no spouse or partner present. About 36.3% of all households were made up of individuals and 17.3% had someone living alone who was 65 years of age or older.

There were 9,503 housing units, of which 41.9% were vacant. Among occupied housing units, 70.4% were owner-occupied and 29.6% were renter-occupied. The homeowner vacancy rate was 4.3% and the rental vacancy rate was 10.3%.

=== 2010 census ===
As of the 2010 census, there were 13,750 people, 6,011 households, and 3,749 families living in the county. The population density was 3.7 inhabitants per square mile (1.4 inhabitants/km^{2}). There were 10,023 housing units at an average density of 2.7 units per square mile (1.0 units/km^{2}). The racial makeup of the county was 83.8% white, 1.5% American Indian, 0.5% black or African American, 0.4% Asian, 0.1% Pacific islander, 10.3% from other races, and 3.6% from two or more races. Those of Hispanic or Latino origin made up 47.2% of the population. In terms of ancestry, 14.1% were German, 9.7% were Irish, 9.3% were English, 6.1% were Italian, and 3.7% were American.

Of the 6,011 households, 25.8% had children under the age of 18 living with them, 45.9% were married couples living together, 10.9% had a female householder with no husband present, 37.6% were non-families, and 32.9% of all households were made up of individuals. The average household size was 2.22 and the average family size was 2.78. The median age was 46.7 years.

The median income for a household in the county was $39,216 and the median income for a family was $48,450. Males had a median income of $35,849 versus $23,977 for females. The per capita income for the county was $21,047. About 11.8% of families and 17.2% of the population were below the poverty line, including 23.8% of those under age 18 and 16.4% of those age 65 or over.

=== 2000 census ===
As of the 2000 census, there were 14,189 people, 5,821 households, and 3,975 families living in the county. The population density was 4 people per square mile (1.5 people/km^{2}). There were 8,959 housing units at an average density of 2 units per square mile (0.77/km^{2}). The racial makeup of the county was 81.50% White, 0.32% Black or African American, 1.47% Native American, 0.32% Asian, 0.01% Pacific Islander, 12.80% from other races, and 3.59% from two or more races. 47.49% of the population were Hispanic or Latino of any race.

There were 5,821 households, out of which 30.30% had children under the age of 18 living with them, 52.80% were married couples living together, 10.30% had a female householder with no husband present, and 31.70% were non-families. 27.70% of all households were made up of individuals, and 11.90% had someone living alone who was 65 years of age or older. The average household size was 2.37 and the average family size was 2.86.

In the county, the population was spread out, with 25.10% under the age of 18, 6.90% from 18 to 24, 24.50% from 25 to 44, 26.50% from 45 to 64, and 16.90% who were 65 years of age or older. The median age was 41 years. For every 100 females there were 102.70 males. For every 100 females age 18 and over, there were 98.30 males.

The median income for a household in the county was $30,744, and the median income for a family was $36,827. Males had a median income of $26,736 versus $19,644 for females. The per capita income for the county was $16,418. About 12.00% of families and 14.80% of the population were below the poverty line, including 21.20% of those under age 18 and 9.00% of those age 65 or over.

== Communities ==
=== City ===
- Raton (county seat)

=== Town ===
- Springer

=== Villages ===
- Angel Fire
- Cimarron
- Eagle Nest
- Maxwell

=== Census-designated place ===
- Ute Park

=== Unincorporated communities ===
- Black Lake
- Brilliant
- Carisbrook
- Colmor
- Dawson
- Dillon
- Elizabethtown
- Farley
- Miami
- Philmont Scout Ranch
- Rayado
- Sunny Side
- Sweetwater
- Van Houten
- Baldy Town

=== Former community ===
- Abbott

== Politics ==
Colfax County is a bellwether county in presidential elections; since 1912, the county has voted for the winner of the presidential election in most elections, with the only exceptions being in 1968, 1988, 2000 and 2020, when the county voted for Hubert Humphrey, Michael Dukakis, Al Gore and Donald Trump, respectively.

United States presidential election results for Colfax County, New Mexico
Year	Republican		Democratic		Third party(ies)	
Year	No.	%	No.	%	No.	%
1912	1,036	36.24%	1,182	41.34%	641	22.42%
1916	1,835	47.29%	2,006	51.70%	39	1.01%
1920	3,351	54.87%	2,709	44.36%	47	0.77%
1924	3,512	48.06%	3,067	41.97%	728	9.96%
1928	3,904	56.29%	3,022	43.57%	10	0.14%
1932	3,214	42.59%	4,282	56.74%	51	0.68%
1936	2,745	36.84%	4,661	62.56%	45	0.60%
1940	3,452	44.89%	4,234	55.06%	4	0.05%
1944	2,661	46.81%	3,017	53.07%	7	0.12%
1948	2,575	39.74%	3,871	59.74%	34	0.52%
1952	3,397	51.58%	3,184	48.34%	5	0.08%
1956	2,959	54.71%	2,450	45.29%	0	0.00%
1960	2,316	41.90%	3,187	57.65%	25	0.45%
1964	1,636	32.53%	3,367	66.95%	26	0.52%
1968	2,212	44.39%	2,477	49.71%	294	5.90%
1972	2,663	57.88%	1,855	40.32%	83	1.80%
1976	2,259	45.13%	2,718	54.29%	29	0.58%
1980	2,537	49.88%	2,266	44.55%	283	5.56%
1984	2,994	54.59%	2,435	44.39%	56	1.02%
1988	2,256	44.37%	2,785	54.77%	44	0.87%
1992	1,730	33.09%	2,607	49.87%	891	17.04%
1996	1,975	38.23%	2,659	51.47%	532	10.30%
2000	2,600	47.61%	2,653	48.58%	208	3.81%
2004	3,082	51.64%	2,824	47.32%	62	1.04%
2008	2,805	43.94%	3,490	54.67%	89	1.39%
2012	2,699	46.83%	2,828	49.06%	237	4.11%
2016	2,585	48.48%	2,129	39.93%	618	11.59%
2020	3,271	54.37%	2,611	43.40%	134	2.23%
2024	3,252	55.94%	2,436	41.91%	125	2.15%

== Education ==
School districts include:

- Cimarron Public Schools
- Des Moines Municipal Schools
- Maxwell Municipal Schools
- Raton Public Schools
- Springer Municipal Schools

== Transportation ==
=== Major highways ===
- I-25 / US 85 (unsigned)
  - I-25 BL (Springer)
  - I-25 BL (Raton)
- US 56 / US 412
- US 64
- US 87
- NM 21
- NM 38
- NM 39
- NM 72
- NM 120
- NM 127
- NM 193
- NM 204
- NM 445
- NM 505
- NM 526
- NM 555
- NM 569

== See also ==
- National Register of Historic Places listings in Colfax County, New Mexico
- Vermejo Reserve – Guest ranch in New Mexico, United States
