= Springer, New Mexico =

- Town
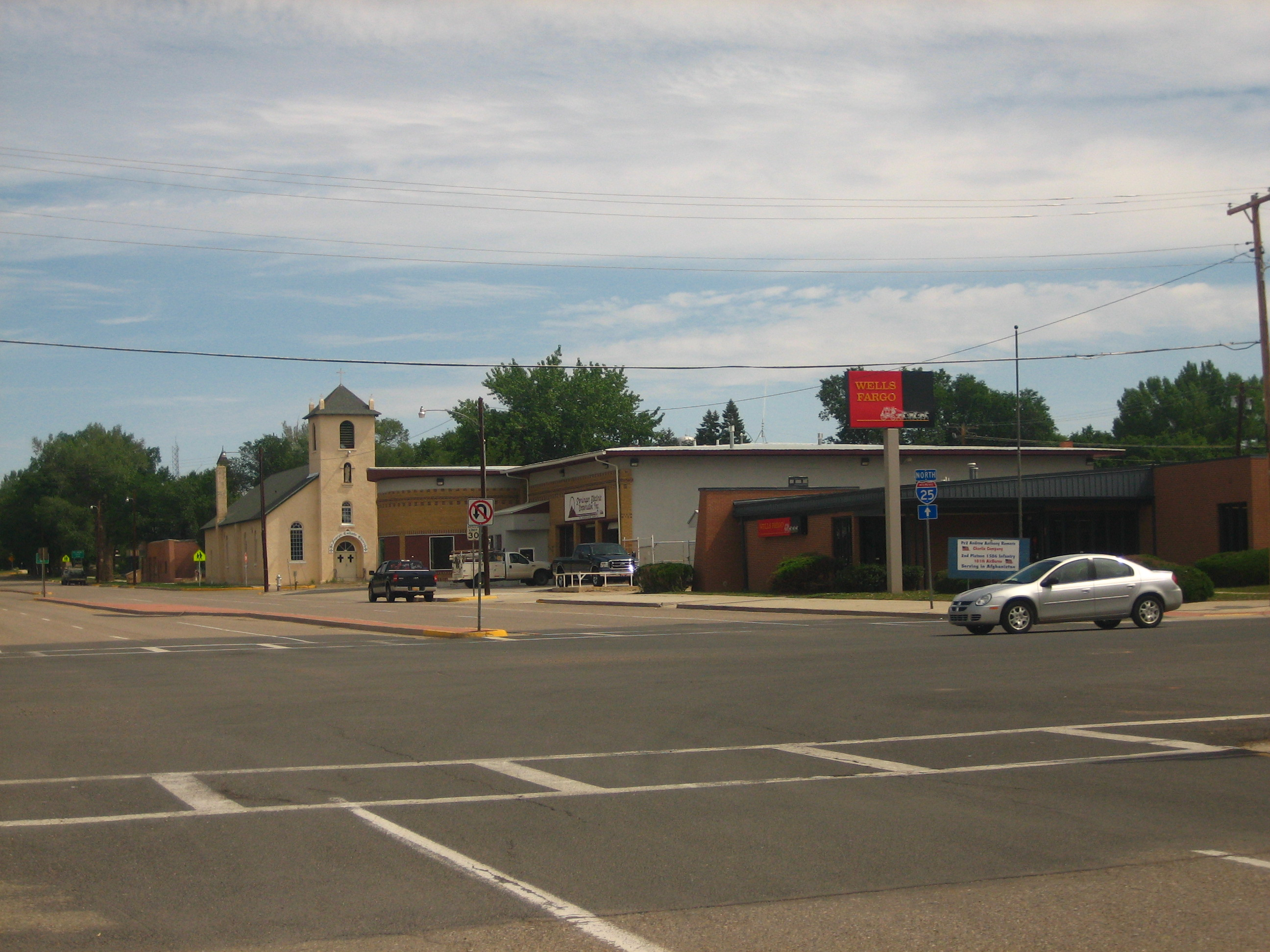
- Downtown Springer (2008)

- Location within Colfax County and New Mexico

- Location in the United States
- Coordinates: 36°22′43″N 104°36′23″W
- Country: United States
- State: New Mexico
- County: Colfax

Area
  - Total: 2.25 sq mi (5.84 km^{2})
  - Land: 2.20 sq mi (5.71 km^{2})
  - Water: 0.050 sq mi (0.13 km^{2})
- Elevation: 5,784 ft (1,763 m)

Population (2020)
  - Total: 931
  - Density: 422.4/sq mi (163.09/km^{2})
- Time zone: UTC-07:00 (MST)
  - Summer (DST): UTC-06:00 (MDT)
- ZIP codes: 87729, 87747
- Area code: 575
- FIPS code: 35-74800
- GNIS feature ID: 2413321

Springer is a town in Colfax County, New Mexico, United States. As of the 2020 census, Springer had a population of 931.

== History ==
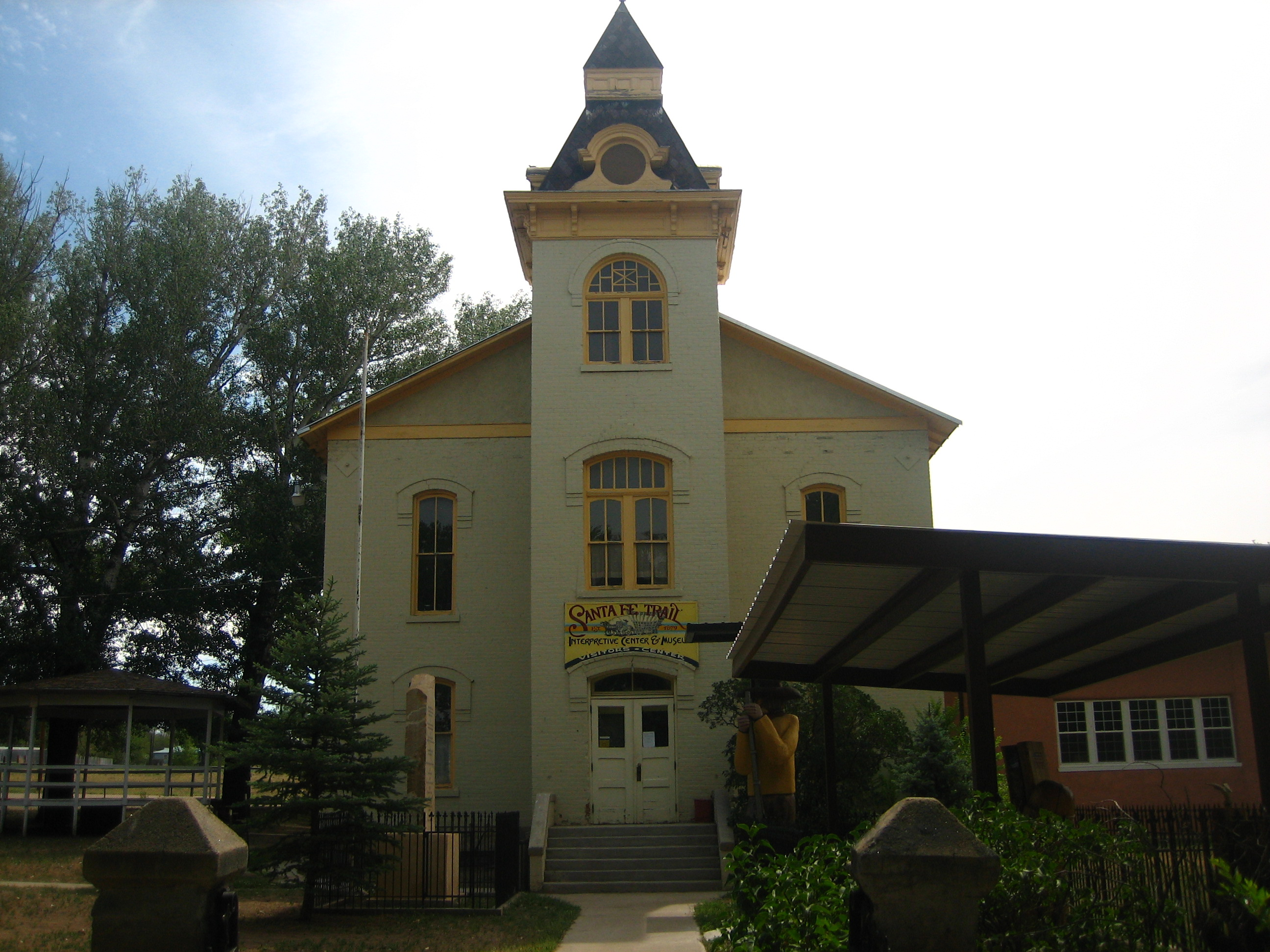
Former Colfax County Courthouse is now a historical museum

In 1877, William T Thornton, representing the Maxwell Land Grant and Railway Company commissioned Melvin Whitson Mills to "sell, locate, survey, map and plat, and lay out town site, no exceeding three hundred and twenty acres". Judge Mills selected a location along the Cimarron called Las Garzas and laid out the townsite and graded the streets. The Maxwell Land Grand and Railway Company conveyed the deed to Mills on March 31, 1880. The deed bequeathed the town Maxwell, but by 1883 according to the deed for the Mills Mansion, it was named Springer after two brothers: Charles Springer, a rancher near Cimarron and brother Frank, a lawyer and official of the Maxwell Land Grant Company.

The town was the county seat of Colfax County from 1882—1897 and keeps the former Courthouse as a museum. The location was chosen due to anticipation of the Atchison, Topeka and Santa Fe Railway coming and as it was halfway between the Mountain Branch and Cimarron Cutoff of the Santa Fe Trail.

The Springer Correctional Center, operated by the New Mexico Corrections Department, is located 2 miles (3 km) northwest of Springer. The correctional center is one of New Mexico's oldest detention facilities, having begun operation in 1909 as the New Mexico Boys' School.

== Geography ==
Springer is located in southern Colfax County in the valley of the Cimarron River, 6 miles (10 km) west of where that river flows into the Canadian River.

Interstate 25 passes along the west side of the town, with access from exits 412 and 414. I-25 leads north 40 miles (64 km) to Raton, the county seat, and southwest 68 miles (109 km) to Las Vegas. The western terminus of U.S. Routes 56 and 412 is in the center of Springer. The two routes together lead 82 miles (132 km) east to Clayton.

According to the United States Census Bureau, Springer has a total area of 1.5 square miles (3.8 km^{2}), all land.

== Demographics ==
Historical population
Census	Pop.	Note	%±
1910	550		—
1920	915		66.4%
1930	957		4.6%
1940	1,314		37.3%
1950	1,558		18.6%
1960	1,564		0.4%
1970	1,574		0.6%
1980	1,657		5.3%
1990	1,262		−23.8%
2000	1,285		1.8%
2010	1,047		−18.5%
2020	931		−11.1%
U.S. Decennial Census

As of the census of 2000, there were 1,285 people, 520 households, and 372 families residing in the town. The population density was 876.6 inhabitants per square mile (338.5/km^{2}). There were 605 housing units at an average density of 412.7 per square mile (159.3/km^{2}). The racial makeup of the town was 79.46% White, 1.09% Native American, 14.94% from other races, and 4.51% from two or more races. Hispanic or Latino of any race were 69.96% of the population.

There were 520 households, out of which 33.1% had children under the age of 18 living with them, 51.2% were married couples living together, 14.2% had a female householder with no husband present, and 28.3% were non-families. 26.5% of all households were made up of individuals, and 13.3% had someone living alone who was 65 years of age or older. The average household size was 2.41 and the average family size was 2.86.

In the town, the population was spread out, with 25.9% under the age of 18, 5.2% from 18 to 24, 25.1% from 25 to 44, 22.3% from 45 to 64, and 21.5% who were 65 years of age or older. The median age was 40 years. For every 100 females, there were 98.0 males. For every 100 females age 18 and over, there were 92.7 males.

The median income for a household in the town was $27,850, and the median income for a family was $34,563. Males had a median income of $24,479 versus $19,000 for females. The per capita income for the town was $14,606. About 14.9% of families and 16.6% of the population were below the poverty line, including 28.0% of those under age 18 and 8.9% of those age 65 or over.

== Notable people ==
- Fred Graham - athlete and actor
- Antonio M. Fernandez - member of the U.S. House of Representatives, 1943–56
- Ernest Medina - former infantry captain in the United States Army accused of ordering the My Lai massacre
- Antoun Saadeh - Lebanese politician and founder of the Syrian Social Nationalist Party
