= Raton, New Mexico =

- City
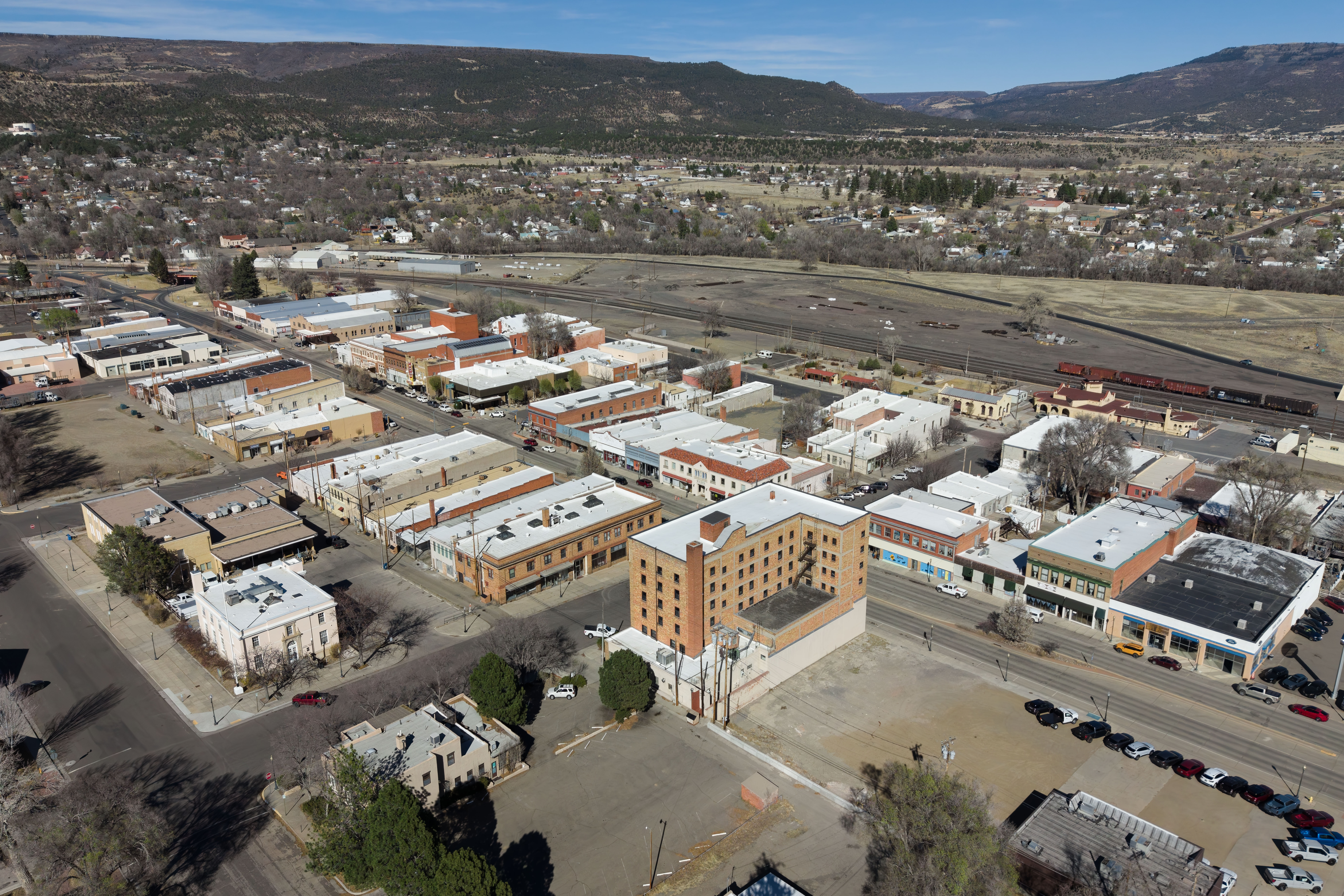
- Downtown Raton

- Location within Colfax County and New Mexico

- Location in the United States
- Coordinates: 36°52′25″N 104°26′24″W
- Country: United States
- State: New Mexico
- County: Colfax

Area
  - Total: 7.96 sq mi (20.62 km^{2})
  - Land: 7.96 sq mi (20.62 km^{2})
  - Water: 0 sq mi (0.00 km^{2})
- Elevation: 6,559 ft (1,999 m)

Population (2020)
  - Total: 6,041
  - Density: 760/sq mi (293/km^{2})
- Time zone: UTC-07:00 (MST)
  - Summer (DST): UTC-06:00 (MDT)
- ZIP code: 87740
- Area code: 575
- FIPS code: 35-62060
- GNIS feature ID: 2411522
- Website: ratonnm.gov

Raton (/rəˈtoʊn/ rə-TONE) is a city in and the county seat of Colfax County in northeastern New Mexico, United States. The city is located just south of Raton Pass. The city is also located about 6.5 miles (10.5 km) south of the New Mexico–Colorado border and 85 miles (137 km) west of Oklahoma. At the 2020 census, its population was 6,041.

== History ==
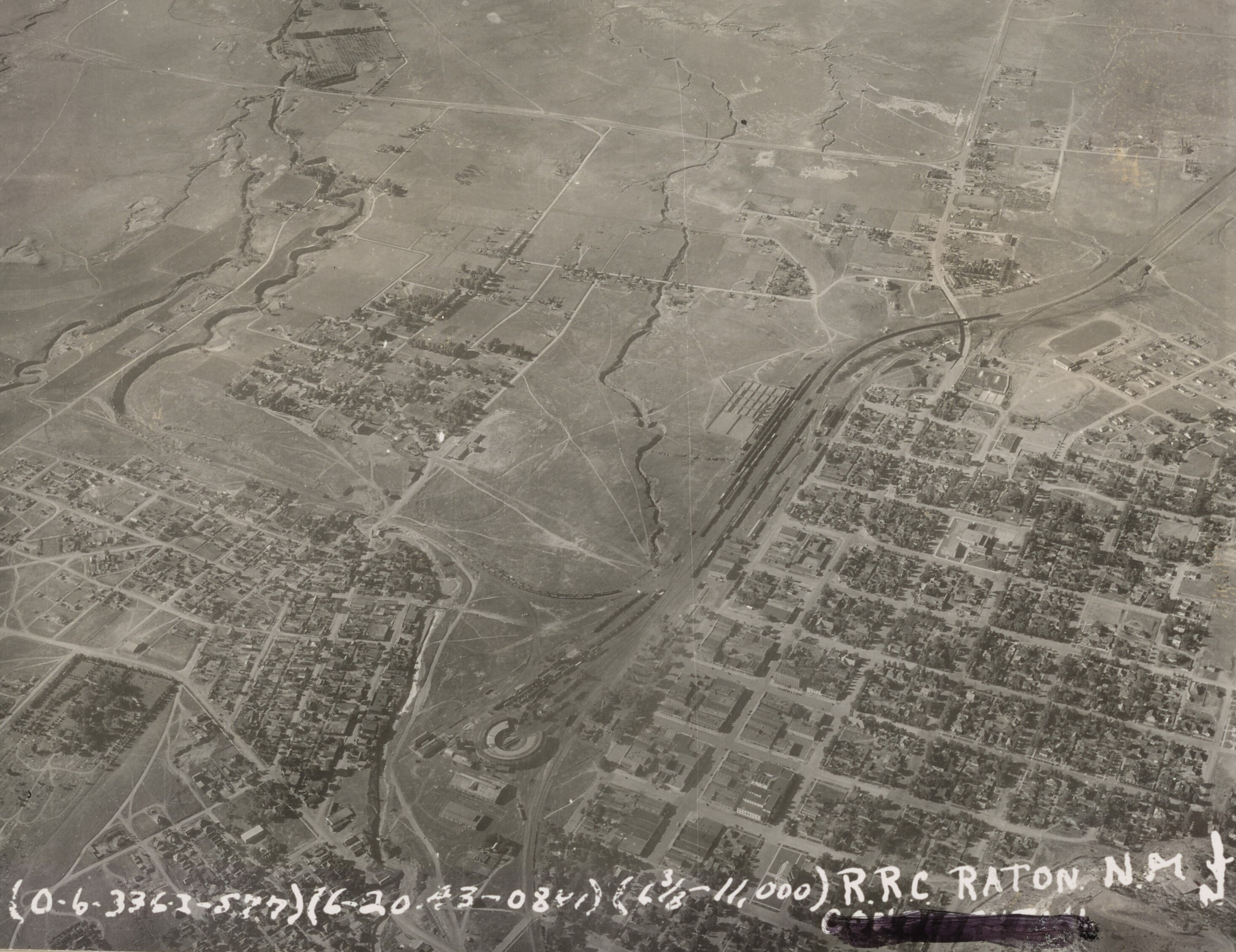
AT&SF rail yard in Raton, 1943

Ratón is Spanish for mouse.

Raton Pass had been used by Spanish explorers and Native Americans for centuries to cut through the rugged Rocky Mountains, and the mountain branch of the Santa Fe Trail cuts through the city, along what is now Business I-25.

The post office at this location was named Willow Springs from 1877 to 1879, Otero from 1879 to 1880, then renamed Raton in 1880.

Raton was founded at the site of Willow Springs, a stop on the Santa Fe Trail. The original 320 acres (129.5 ha) for the Raton townsite were purchased from the Maxwell Land Grant in 1880. In 1879, the Atchison, Topeka and Santa Fe Railway bought a local toll road and established a busy rail line. Raton quickly developed as a railroad, mining, and ranching center for the northeast part of the New Mexico territory, as well as the county seat and principal trading center of the area.

== Geography ==
According to the United States Census Bureau, the city has a total area of 8.0 square miles (20.6 km^{2}), all land. The Raton Range and Raton Peak are located immediately north of the town. The Raton Range is a 75-mile-long (121 km) ridge that extends east from the Sangre de Cristo Mountains. Raton Pass and the Raton Basin are also named for the Raton Range.

=== Geology ===
The Cretaceous–Paleogene boundary, also known as the K-Pg or K-T boundary, or the iridium layer, can be viewed in Raton. A well-preserved sequence of rocks spans the K-T boundary in Climax Canyon Park in Raton. The rocks have been studied for evidence of the iridium anomaly cited as evidence of a large meteorite impact at the end of the Cretaceous. It is interpreted to have caused the Cretaceous–Paleogene extinction event, which killed off dinosaurs and many other species of flora and fauna 66 million years ago.

=== Climate ===
Raton has a cold, semiarid (BSk) climate under the Köppen climate classification.

Climate data for Raton Filter Plant, New Mexico, 1991–2020 normals, extremes 1894–present
Month	Jan	Feb	Mar	Apr	May	Jun	Jul	Aug	Sep	Oct	Nov	Dec	Year
Record high °F (°C)	75 (24)	80 (27)	84 (29)	90 (32)	98 (37)	102 (39)	104 (40)	102 (39)	100 (38)	93 (34)	86 (30)	75 (24)	104 (40)
Mean maximum °F (°C)	63.9 (17.7)	65.1 (18.4)	71.4 (21.9)	76.5 (24.7)	83.9 (28.8)	90.8 (32.7)	91.6 (33.1)	89.2 (31.8)	85.8 (29.9)	80.4 (26.9)	70.3 (21.3)	63.2 (17.3)	93.1 (33.9)
Mean daily maximum °F (°C)	45.1 (7.3)	46.9 (8.3)	53.6 (12.0)	59.5 (15.3)	68.5 (20.3)	78.1 (25.6)	81.4 (27.4)	79.1 (26.2)	73.5 (23.1)	63.8 (17.7)	52.6 (11.4)	44.6 (7.0)	62.2 (16.8)
Daily mean °F (°C)	33.0 (0.6)	34.5 (1.4)	40.6 (4.8)	46.4 (8.0)	55.7 (13.2)	65.1 (18.4)	68.9 (20.5)	67.1 (19.5)	61.0 (16.1)	50.8 (10.4)	40.7 (4.8)	32.9 (0.5)	49.7 (9.9)
Mean daily minimum °F (°C)	20.8 (−6.2)	22.0 (−5.6)	27.7 (−2.4)	33.3 (0.7)	42.8 (6.0)	52.0 (11.1)	56.4 (13.6)	55.2 (12.9)	48.5 (9.2)	37.8 (3.2)	28.8 (−1.8)	21.1 (−6.1)	37.2 (2.9)
Mean minimum °F (°C)	4.4 (−15.3)	6.0 (−14.4)	12.1 (−11.1)	19.8 (−6.8)	29.9 (−1.2)	42.0 (5.6)	48.9 (9.4)	48.8 (9.3)	35.9 (2.2)	20.7 (−6.3)	11.2 (−11.6)	4.9 (−15.1)	1.7 (−16.8)
Record low °F (°C)	−26 (−32)	−14 (−26)	−4 (−20)	6 (−14)	20 (−7)	30 (−1)	31 (−1)	40 (4)	24 (−4)	5 (−15)	−8 (−22)	−10 (−23)	−26 (−32)
Average precipitation inches (mm)	0.51 (13)	0.43 (11)	1.21 (31)	1.27 (32)	2.09 (53)	1.96 (50)	3.50 (89)	3.49 (89)	1.61 (41)	1.32 (34)	0.59 (15)	0.62 (16)	18.60 (472)
Average snowfall inches (cm)	5.7 (14)	4.3 (11)	5.8 (15)	1.9 (4.8)	0.3 (0.76)	0.0 (0.0)	0.0 (0.0)	0.0 (0.0)	0.0 (0.0)	1.7 (4.3)	3.8 (9.7)	5.3 (13)	28.8 (72.56)
Average precipitation days (≥ 0.01 in)	3.5	3.5	5.3	6.0	7.2	9.0	12.1	12.4	7.4	4.8	3.4	4.0	78.6
Average snowy days (≥ 0.1 in)	3.1	2.4	2.9	1.6	0.2	0.0	0.0	0.0	0.0	0.8	2.0	2.7	15.7
Source 1: NOAA
Source 2: xmACIS2

Climate data for Raton Municipal Airport, New Mexico, 1991–2020 normals, extremes 1946–present
Month	Jan	Feb	Mar	Apr	May	Jun	Jul	Aug	Sep	Oct	Nov	Dec	Year
Record high °F (°C)	76 (24)	76 (24)	88 (31)	90 (32)	96 (36)	102 (39)	102 (39)	100 (38)	97 (36)	88 (31)	81 (27)	76 (24)	102 (39)
Mean daily maximum °F (°C)	46.7 (8.2)	49.9 (9.9)	57.7 (14.3)	65.2 (18.4)	74.3 (23.5)	83.6 (28.7)	86.8 (30.4)	84.6 (29.2)	78.1 (25.6)	67.6 (19.8)	55.1 (12.8)	46.1 (7.8)	66.3 (19.1)
Daily mean °F (°C)	30.5 (−0.8)	33.7 (0.9)	40.4 (4.7)	48.1 (8.9)	57.2 (14.0)	66.5 (19.2)	70.6 (21.4)	68.6 (20.3)	61.7 (16.5)	50.6 (10.3)	38.7 (3.7)	30.2 (−1.0)	49.7 (9.8)
Mean daily minimum °F (°C)	14.3 (−9.8)	17.6 (−8.0)	23.0 (−5.0)	31.0 (−0.6)	40.1 (4.5)	49.4 (9.7)	54.4 (12.4)	52.6 (11.4)	45.3 (7.4)	33.6 (0.9)	22.4 (−5.3)	14.3 (−9.8)	33.2 (0.6)
Record low °F (°C)	−31 (−35)	−22 (−30)	−14 (−26)	4 (−16)	17 (−8)	32 (0)	43 (6)	41 (5)	25 (−4)	2 (−17)	−10 (−23)	−20 (−29)	−31 (−35)
Average precipitation inches (mm)	0.37 (9.4)	0.32 (8.1)	0.81 (21)	1.03 (26)	1.06 (27)	1.67 (42)	2.62 (67)	2.32 (59)	1.79 (45)	0.92 (23)	0.46 (12)	0.36 (9.1)	13.73 (348.6)
Average precipitation days (≥ 0.01 in)	5.4	5.5	5.7	6.2	7.0	7.5	11.5	10.3	7.6	5.7	4.4	4.9	81.7
Source 1: NOAA
Source 2: xmACIS2

== Demographics ==
Historical population
Census	Pop.	Note	%±
1890	1,255		—
1900	3,540		182.1%
1910	4,539		28.2%
1920	5,544		22.1%
1930	6,090		9.8%
1940	7,607		24.9%
1950	8,241		8.3%
1960	8,146		−1.2%
1970	6,962		−14.5%
1980	8,225		18.1%
1990	7,372		−10.4%
2000	7,282		−1.2%
2010	6,885		−5.5%
2020	6,041		−12.3%
U.S. Decennial Census

=== 2020 census ===
As of the 2020 census, Raton had a population of 6,041. The median age was 47.1 years; 20.0% of its residents were under 18 and 24.5% were 65 or older. For every 100 females, there were 98.5 males, and for every 100 females 18 and over, there were 97.0 males 18 and over.

About 92.9% of residents lived in urban areas, while 7.1% lived in rural areas.

Of the 2,669 households in Raton, 23.4% had children under 18 living in them, 33.8% were married-couple households, 24.1% were households with a male householder and no spouse or partner present, and 32.9% were households with a female householder and no spouse or partner present. About 39.0% of all households were made up of individuals, and 18.1% had someone living alone who was 65 age or older.

The city had 3,286 housing units, of which 18.8% were vacant. The homeowner vacancy rate was 3.4% and the rental vacancy rate was 7.9%.

Racial composition as of the 2020 census
Race	Number	Percentage
White	3,750	62.1%
Black or African American	18	0.3%
American Indian and Alaska Native	115	1.9%
Asian	29	0.5%
Native Hawaiian and other Pacific Islander	6	0.1%
Some other race	807	13.4%
Two or more races	1,316	21.8%
Hispanic or Latino (of any race)	3,528	58.4%

=== 2010 census ===
In the 2010 United States census, the population of Raton was 6,885.

=== 2000 census ===
As of the 2000 census, 7,282 people, 3,035 households, and 1,981 families were residing in the city. The population density was 992 inhabitants per square mile (383/km^{2}). The 3,472 housing units averaged of 473.2 per square mile (182.6/km^{2}). The racial makeup of the city was 78.04% White, 0.23% African American, 1.59% Native American, 0.40% Asian, 16.20% from other races, and 3.53% from two or more races. Hispanics or Latinos of any race were 56.96% of the population.

Of the 3,035 households, 30.7% had children under 18 living with them, 47.0% were married couples living together, 12.9% had a female householder with no husband present, and 34.7% were not families. About 30.6% of all households were made up of individuals, and 14.1% had someone living alone who was 65 or older. The average household size was 2.35, and the average family size was 2.92.

In the city, the age distribution was 25.1% under 18, 7.8% from 18 to 24, 24.9% from 25 to 44, 23.9% from 45 to 64, and 18.4% who were 65 or older. The median age was 40 years. For every 100 females, there were 94.5 males. For every 100 females 18 and over, there were 92.1 males.

The median income in the city for a household was $27,028 and for a family was $31,762. Males had a median income of $24,946 versus $18,433 for females. The per capita income for the city was $14,223. About 14.8% of families and 17.4% of the population were below the poverty line, including 25.2% of those under 18 and 10.4% of those 65 or over.

== Parks and recreation ==
Run to Raton, a motorcycle rally that includes camp-outs, vendors, free music, and a pin-up contest, takes place every July.

Raton was the site of New Mexico's first horse racetrack, La Mesa Park, which closed in 1992.

Raton hosts the International Balloon Rally, a hot-air balloon gathering, held on the Fourth of July weekend.

== Infrastructure ==
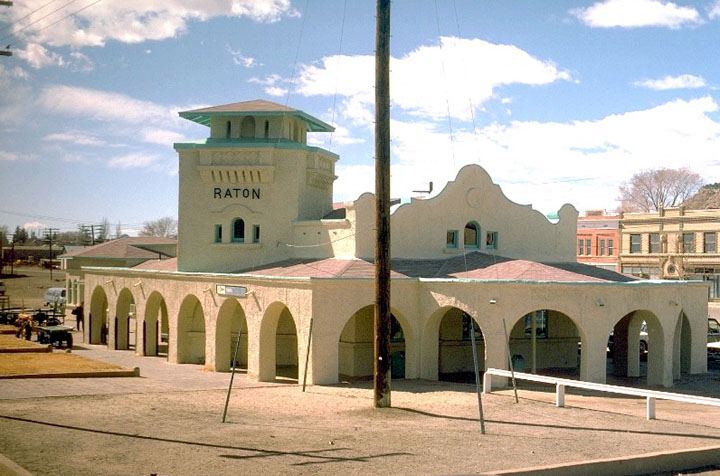
Amtrak station

=== Transportation ===
==== Roads ====
- I-25
- US 64
- US 87

==== Rail ====
- Raton Amtrak Station is a stop on the Southwest Chief route.

==== Air ====
- Raton Municipal Airport

== Notable people ==
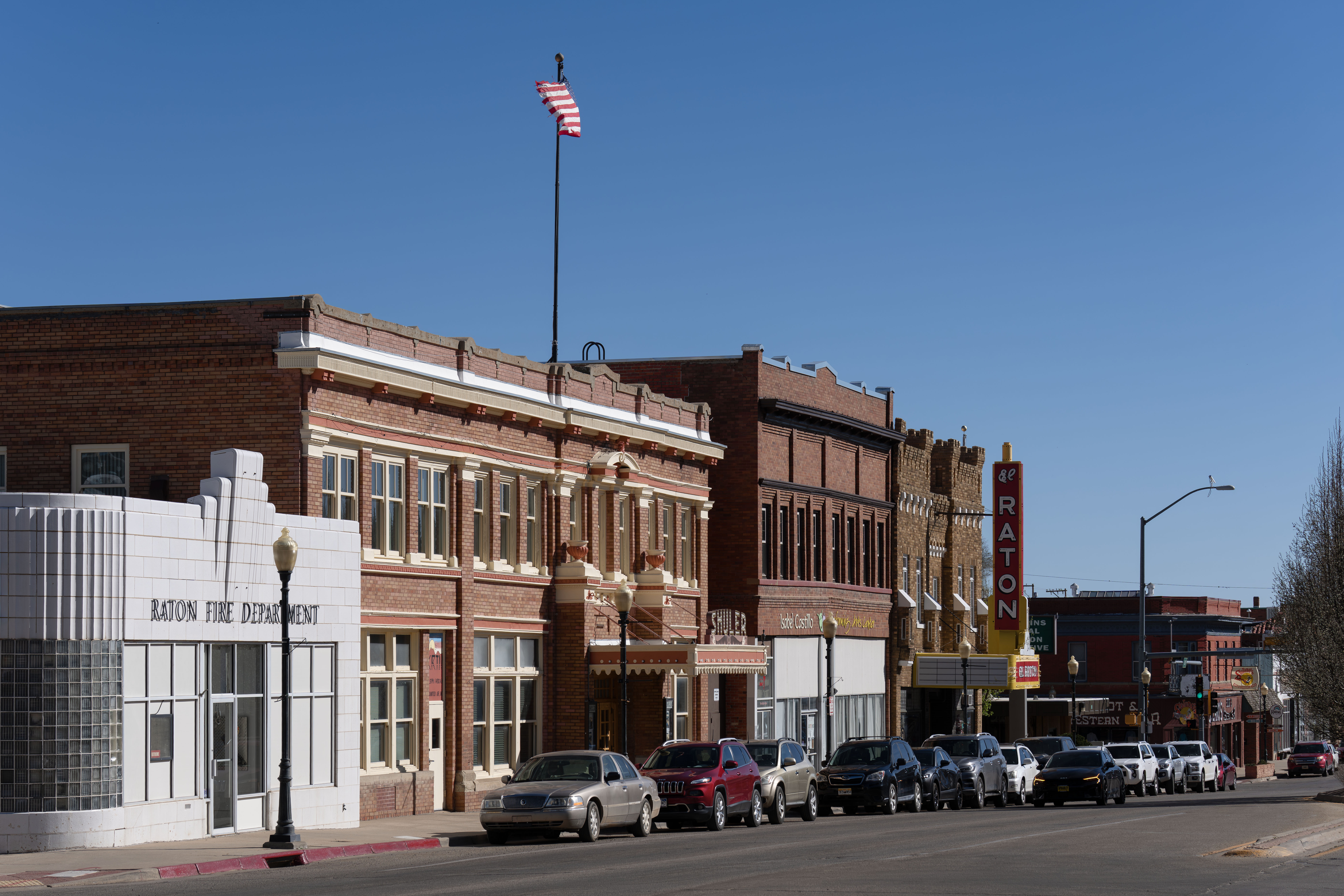
Historic buildings along Second Street

- Tom W. Blackburn, writer who also wrote the lyrics to "The Ballad of Davy Crockett"
- Edwin Fullinwider, Olympic fencer
- Noel Mazzone, former offensive coordinator for the University of Arizona football team, current offensive coordinator for New Orleans Breakers of the new USFL
- Paul L. Modrich, recipient of the Nobel Prize in Chemistry (2015)
- John Morrow, United States representative from New Mexico
- John R. Sinnock, chief engraver for the United States Mint, designer of the FDR dime and Franklin half dollar
- Petro Vlahos, three-time Academy Award-winning Hollywood special-effects pioneer
- Robert W. Warren, Attorney General of Wisconsin
- Bennie L. Woolley, Jr., racehorse trainer whose horse won the 2009 Kentucky Derby
- The Fireballs, rock-and-roll group (hit song "Bottle of Wine"), originated in Raton

== See also ==
- Folsom Falls
- Johnson Mesa
- Maxwell Land Grant
- National Old Trails Road
- Raton Downtown Historic District
