= National Register of Historic Places listings in Mora County, New Mexico =

Location of Mora County in New Mexico

This is a list of the National Register of Historic Places listings in Mora County, New Mexico.

This is intended to be a complete list of the properties and districts on the National Register of Historic Places in Mora County, New Mexico, United States. Latitude and longitude coordinates are provided for many National Register properties and districts; these locations may be seen together in a map.

There are 23 properties and districts listed on the National Register in the county, including 2 National Historic Landmarks. All of the places within the county on the National Register are also listed on the State Register of Cultural Properties.

This National Park Service list is complete through NPS recent listings posted May 22, 2026.

Contents: NRHP in New Mexico by county
Bernalillo – Catron – Chaves – Cibola – Colfax – Curry – De Baca – Doña Ana – Eddy – Grant – Guadalupe – Harding – Hidalgo – Lea – Lincoln – Los Alamos – Luna – McKinley – Mora – Otero – Quay – Rio Arriba – Roosevelt – San Juan – San Miguel – Sandoval – Santa Fe – Sierra – Socorro – Taos – Torrance – Union – Valencia

== Current listings ==
| | Name on the Register | Image | Date listed | Location | City or town | Description |
|---|---|---|---|---|---|---|
| 1 | Cassidy Mill | Cassidy Mill | December 6, 1978 (#78001818) | Southeast of Cleveland off State Road 3; 35°59′08″N 105°21′29″W | Cleveland | |
| 2 | Daniel Cassidy and Sons General Merchandise Store | Daniel Cassidy and Sons General Merchandise Store | August 1, 1979 (#79001541) | State Road 518; 35°59′41″N 105°22′16″W | Cleveland | |
| 3 | Daniel Cassidy House | Daniel Cassidy House | July 27, 1990 (#90001062) | Address Restricted | Mora | |
| 4 | James J. Cassidy House | James J. Cassidy House | September 1, 2005 (#05000943) | Address Restricted | Cleveland | |
| 5 | Fort Union National Monument | Fort Union National Monument | October 15, 1966 (#66000044) | 9 miles north of Watrous on State Road 477; 35°54′26″N 105°01′06″W | Watrous | |
| 6 | Garcia House | Garcia House | December 24, 1990 (#90001063) | Address Restricted | Mora | |
| 7 | Gordon-Sanchez Mill | Gordon-Sanchez Mill | July 27, 1990 (#90001061) | Address Restricted | Mora | |
| 8 | Guadalupita-Coyote Rural Historic District | Guadalupita-Coyote Rural Historic District | June 5, 2017 (#100001034) | Village of Guadalupita, parts of Guadalupita and Williams canyons, and the Coyote Creek valley between Guadalupita and Lucero; 36°08′17″N 105°14′17″W | Guadalupita | |
| 9 | La Cueva Historic District | La Cueva Historic District | May 25, 1973 (#73001144) | 6 miles southeast of Mora at the junction of State Roads 3 and 21; 35°56′34″N 105°14′51″W | Mora | |
| 10 | Ledoux Rural Historic District | Ledoux Rural Historic District | December 24, 1990 (#90001057) | Address Restricted | Ledoux | |
| 11 | Mora Historic District | Mora Historic District | December 24, 1990 (#90001056) | Address Restricted | Mora | |
| 12 | North Carmen Historic District | North Carmen Historic District | December 24, 1990 (#90001058) | Address Restricted | Ledoux | |
| 13 | Ocate Creek Crossing and the Santa Fe Trail-Mora County Trail Segments | | April 21, 1994 (#94000329) | 1.75 miles north of the junction of State Road 127 and the road to Mora Ranch; 36°09′02″N 104°54′03″W | Ocate | |
| 14 | Jose Olquin Barn-Corral Complex | Jose Olquin Barn-Corral Complex | December 24, 1990 (#90001060) | Address Restricted | Mora | |
| 15 | Santa Clara Hotel | Santa Clara Hotel | May 16, 1991 (#91000602) | 111 Railroad Ave. 36°00′30″N 104°42′22″W | Wagon Mound | |
| 16 | St. Vrain's Mill | St. Vrain's Mill | August 28, 1973 (#73001143) | On State Road 38; 35°58′32″N 105°19′44″W | Mora | |
| 17 | J. P. Strong Store | J. P. Strong Store | July 27, 1979 (#79001542) | State Roads 120 and 442; 36°10′31″N 105°02′55″W | Ocate | An excellent example of a crossroads general store in the southwest |
| 18 | Tipton-Black Willow Ranch Historic District | | June 29, 2001 (#00001287) | 3 miles east of Watrous; 35°47′28″N 104°55′34″W | Watrous | |
| 19 | Desiderio Valdez House | Desiderio Valdez House | December 24, 1990 (#90001059) | Address Restricted | Cleveland | |
| 20 | Narciso Valdez House | Narciso Valdez House | July 11, 1980 (#80004484) | State Road 120; 36°10′34″N 105°02′55″W | Ocate | Adobe house with Queen Anne style, particularly in its interior. |
| 21 | Valmora Sanatorium Historic District | | March 23, 1995 (#95000286) | State Road 97, 4 miles east of its junction with State Road 161, northeast of Watrous; 35°49′01″N 104°55′27″W | Watrous | Hospital (1920) and eight other buildings of historic cottage-plan tuberculosis sanatorium. |
| 22 | Wagon Mound | Wagon Mound | October 15, 1966 (#66000478) | East of Wagon Mound on U.S. Route 85; 36°00′39″N 104°42′10″W | Wagon Mound | |
| 23 | Watrous | Watrous | October 15, 1966 (#66000480) | U.S. Route 85; 35°48′03″N 105°00′05″W | Watrous | |

== See also ==
- List of National Historic Landmarks in New Mexico
- National Register of Historic Places listings in New Mexico
