= Daniel Cassidy House =

Historic house in New Mexico, United States

- U.S. National Register of Historic Places
- NM State Register of Cultural Properties
- Nearest city: Mora, New Mexico
- Area: less than one acre
- Built: 1921
- Architectural style: Hipped Cottage
- MPS: Upland Valleys of Western Mora County MPS
- NRHP reference No.: 90001062
- NMSRCP No.: 1529

Significant dates
- Added to NRHP: July 27, 1990
- Designated NMSRCP: May 18, 1990

The Daniel Cassidy House near Mora, New Mexico was built in 1921. It was listed on the National Register of Historic Places (NRHP) in 1990.

It was listed as part of a 1989 study of historic resources in western Mora County. Dan Cassidy provided papers, photographs and/or other information to the study.

The related Daniel Cassidy and Sons General Merchandise Store, Cassidy Mill, and James J. Cassidy House, are also listed on the National Register.

== See also ==
- National Register of Historic Places listings in Mora County, New Mexico
