= Watrous (La Junta) =

- U.S. National Register of Historic Places
- U.S. National Historic Landmark District
- NM State Register of Cultural Properties
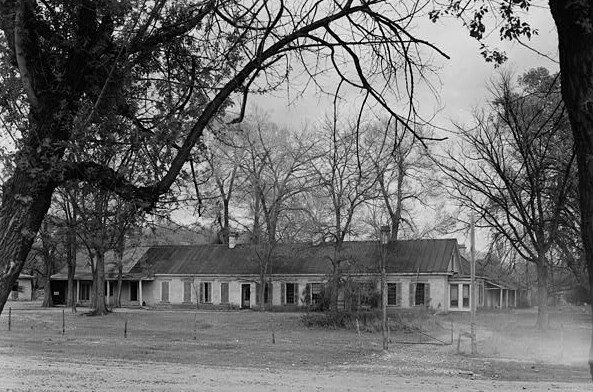
- Watrous House in 1940

- Location within New Mexico Location within the United States
- Location: US 85, Watrous, New Mexico
- Coordinates: 35°48′3″N 105°0′5″W
- Area: 3,580 acres (14.5 km^{2})
- Built: 1879
- Architectural style: Territorial Style
- NRHP reference No.: 66000480
- NMSRCP No.: 33

Significant dates
- Added to NRHP: October 15, 1966
- Designated NHLD: May 23, 1963
- Designated NMSRCP: December 20, 1968

Watrous, also named La Junta, is a National Historic Landmark District near Watrous, New Mexico. It encompasses the historic junction point of the two major branches of the Santa Fe Trail, a major 19th-century frontier settlement route between St. Louis, Missouri and Santa Fe, New Mexico. La Junta, marked this junction point, as well as the first major indications of civilization before westbound travelers reached Santa Fe. The district includes a large area west of the modern community of Watrous, encompassing the confluence of the Mora and Sapello Rivers. Surviving buildings include the houses of early ranchers, as well as a stagecoach mailstop and inn. The district was designated a National Historic Landmark in 1963.

== Description and history ==
The Santa Fe Trail was one of the major routes by which the American West was settled. It had two major branches: the Mountain Branch, which skirted north of the Sangre de Cristo Mountains and crossed southward at Raton Pass, and the Cimarron Cutoff, which ran a more direct route south of mountains but across desert that was also populated by hostile Native Americans. These two routes came together to the west of the confluence of the Mora and Sapello Rivers, which is just north of present-day Watrous. The Santa Fe Trail remained in use until the 1870s, when it was supplanted by Atchison, Topeka and Santa Fe Railway, whose route roughly follows the Cimarron Cutoff route. The railroad established the present-day community of Watrous east of the trail junction, after which the small community there was largely abandoned.

The community at the trail junction was known as La Junta ("the junction" in Spanish), Tiptonville, or Watrous, the latter two based on the names of two early ranchers in the area, Samuel Watrous and William Tipton. There are 21 surviving structures or foundational remains in the district, most of which were built before 1870. Important surviving structures include the ranch house and store of Samuel Watrous (now on the Watrous Valley Ranch), a similar building belonging to William Tipton, and the rancho house of William Koenig. The Koenig House, built in the 1860s on what is now known as the Phoenix Ranch, is one of the state's finest examples of Territorial architecture. There are also three small cemeteries, and the remains of three structures associated with a horse corral managed by Fort Union.

== See also ==
- National Register of Historic Places listings in Mora County, New Mexico
- List of National Historic Landmarks in New Mexico
