= Garcia House (Mora, New Mexico) =

Historic house in New Mexico, United States

- U.S. National Register of Historic Places
- NM State Register of Cultural Properties
- Nearest city: Mora, New Mexico
- Area: less than one acre
- Built: 1865
- Architectural style: Vernacular New Mexico
- MPS: Upland Valleys of Western Mora County MPS
- NRHP reference No.: 90001063
- NMSRCP No.: 1525

Significant dates
- Added to NRHP: December 24, 1990
- Designated NMSRCP: May 18, 1990

Garcia House near Mora, New Mexico was built in 1865 and was listed on the National Register of Historic Places in 1990.

It is a vernacular dwelling of type compatible for historic listing as part of a 1989 study of historic resources in western Mora County.

== See also ==
- National Register of Historic Places listings in Mora County, New Mexico
