= Ojo Feliz, New Mexico =

- Unincorporated community
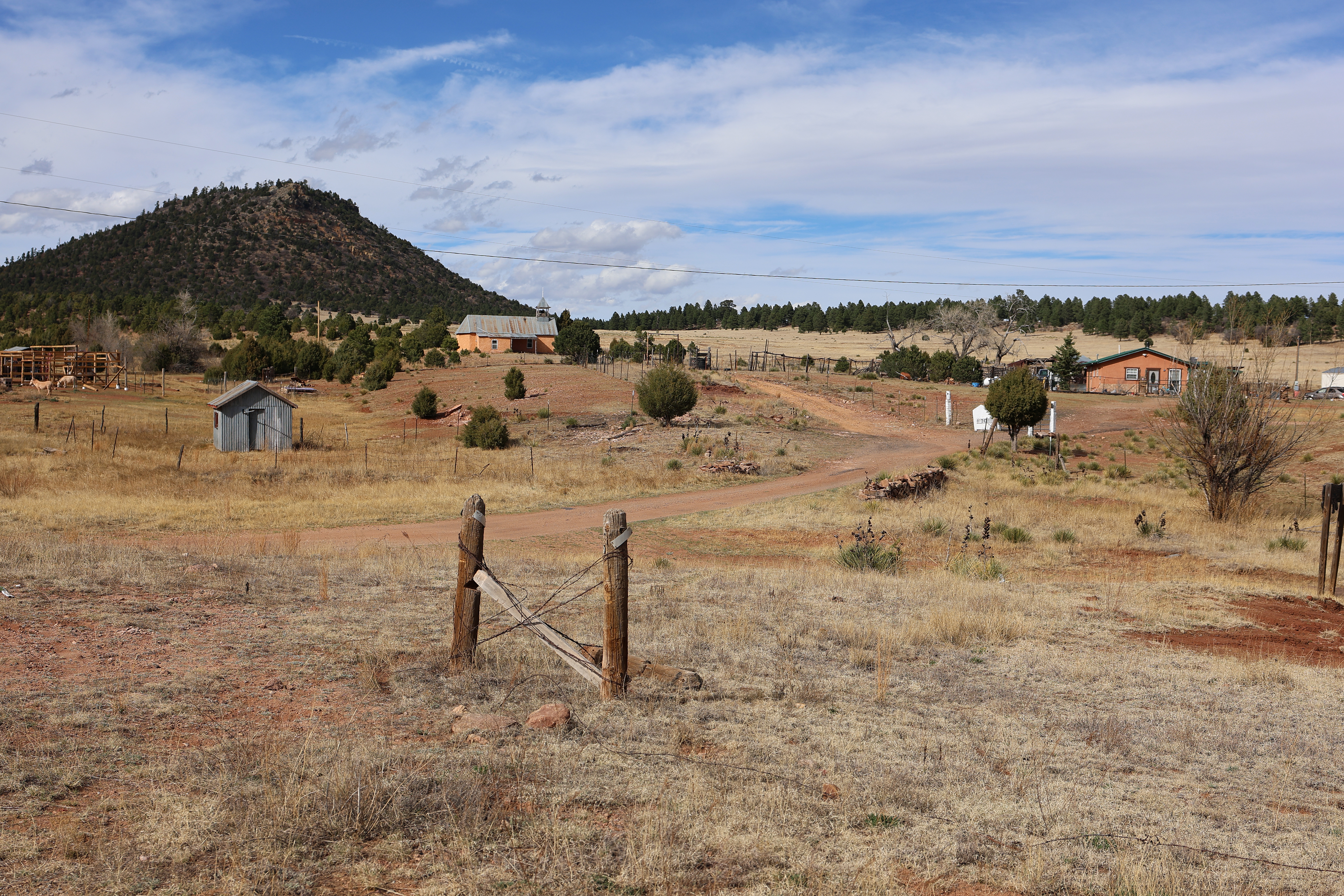
- Looking acros Ojo Feliz towards the community's church. The mountain in the picture is Cerro del Amole

- Location within New Mexico Location within the United States
- Coordinates: 36°03′28″N 105°07′06″W
- Country: United States
- State: New Mexico
- County: Mora
- Elevation: 7,539 ft (2,298 m)
- Time zone: UTC-7 (Mountain (MST))
  - Summer (DST): UTC-6 (MDT)
- ZIP codes: 87735
- Area code: 575
- GNIS feature ID: 899819

Ojo Feliz is an unincorporated community located in Mora County, New Mexico, United States. The community is located near New Mexico State Road 442, 13.2 miles (21.2 km) east-northeast of Mora.
