= La Cueva Historic District =

Historic district in New Mexico, United States

- U.S. National Register of Historic Places
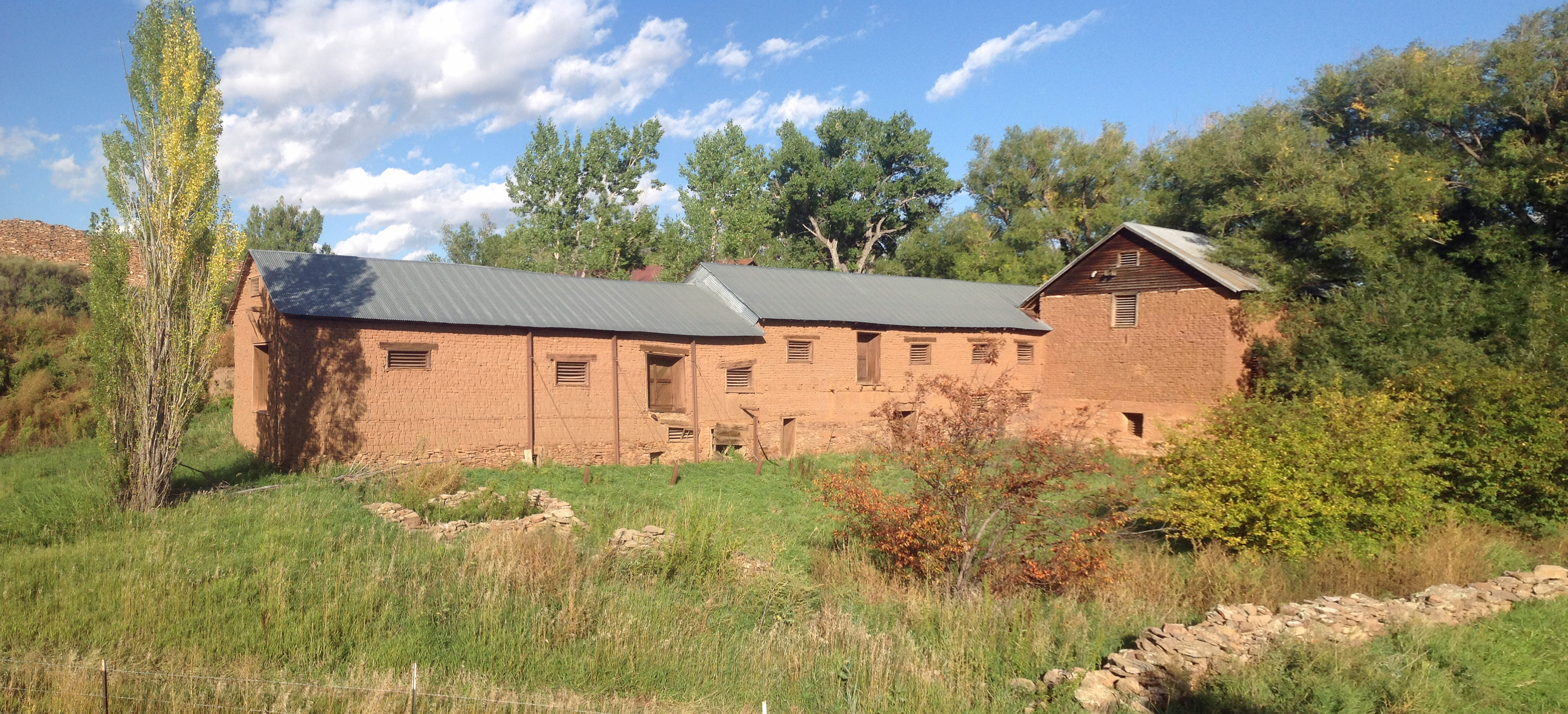
- Mill and warehouse

- Location within New Mexico
- Nearest city: Mora, New Mexico
- Coordinates: 35°56′34″N 105°14′51″W
- Area: 47 acres (19 ha)
- Built: c.1870
- Built by: Vicente Romero
- NRHP reference No.: 73001144
- Added to NRHP: May 25, 1973

La Cueva Historic District, in Mora County, New Mexico near Mora, New Mexico, is a historic district which was listed on the National Register of Historic Places in 1973. The listing included five contributing buildings on 47 acres (19 ha).

It is located about 6 miles (9.7 km) southeast of Mora at the junction of New Mexico State Road 3 and New Mexico State Road 21.

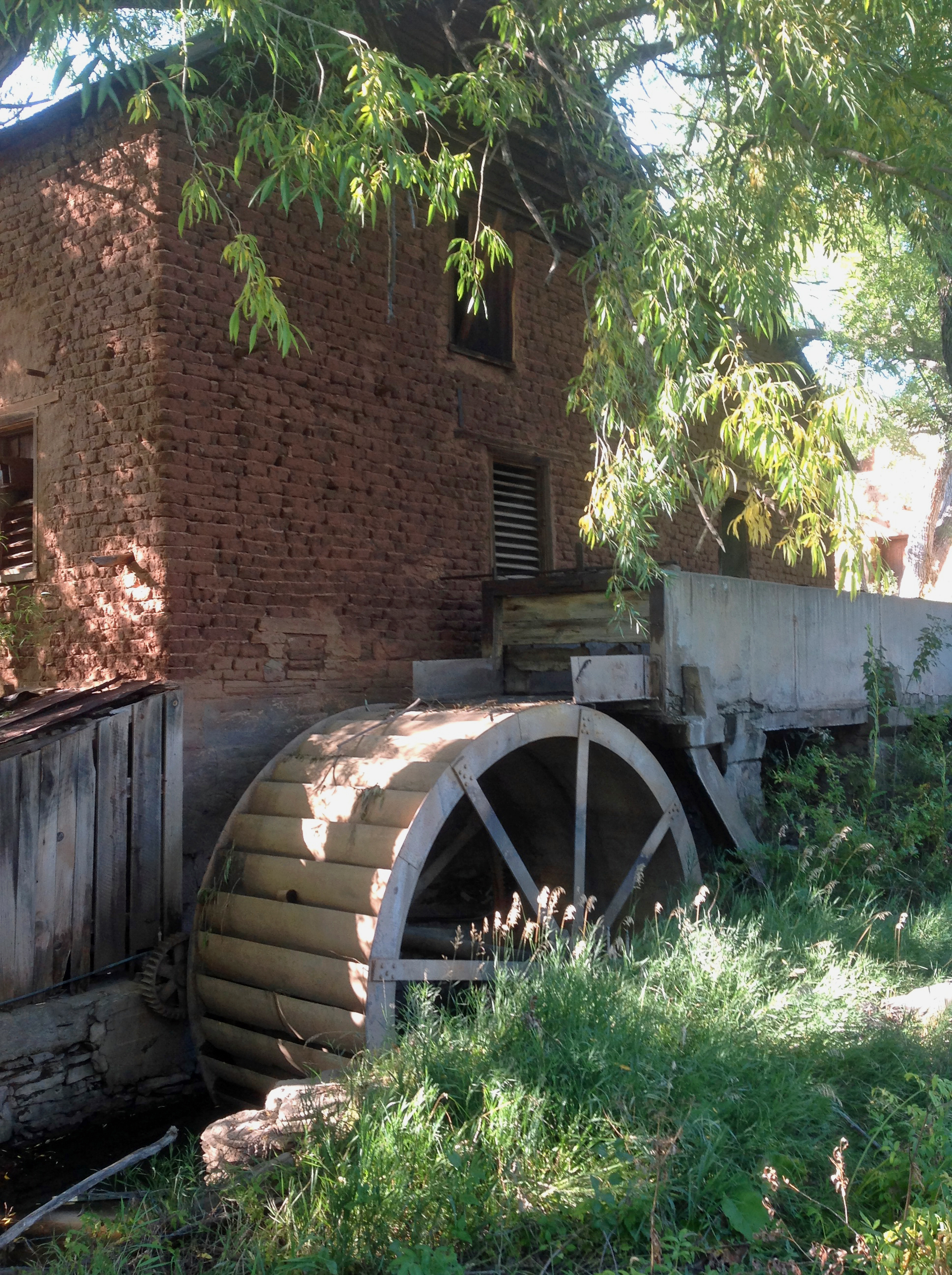
Mill, in 2014

La Cueva Ranch was founded around 1851 by Vicente Romero.

The district includes a gristmill, a mercantile store and storage buildings, a ranch house and its out buildings, and San Rafael Church. The two-story home was built in the 1850s by/for Vicente Romero. The La Cueva mill, probably built in the 1870s, is a two-story stone and adobe building, built upon a stone foundation.

Historic function: Domestic; Religion; Industry/processing/extraction; Commerce/trade Historic subfunction: Religious Structure; Single Dwelling; Manufacturing Facility; Specialty Store; Warehouse Criteria: event, architecture/engineering
