= New Mexico State Road 121 =

State highway in New Mexico, United States

State Road 121
- NM 121 highlighted in red

Route information
- Maintained by NMDOT
- Length: 8.581 mi (13.810 km)

Major junctions
- South end: NM 518 near Holman
- North end: End of state maintenance near Chacon

Location
- Country: United States
- State: New Mexico
- Counties: Mora

Highway system
- New Mexico State Highway System; Interstate; US; State; Scenic
← NM 120	→ NM 122

State Road 121 (NM 121) is a 8.6-mile-long (13.8 km) American state highway in Mora County, New Mexico. Its southern terminus is at NM 518 south of Holman, and its northern terminus is at the end of state maintenance near Chacon.

== Major intersections ==
County	Location	mi	km	Destinations	Notes
	0.000	0.000	NM 518	Southern terminus	
	8.581	13.810	End of state maintenance	Northern terminus	
1.000 mi = 1.609 km; 1.000 km = 0.621 mi
