= Tipton-Black Willow Ranch Historic District =

Historic district in New Mexico, United States

- U.S. National Register of Historic Places
- Location within New Mexico
- Nearest city: Watrous, New Mexico
- Coordinates: 35°47′28″N 104°55′34″W
- Area: 255 acres (103 ha)
- Built: 1862
- Built by: Tipton, Enoch; Tipton, Charles Q.
- Architectural style: Italianate
- NRHP reference No.: 00001287
- Added to NRHP: June 29, 2001

The Tipton-Black Willow Ranch Historic District, in Mora County and San Miguel County in New Mexico, near Watrous, dates from 1862. It was listed on the National Register of Historic Places in 2001. The listing included three contributing buildings, two contributing structures, five contributing objects, and a contributing site on 255 acres (103 ha).

Some part of it includes elements of Italianate style.

Some part of it is located about 3 miles (4.8 km) east of Watrous.

Enoch Tipton Ranch

Architect: Tipton, Enoch; Tipton, Charles Q. Architecture: Italianate Historic function: Domestic; Agriculture/subsistence; Funerary Historic subfunction: Single Dwelling; Agricultural Outbuildings; Irrigation Facility; Cemetery Criteria: event, architecture/engineering
