= Chacon, New Mexico =

- Unincorporated community
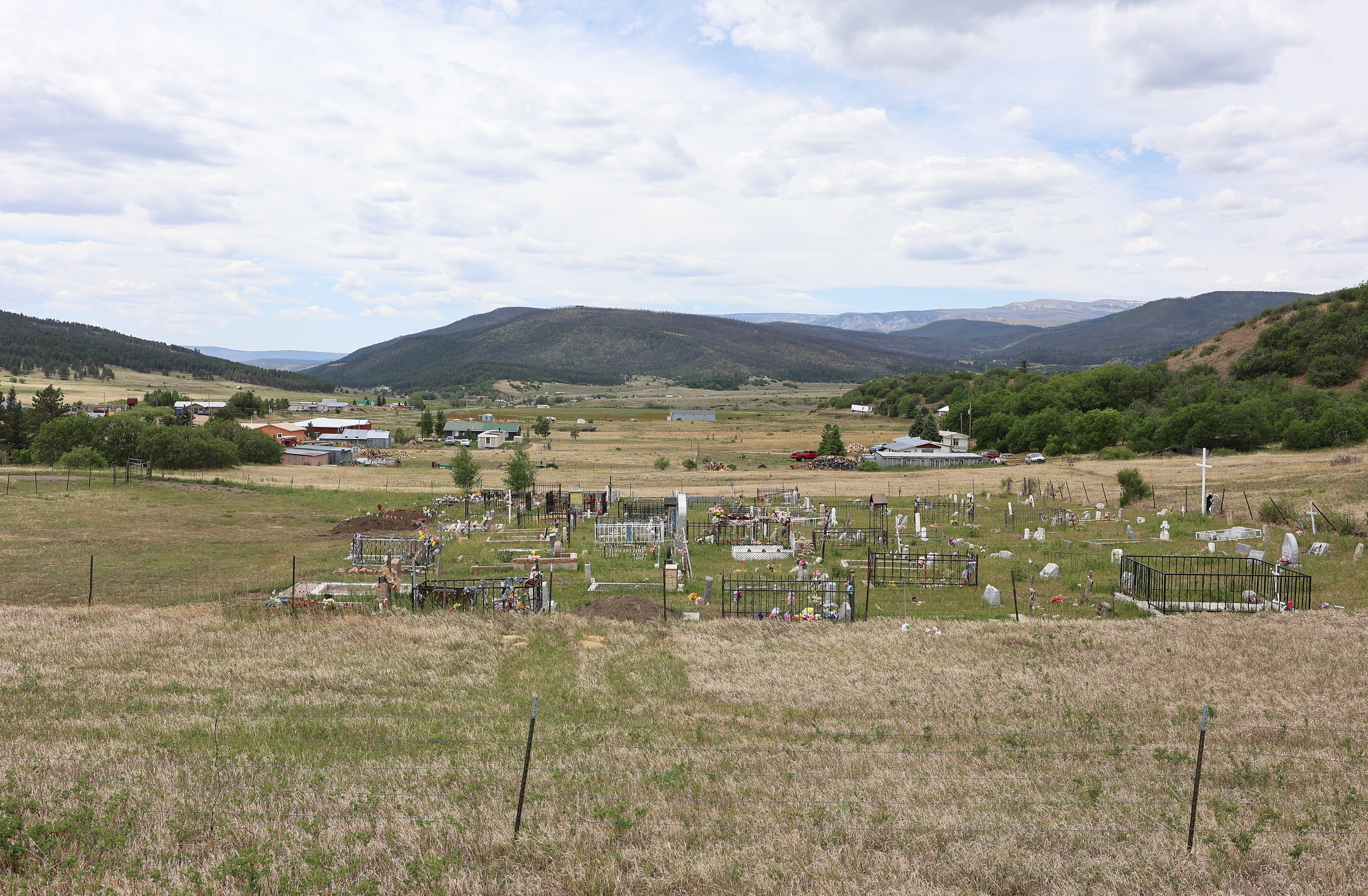
- Chacon and its cemetery (2026)

- Location within New Mexico Location within the United States
- Coordinates: 36°08′39″N 105°22′04″W
- Country: United States
- State: New Mexico
- County: Mora
- Elevation: 8,166 ft (2,489 m)
- Time zone: UTC-7 (Mountain (MST))
  - Summer (DST): UTC-6 (MDT)
- ZIP codes: 87713
- Area code: 575
- GNIS feature ID: 915811

Chacon is an unincorporated community located in Mora County, New Mexico, United States. The community is located on New Mexico State Road 121, 11.9 miles (19.2 km) north of Mora. Chacon has a post office with ZIP code 87713, which opened on September 10, 1894. It was named after its first postmaster, Diego Chacon. Harsh winters give the area the nickname "Little Alaska."
