= Rainsville, New Mexico =

Unincorporated community in New Mexico, United States

- Unincorporated community
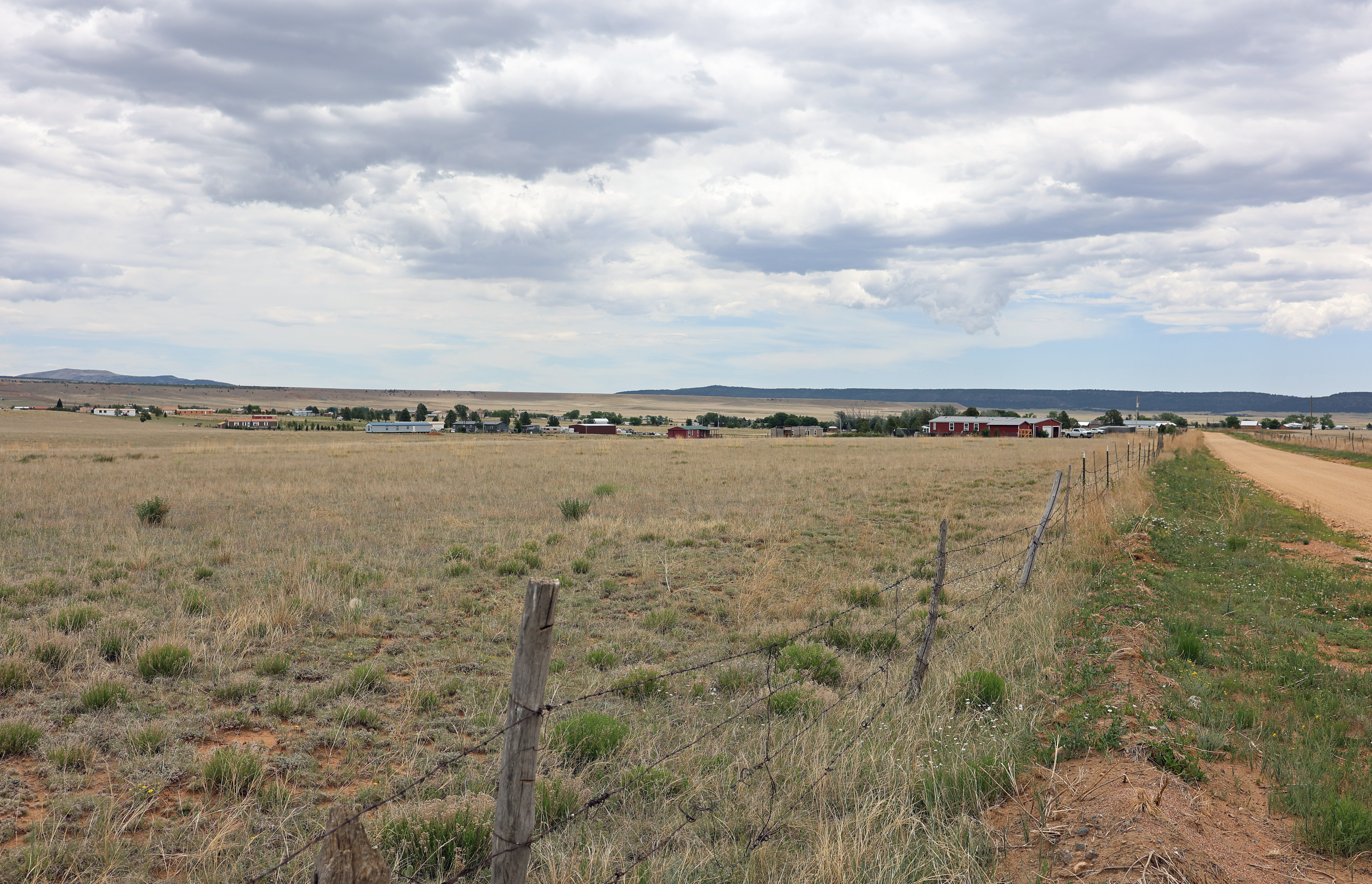
- Rainsville in 2026

- Location within New Mexico Location within the United States
- Coordinates: 35°58′43″N 105°12′33″W
- Country: United States
- State: New Mexico
- County: Mora
- Elevation: 7,044 ft (2,147 m)
- Time zone: UTC-7 (Mountain (MST))
  - Summer (DST): UTC-6 (MDT)
- ZIP codes: 87736
- Area code: 575
- GNIS feature ID: 899863

Rainsville is an unincorporated community located in Mora County, New Mexico, United States. The community is 6.7 miles (10.8 km) east of Mora. Rainsville has a post office with ZIP code 87736, which opened on July 8, 1920. Formerly known as Llano del Coyote, Rainsville took the name of its first postmaster, a Mr. Rains.
