= Mora Land Grant =

Coordinates: 35.9742°N 105.330°W

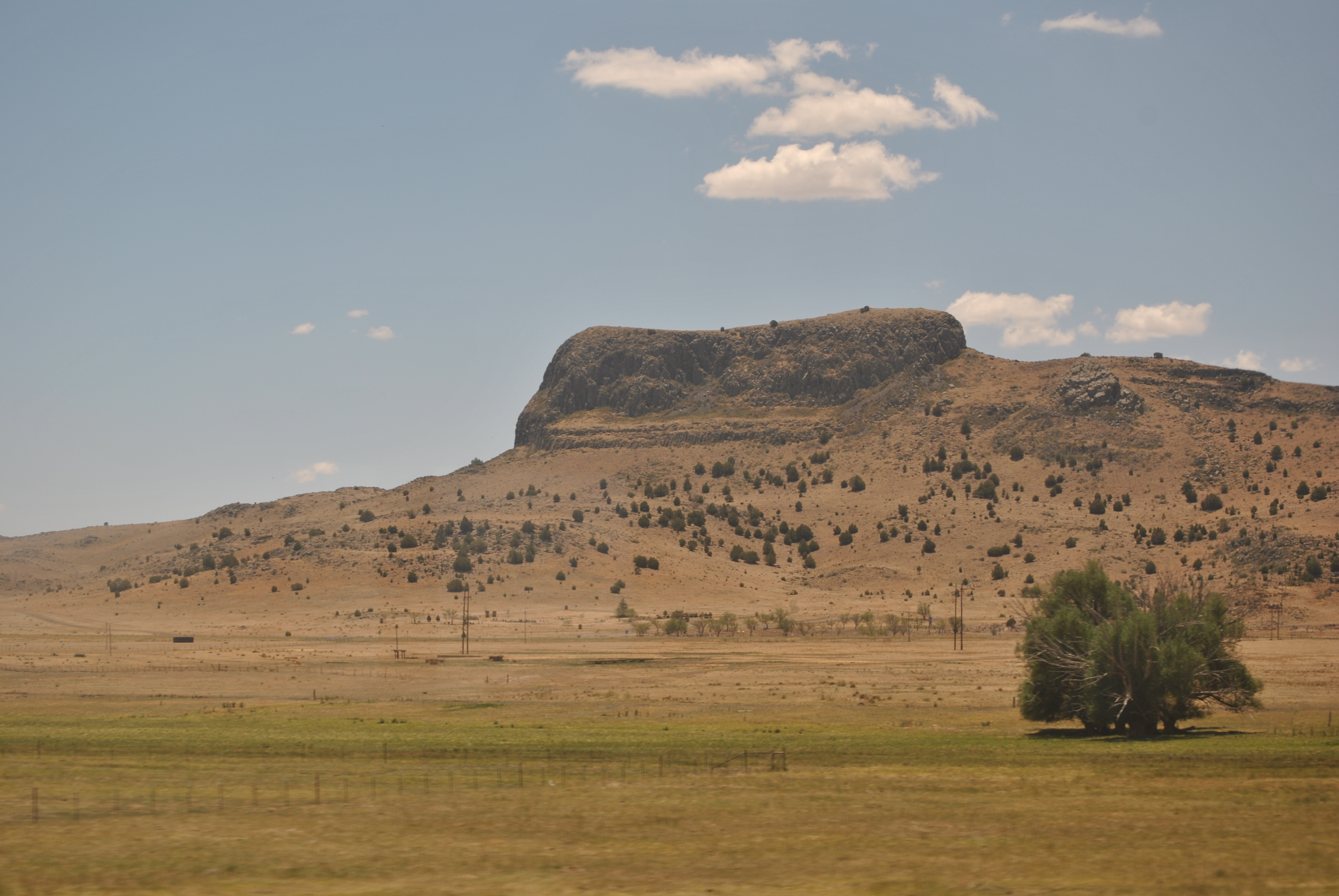
The grant lands begin on the Great Plains west of Wagon Mound.

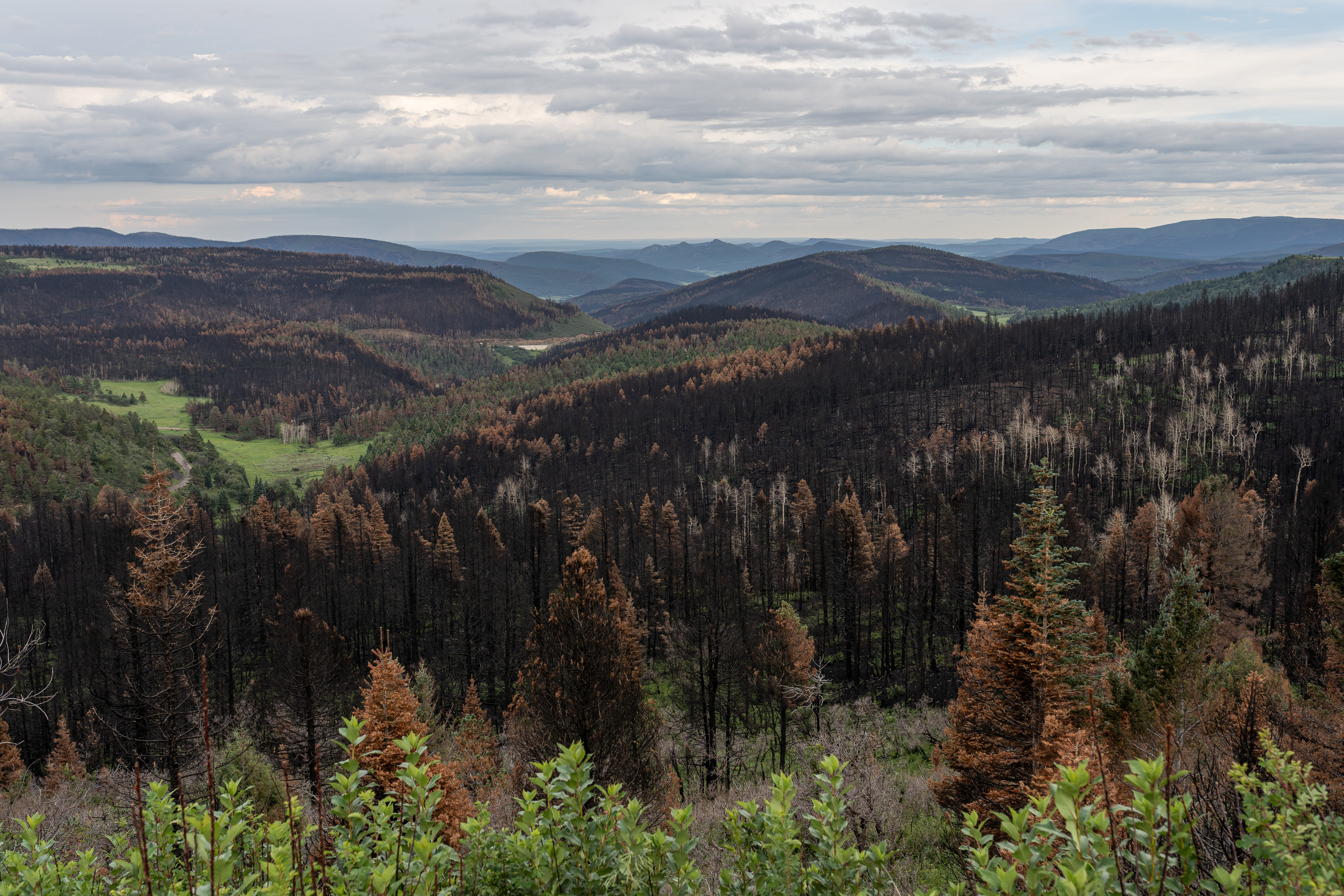
The western part of the grant is in the Sangre de Cristo Mountains.

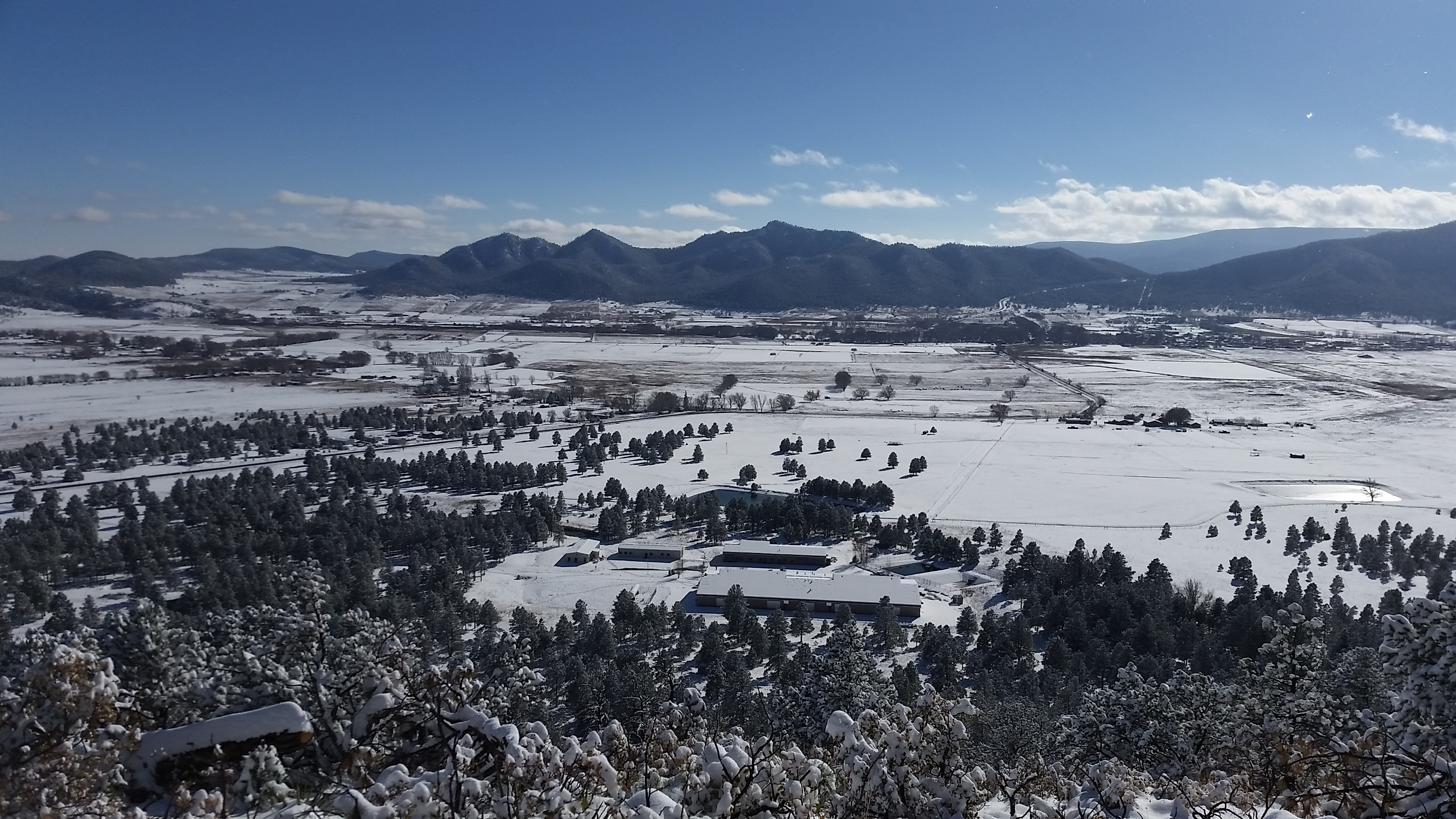
Most of the people in the grant live in the broad Mora Valley. The Mora National Fish Hatchery is in the foreground of the photo. The settlement of Mora is in the distance.

The Mora Land Grant, formally known as La Merced de Santa Gertrudis de lo de Mora, was an 1835 grant of more than 800,000 acres (320,000 ha) to 76 Hispanic settlers by the Mexican government of New Mexico. The land area within the grant was more than 60 miles (97 km) in length from east to west and a maximum of 25 miles (40 km) in width from north to south, reaching from the crest of the Sangre de Cristo Mountains to the Great Plains. The grant was mostly in what became Mora County, New Mexico. The great majority of the land in the grant was designated as common land for the usage of all the residents. After the United States gained control of New Mexico in 1846, land speculators over decades gained control of the common land by legal machinations, thus excluding the residents from use of the land. Disputes about ownership between speculators and residents were frequent and persistent until the former commons land was auctioned in 1916 to the highest bidders.

Cattle ranchers and the National Forest system acquired most of the grant land during the 20th century. Disputes over the allocation of water needed for irrigation continued into the 21st century. Public access to former grant lands in public ownership also remains an issue.

== Description ==
The Mora Land Grant was a 827,621 acres (3,349.26 km^{2}) (1,293 square miles) Mexican land grant mostly in Mora County, New Mexico. The grant land extended from the Great Plains west of the town of Wagon Mound for about 40 miles (64 km) west to the crest of the Sangre de Cristo Mountains with elevations ranging from about 6,500 ft (2,000 m) on the eastern border to 12,835 ft (3,912 m) at Jicarita Peak on the western border. The grant included the upper drainage basin of the Mora River, a tributary of the Canadian River. Most of the agricultural settlements on the grant were along the Mora River and its tributaries in valleys at elevations of 7,100 ft (2,200 m) to 7,600 ft (2,300 m) and ringed by mountains. The largest settlement in the grant area is the community of Mora which had a population of 547 in 2020.

== History ==
Indian warfare kept the colony of New Mexico from expanding for almost two centuries after its creation. After a durable peace was negotiated in 1786 between the Comanche and the colony of New Mexico, Indian raids decreased and Hispanic settlers from west of the Rocky Mountains began to migrate to east of the Rockies, including Mora, to establish ranching and farming settlements. The Comanche peace broke down in 1821 when Mexico became independent of Spain. The early settlers on the Mora grant were from Trampas, Embudo, and Picuris. In 1818, 76 settlers in what was called Lo de Mora requested the establishment of a Catholic church in the valley. In 1835, the Mayor of Trampas, Manuel Antonio Sanchez, journeyed to the Mora Valley to establish the government there, organize settlements, and legalize the informal land tenure system by distributing land to settlers. He established (or recognized) the town of Santa Gertrudis (present day Mora) and distributed land to forty settlers. He also founded the settlement of San Antonio (present day Cleveland) in the upper valley of the Mora River and distributed land there to 29 settlers. Long, narrow strips of land bordering on the Mora River were given to each farmer so that each had access to irrigation water. That pattern of land ownership is still seen in the Mora Valley. As usual in New Mexican land grants, most of the grant land not suitable for irrigation was designated as common land for grazing and timber cutting.

Governor Albino Perez created the Mora Land Grant on September 28, 1835. Its boundaries contained 827,621 acres (334,926 ha) of land. The Mora Grant was one of several large land grants created by the government of New Mexico to establish a buffer zone and fend off the encroaching Anglo-Americans.

The United States invaded New Mexico in 1846 and in 1848 the Treaty of Guadalupe Hidalgo codified U.S. control of the territory conquered from Mexico. The treaty promised that that United States would respect the property rights of the people in New Mexico. A U.S. military post, Fort Union, was established on grant land in 1851 to protect commerce on the Santa Fe Trail from Indian raids. In 1854 the U.S. Congress created the office of the Surveyor General of New Mexico to determine the legality of the many land grants in New Mexico. In 1876 the U.S. affirmed the rights to the land of the original 76 grantees and their ancestors on the Mora grant lands (a decision that had implications as discussed below).

The economy of the inhabitants of the Mora Grant was concentrated on semi-subsistence agriculture, grazing large herds of cattle and sheep, timber, and migratory labor. The Santa Fe Trail passed through the eastern part of the grant, but a railroad supplanted it after its completion in 1879. The wool industry became important with a market for the trade in Wagon Mound, just outside the eastern boundary of the Mora Grant. Wheat was the most important crop. Seven flour mills dotted the Mora Valley with Fort Union a major customer until its closure in 1891.

== Land disputes ==
Land speculators, attorneys, and politicians in American-controlled New Mexico, called the Santa Fe Ring, realized "that a fortune lay in the legal process of quieting [obtaining] title to the disputed Spanish and Mexican land grants." The land of the large Mora grant was among the targets of the members of the Santa Fe Ring.

In 1875 and 1876, New Mexican politician Stephen B. Elkins used his influence to have the common lands of the Mora Grant designated by the U.S. government as the property of the original 76 settlers and their descendants rather than as the common property of the community of several thousand residents on grant land. Each of those 76 settlers thus became owners of 10,890 acres (4,410 ha) of the common lands in the grant. However, in the years previous to that designation, Elkins and his partner and brother-in-law attorney Thomas B. Catron had bought land rights from many of the original settlers who believed that the common lands were community property rather than individual property and that their rights to the land were of little monetary value. Elkins and Catron paid as little as twenty dollars to individuals for their land rights.

Elkins, Catron, and allies had claims to 600,000 acres (240,000 ha) of land in the Mora grant but ran into legal difficulty with the residents who refused to pay rent or otherwise acknowledge their ownership. The legal machinations continued for decades. Elkins and Catron were never able to establish their ownership, nor realize any profit from their claims to the land. In 1916, a partition suit resulted in the sale of the Mora Land Grant commons and the residents, most of whom were unaware of the sale, lost their rights and access to the former common lands. Most of the land was eventually acquired by large cattle ranchers. In 1931, 41,397 acres (16,753 ha) in the former grant area was deeded by an owner to the U.S. Forest Service in exchange for rights to harvest timber in the state of Washington.

=== Public access to grant lands ===
Common with other land grants, access to former grant lands by descendants of grantees and the general public remains an issue. For example, in 2018, the Attorney General of New Mexico confirmed the right to access more than 50,000 acres (20,000 ha) of public lands in Mora County via long-existing roads. A wealthy landowner had blocked the roads running through his property and prevented public access.

== Water disputes and acequias ==
The population of the Mora grant grew rapidly and by 1870 numbered 8,000 (compared to less than 4,000 in 2020). Water to irrigate crops was scarce. Settlers on the Mora grant constructed gravity-fed irrigation ditches (acequias) to divert water from three headwaters sources of the Rio Pueblo on the western side of the Sangre de Cristo mountains to the Mora River on the eastern side. (The Rio Pueblo is an upstream tributary of Embudo Creek and not the same as the Rio Pueblo de Taos.) The first diversion of water from Alamitos Creek was built about 1820; the second diversion from the Rito de la Presa was built in 1864; and the third and largest diversion was from the Rito Angostura. This diversion via acequias took 20 families three years to construct from 1879 to 1882. The acequia is 8 mi (13 km) long and "constructed without the benefit of sophisticated tools and engineering know-how, accomplishing the seemingly impossible task" of bringing water from one side of the mountains to the other. In drought years as much as one-half of the water feeding into the Rio Pueblo is diverted to Mora County. In 2021, that water irrigated about 1,900 acres (770 ha) of agricultural land owned by 143 users.

The transfer of water is controversial. The Picuris Pueblo contested the diversion of water from their territory to the Mora grant as early as the 1860s and pursued a lawsuit against the diversion of water in the 1880s. The suit was dismissed as no attorney would take the case. Disputes about water continued into the 21st century. In 2021, unidentified persons blocked the acequia directing water from Alamitos Creek with a mound of rocks and interrupted the flow of water to Mora Country. The blockage was quickly removed, but the dispute over water rights continued.
