= Cassidy Mill =

- U.S. National Register of Historic Places
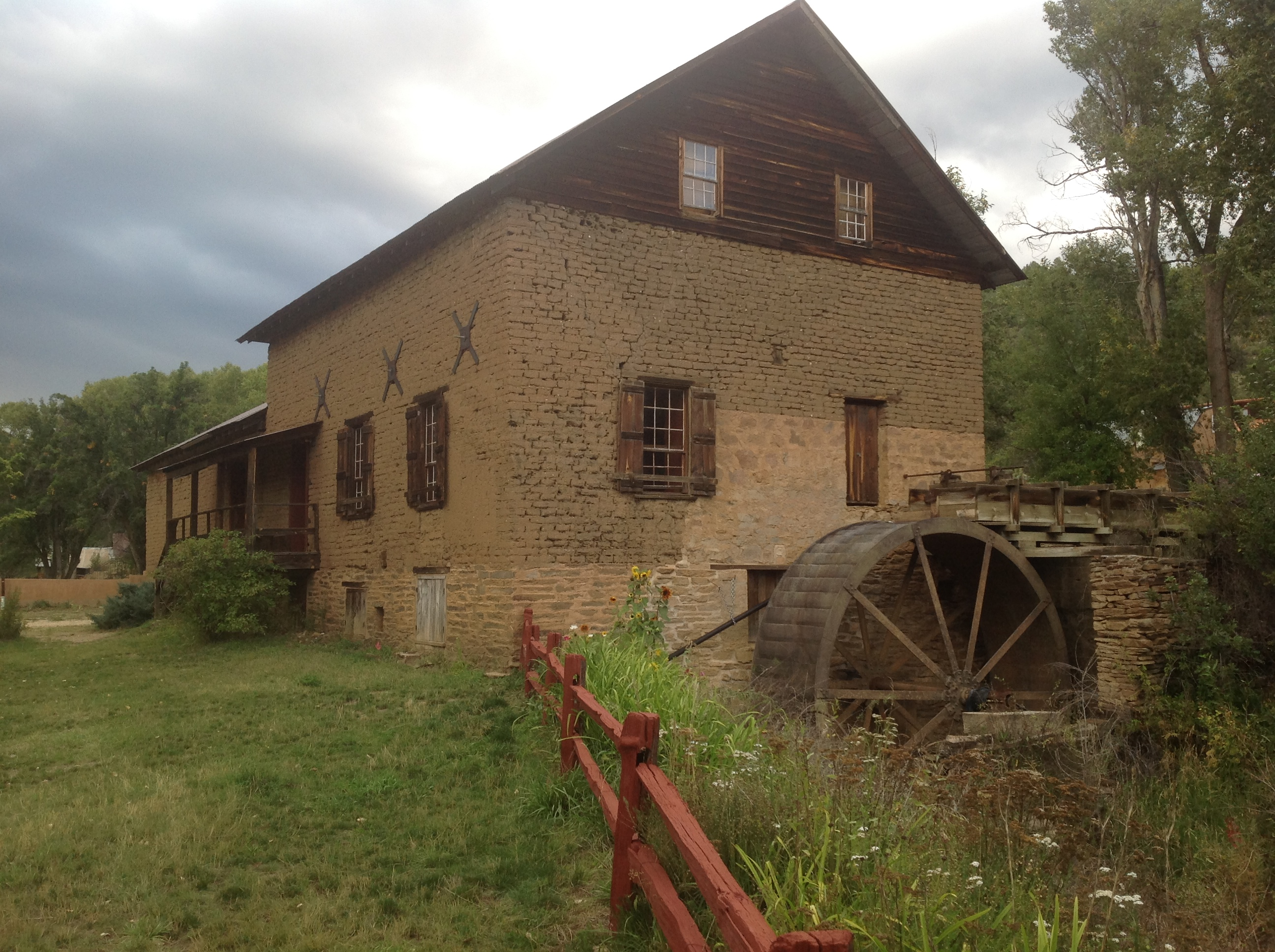

- Location within New Mexico Location within the United States
- Nearest city: Cleveland, New Mexico
- Coordinates: 35°59′08″N 105°21′29″W
- Area: less than one acre
- Built: 1877
- Built by: Joseph Fuss
- NRHP reference No.: 78001818
- Added to NRHP: December 6, 1978

Cassidy Mill, in Mora County, New Mexico, near Cleveland, was built in 1877. It is located southeast of Cleveland on New Mexico State Road 3 and was listed on the National Register of Historic Places in 1978.

It is a three-story adobe building built upon basement walls and stone foundations. It was equipped with a set of French buhrstones, and was built by Joseph Fuss. It was documented by the Historic American Engineering Record (HAER) in May, 1978.

== See also ==
- St. Vrain's Mill, at Mora, also NRHP-listed
