= St. Vrain's Mill =

- U.S. National Register of Historic Places
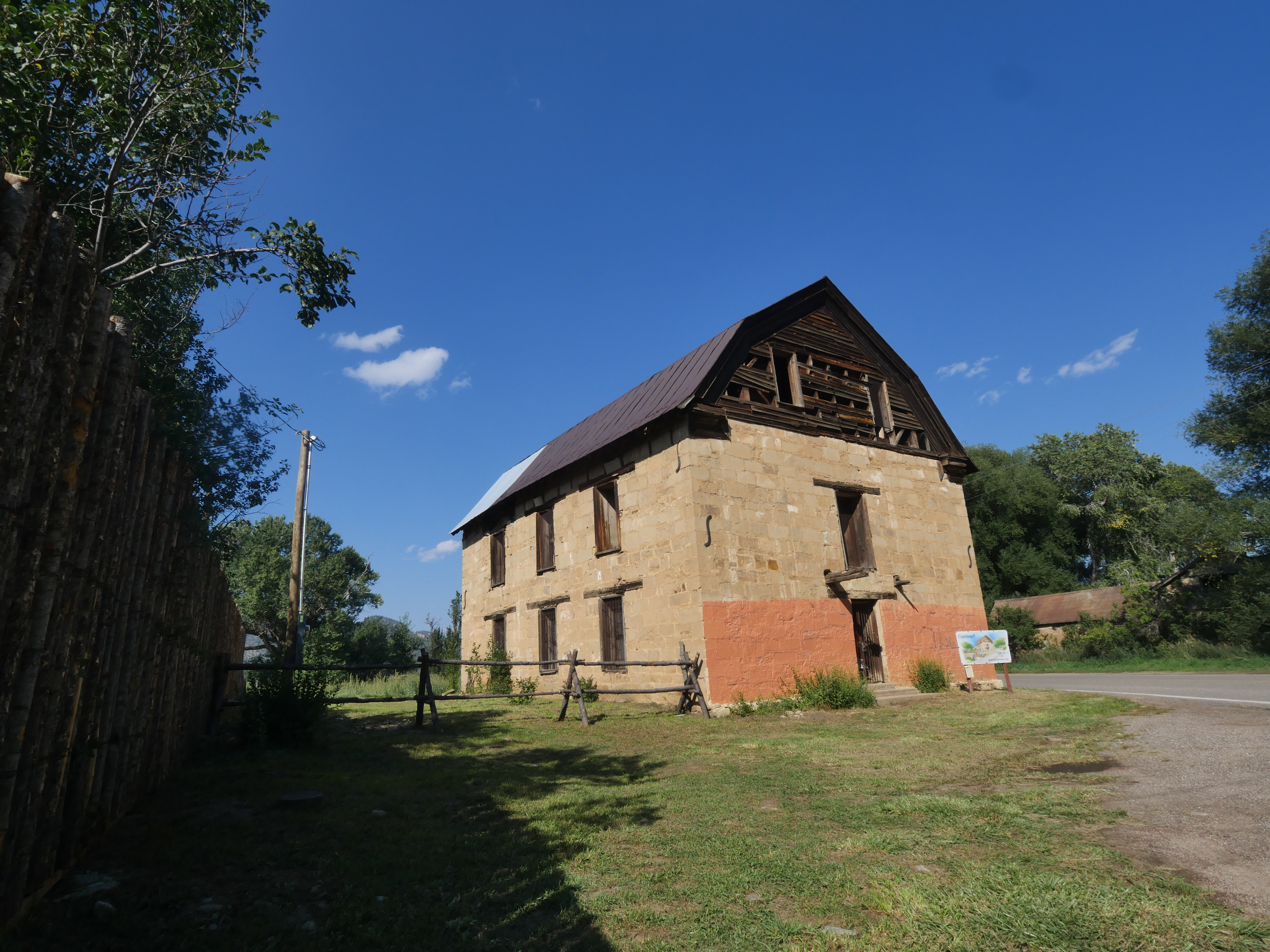
- Location: On NM 38, Mora, New Mexico
- Coordinates: 35.97573°N 105.32916°W
- Area: less than one acre
- Built: c.1864
- NRHP reference No.: 73001143
- Added to NRHP: August 28, 1973

The St. Vrain's Mill of Mora, New Mexico is a three-story, stone-constructed gristmill built around 1864 by Ceran St. Vrain. It has also been known as El Molino de Piedra. The building was added to the National Register of Historic Places in 1973.

== See also ==
- Cassidy Mill, also NRHP-listed
