= Canoncito, Mora County, New Mexico =

Canoncito, New Mexico
- Unincorporated community
- Location within New Mexico Location within the United States
- Coordinates: 35°56′57″N 105°15′45″W
- Country: United States
- State: New Mexico
- County: Mora
- Elevation: 7,064 ft (2,153 m)
- Time zone: UTC-7 (Mountain (MST))
  - Summer (DST): UTC-6 (MDT)
- Area code: 575
- GNIS feature ID: 899329

Canoncito is an unincorporated community in Mora County, New Mexico, United States. Canoncito is located along New Mexico State Road 518, 25 miles (40 km) north of Las Vegas. It was named due to being located in a small canyon.
