= Daniel Cassidy and Sons General Merchandise Store =

- Cassidy, Daniel, and Sons General Merchandise Store
- U.S. National Register of Historic Places
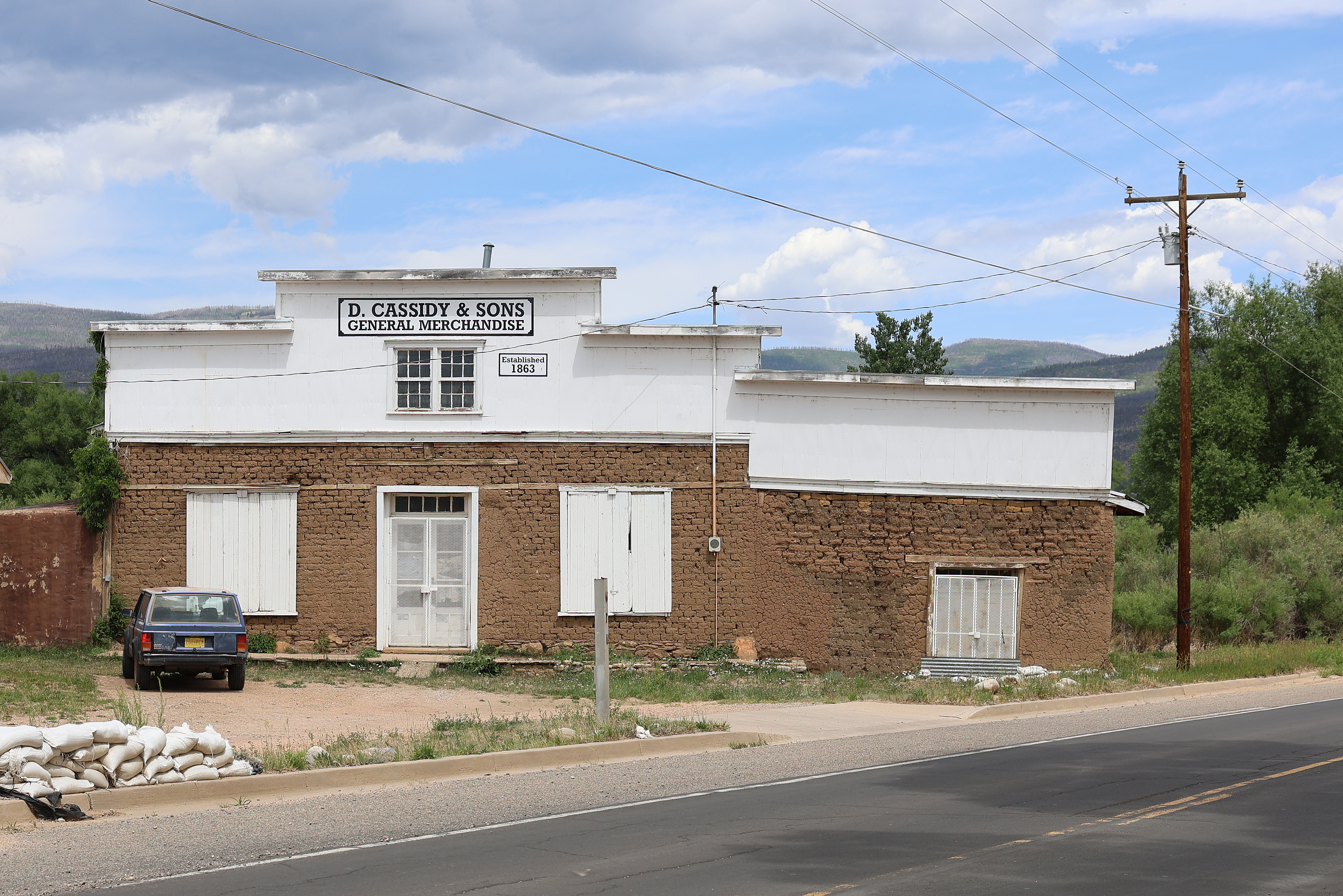
- The store in 2026

- Location within New Mexico
- Location: NM 518, Cleveland, New Mexico
- Coordinates: 35°59′41″N 105°22′16″W
- Area: 1.1 acres (0.45 ha)
- Built: c.1863
- Architectural style: Victorian
- NRHP reference No.: 79001541
- Added to NRHP: August 1, 1979

The Daniel Cassidy and Sons General Merchandise Store, on the west side of New Mexico State Road 518 in Cleveland, New Mexico, dates from around 1865. It was listed on the National Register of Historic Places in 1979. The listing included two contributing buildings.

It is a cluster of adobe buildings including a 50 by 50 feet (15 m × 15 m) store and a large family dwelling, plus an L-shaped barn, other outbuildings, plus wagon yards and stock corrals The business started in c.1863.
