= Santa Clara Hotel =

- U.S. National Register of Historic Places
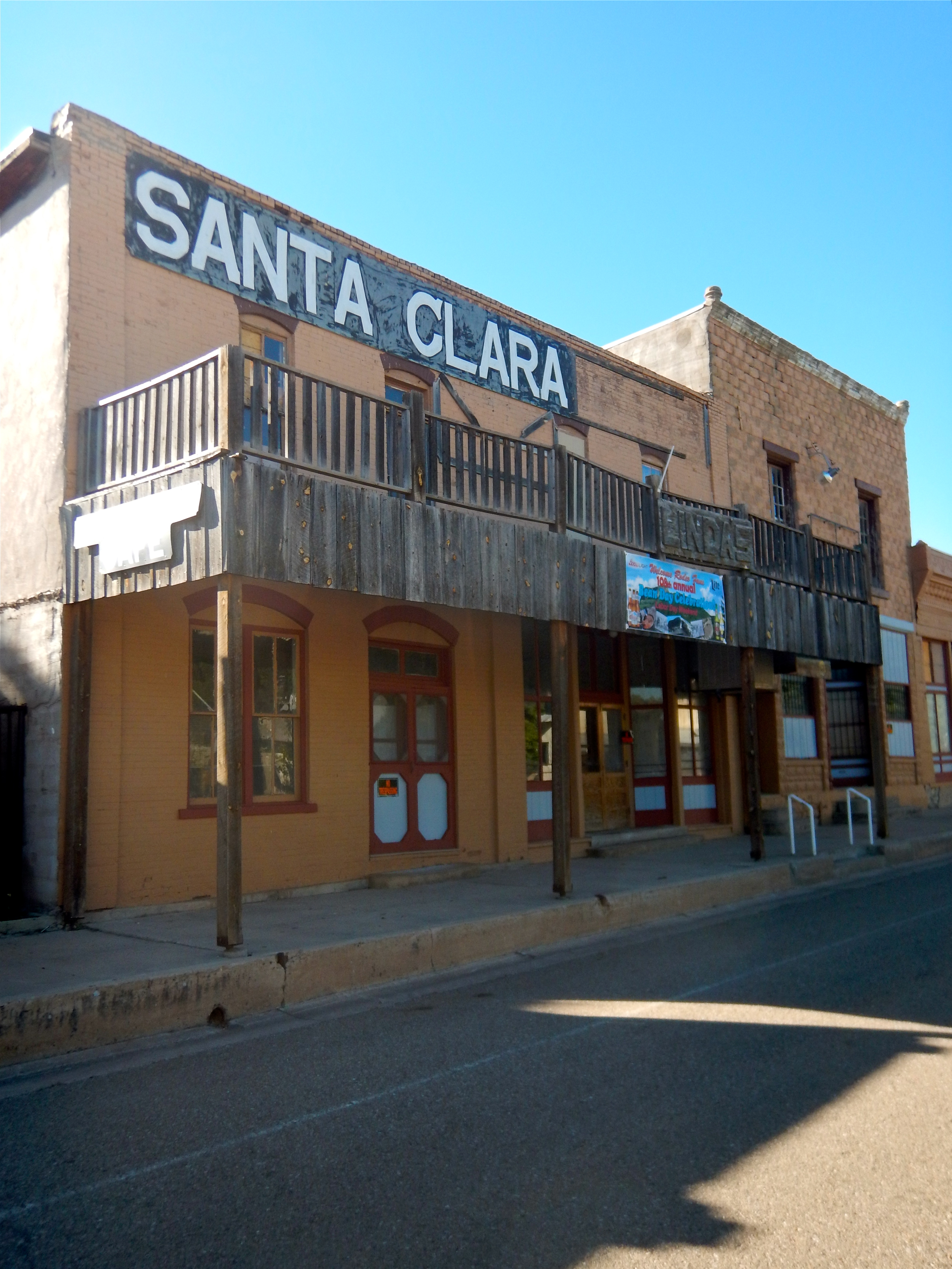

- Location within New Mexico
- Location: 111 Railroad Ave., Wagon Mound, New Mexico
- Coordinates: 36°00′30″N 104°42′22″W
- Area: less than one acre
- Built: c.1900 and c.1910
- Architectural style: Late Victorian, Vernacular Railroad Commerci
- NRHP reference No.: 91000602
- Added to NRHP: May 16, 1991

The Santa Clara Hotel, at 111 Railroad Ave. in Wagon Mound, New Mexico, was built around 1900 and 1910. It was listed on the National Register of Historic Places in 1991. The listing included two contributing buildings.

It was deemed significant as "one of only a few buildings from the railroad era remaining on Railroad Avenue, the main commercial street of Wagon Mound. Located half a block from the depot, the hotel is historically significant for its associations with the railroad era from which the village of Wagon Mound originated. Architecturally it represents a vernacular expression of the commercial architecture which followed the railroad into New Mexico."

It has also been known as Chamblis Hotel and as City Hotel.
