= Fort Union National Monument =

National monument in the United States

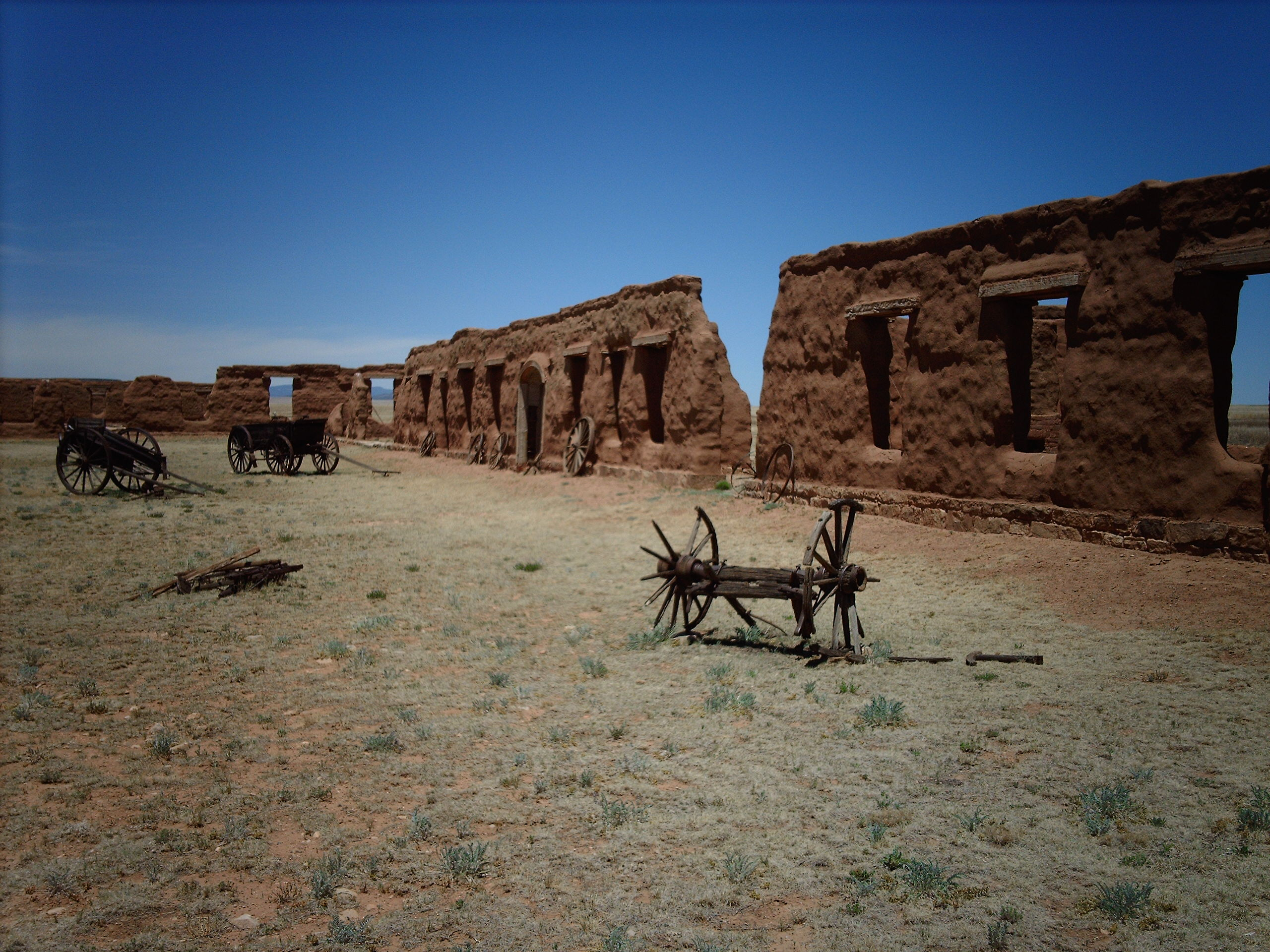
- Fort Union Ruins

- Location within New Mexico Location within the United States
- Interactive map of Fort Union National Monument
- Location: Mora County, New Mexico, U.S.
- Nearest city: Watrous, New Mexico
- Coordinates: 35.907°N 105.015°W
- Area: 720.6 acres (291.6 ha)
- Established: June 28, 1954
- Visitors: 9,570 (in 2023)
- Governing body: National Park Service
- Website: Fort Union National Monument
- Fort Union National Monument
- U.S. National Register of Historic Places
- NM State Register of Cultural Properties
- Built: 1851
- NRHP reference No.: 66000044
- NMSRCP No.: 61

Significant dates
- Added to NRHP: October 15, 1966
- Designated NMSRCP: May 23, 1969

Fort Union National Monument is a unit of the United States National Park Service located 7.7 miles north of Watrous in Mora County, New Mexico.

The site preserves the remains of three forts that were built starting in the 1850s. Also visible at Fort Union and from the road leading to it are ruts from the Mountain and Cimarron Branches of the old Santa Fe Trail.

The monument has a visitor center containing a historical museum and showing a film about the fort's history. A self-guiding trail leads through remains of the second and third forts. Ruins of the ordnance depot and site of the first fort are visible across the valley to the west.

The monument is open 8:00 am to 4:00 pm throughout the year except Thanksgiving (fourth Thursday of November), Christmas Day (December 25), and New Year's Day (January 1). Admission is free.

== Description by William Davis ==
Santa Fe trader and author William Davis gave his first impression of the fort in 1857:

Fort Union, a hundred and ten miles from Santa Fé, is situated in the pleasant valley of the Moro. It is an open post, without either stockades or breastworks of any kind, and, barring the officers and soldiers who are seen about, it has much more the appearance of a quiet frontier village than that of a military station. It is laid out with broad and straight streets crossing each other at right angles. The huts are built of pine logs, obtained from the neighboring mountains, and the quarters of both officers and men wore a neat and comfortable appearance.

== History of Fort Union ==
The Treaty of Guadalupe Hidalgo, which ended the Mexican-American War in February 1848, gave the U.S. undisputed control of Texas and ceded to the United States the present-day states of California, Nevada, Utah, most of New Mexico, Arizona, and Colorado, and parts of Texas, Oklahoma, Kansas, and Wyoming.

In New Mexico, the U.S. army set up garrisons in settlements to protect the area's inhabitants and travel routes from raids by Native Americans, but this proved unsatisfactory. Temptations in civilian communities such as alcohol distracted soldiers and often made them unfit for duty.

In April 1851, Lt. Col. Edwin V. Sumner was ordered to revise the defense of the territory. Among his first acts was to break up the garrisons and move them closer to the Indians. He moved his headquarters and supply depot from Santa Fe to near where the Mountain and Cimarron branches of the Santa Fe Trail converged. This was about 25 miles northeast of the town of Las Vegas. There he set up Fort Union.

The first of the three forts built in this valley was begun in August 1851. For a decade it served as the base for military operations in the area and a key station on the Santa Fe Trail, affording travelers a place to rest nearby and refit at the post sutler's store (where general merchandise not supplied to soldiers by the army was sold). It also became the principal military supply depot of the Southwest.

During the 1850s, the fort's mounted riflemen (called dragoons) campaigned against several southern Rocky Mountain Indian tribes that were disrupting traffic on the Santa Fe Trail. One of the first campaigns was directed against the Jicarilla Apaches. In 1854, that tribe nearly wiped out a company of dragoons. The Apaches were driven into the mountains west of the Rio Grande and routed. Military operations were also conducted against Utes of southern Colorado in 1855 and Kiowas and Comanches for raiding the plains east of the fort in 1860–61.

Anticipating a Confederate invasion of New Mexico, Col. Edward R.S. Canby, charged with the territory's defense, concentrated troops at Fort Craig on the Rio Grande near present-day Socorro, and sent its soldiers to patrol the Santa Fe Trail, the main artery of supply for federal forces. He also ordered construction of the second Fort Union, a star-shaped earthen fortification, to strengthen defenses.

When the Civil War began in April 1861, most of the regular troops (except those officers who joined Confederate forces) were withdrawn from Fort Union and other frontier posts to be sent east. They were replaced by volunteer regiments.

The second fort at the national monument was designed to defend against a Confederate military invasion coming north up the Rio Grande Valley, from El Paso, Texas. Early in the war, such a force was turned back in 1862 by Colorado and New Mexico volunteers and U.S. regulars from Fort Union. They fought the Confederates at Glorieta Pass, about 20 miles southeast of Santa Fe. Defeated, the Confederates withdrew to Texas, ending Civil War activity in the Southwest and saving the mines in Colorado from being used as a source of funds for the South. The second Fort Union was abandoned soon afterwards.

Construction of the third fort began in 1863. With New Mexico securely in federal hands, the new departmental commander, Brig. Gen. James H. Carleton began its construction. The sprawling installation took six years to complete and was the most extensive in the territory. It included not only a military post, but also a separate quartermaster depot with warehouses, corrals, shops, offices, and living quarters.

The supply function of the fort overshadowed that of the military and employed far more men, most of which were civilians. An ordnance depot, erected on the site of the first fort at the western edge of the valley, rounded out the complex.

Throughout the 1860s and the '70s, troops from Fort Union took part in operations against the Native Americans. Several relentless campaigns against the Apaches, Navajos, Cheyennes, Arapahos, Kiowas, Utes, and Comanches finally brought peace to the Southern Plains in the spring of 1875 on the government's terms.

Fort Union's involvement in the Indian wars had come to an end, but its garrison occasionally helped to track down outlaws, quell mob violence, and mediate feuds. The supply depot continued to flourish until 1879, when the Santa Fe Railroad replaced the Santa Fe Trail as the principal means of commerce. By 1891, the fort had outlived its usefulness and was abandoned.

== Units assigned to Fort Union and Kit Carson ==
The fort served as headquarters of the 8th Cavalry in the early 1870s and as headquarters of the 9th Cavalry in the late 1870s during the Apache Wars. Christopher “Kit” Carson was commander of Fort Union from December 24, 1865, to April 24, 1866.

== Land ownership ==
In its 40 years (1851–1891) as a frontier post, Fort Union had to defend itself in the courtroom, as well as on the battlefield. When the United States Army built Fort Union in the Mora Valley in 1851, the soldiers were unaware that they had encroached on private property, which was part of the Mora Land Grant. The following year, Colonel Edwin Vose Sumner expanded the fort to an area of eight square miles by claiming the site as a military reservation. In 1868, President Andrew Johnson declared a timber reservation, encompassing the entire range of the Turkey Mountains (part of the Sangre de Cristo range) and comprising an area of 53 sq mi, as part of the fort.

The claimants of the Mora Grant immediately challenged the government squatters and took the case to court. By the mid-1850s, the case reached Congress. In the next two decades, the government did not give any favorable decision to the claimants, until 1876, when the surveyor-general of New Mexico reported that Fort Union was "no doubt" located in the Mora Grant, but the army was unwilling to move to another place or to compensate the claimants because of the cost. The secretary of war took "a prudential measure", protesting the decision of the acting commissioner of the General Land Office. He argued that the military had improved the area and should not give it up without compensation. This stalling tactic worked; the army stayed at the fort until its demise in 1891, not paying a single penny to legitimate owners.

== Gallery ==
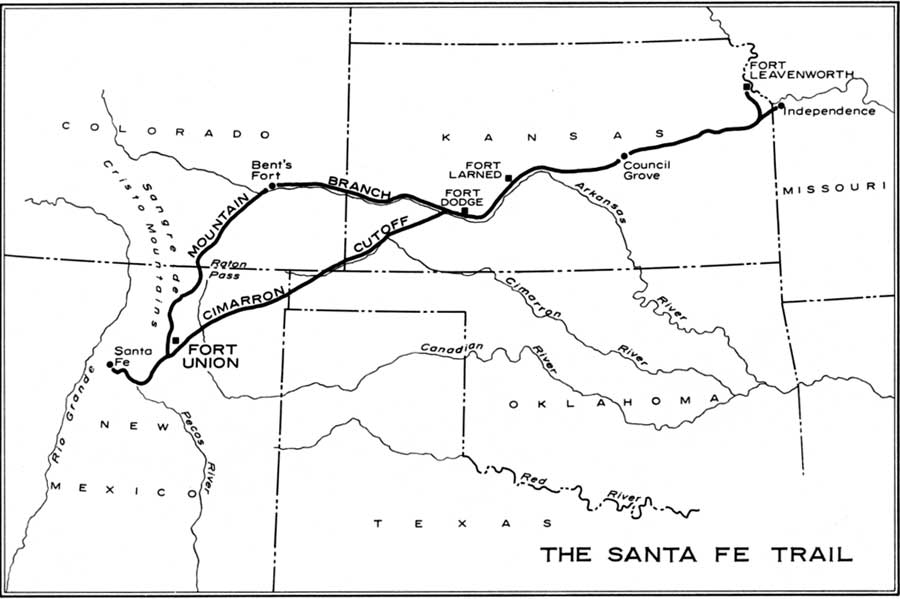
Map of the historic Santa Fe Trail

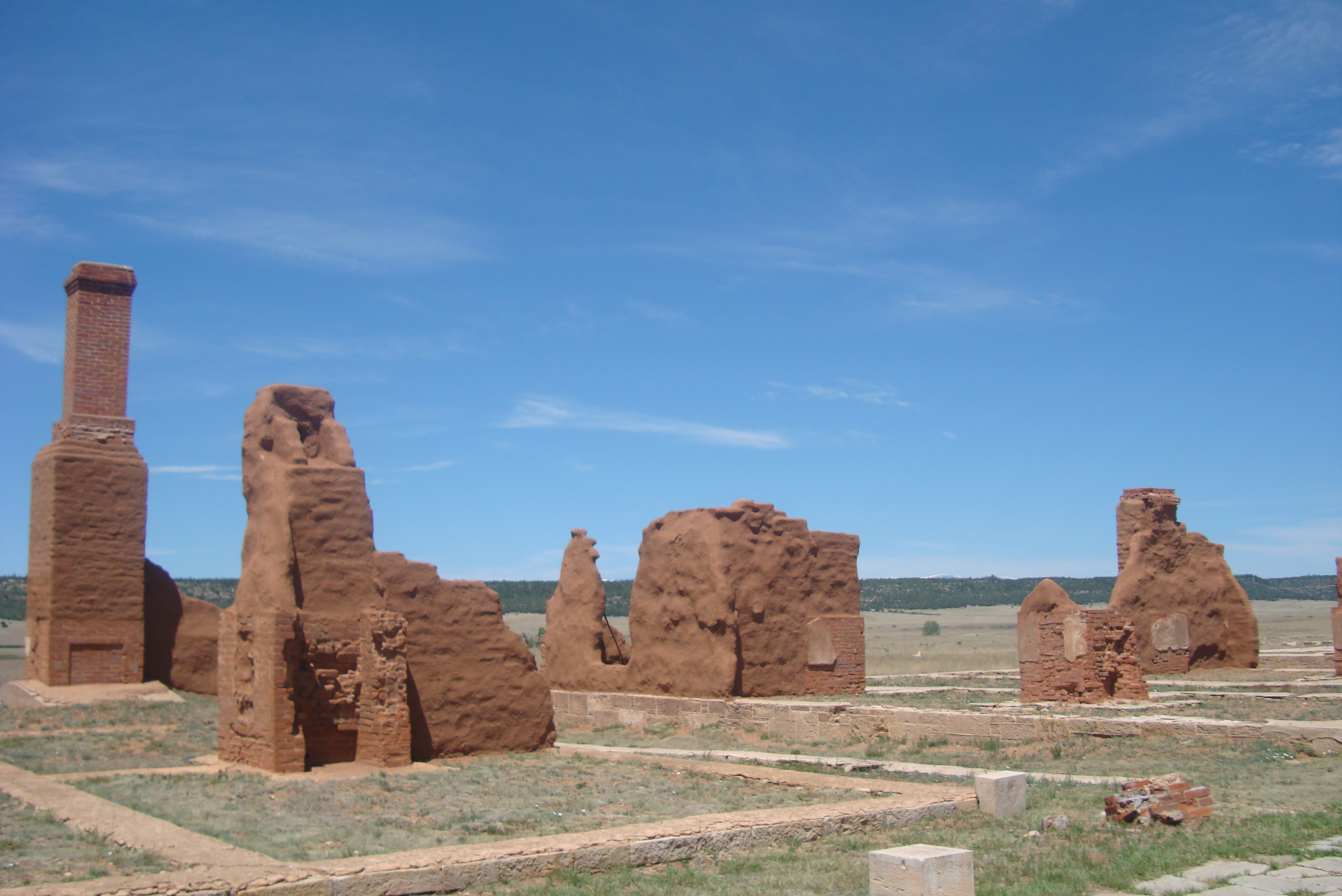
Remainder of buildings along Officer's Row

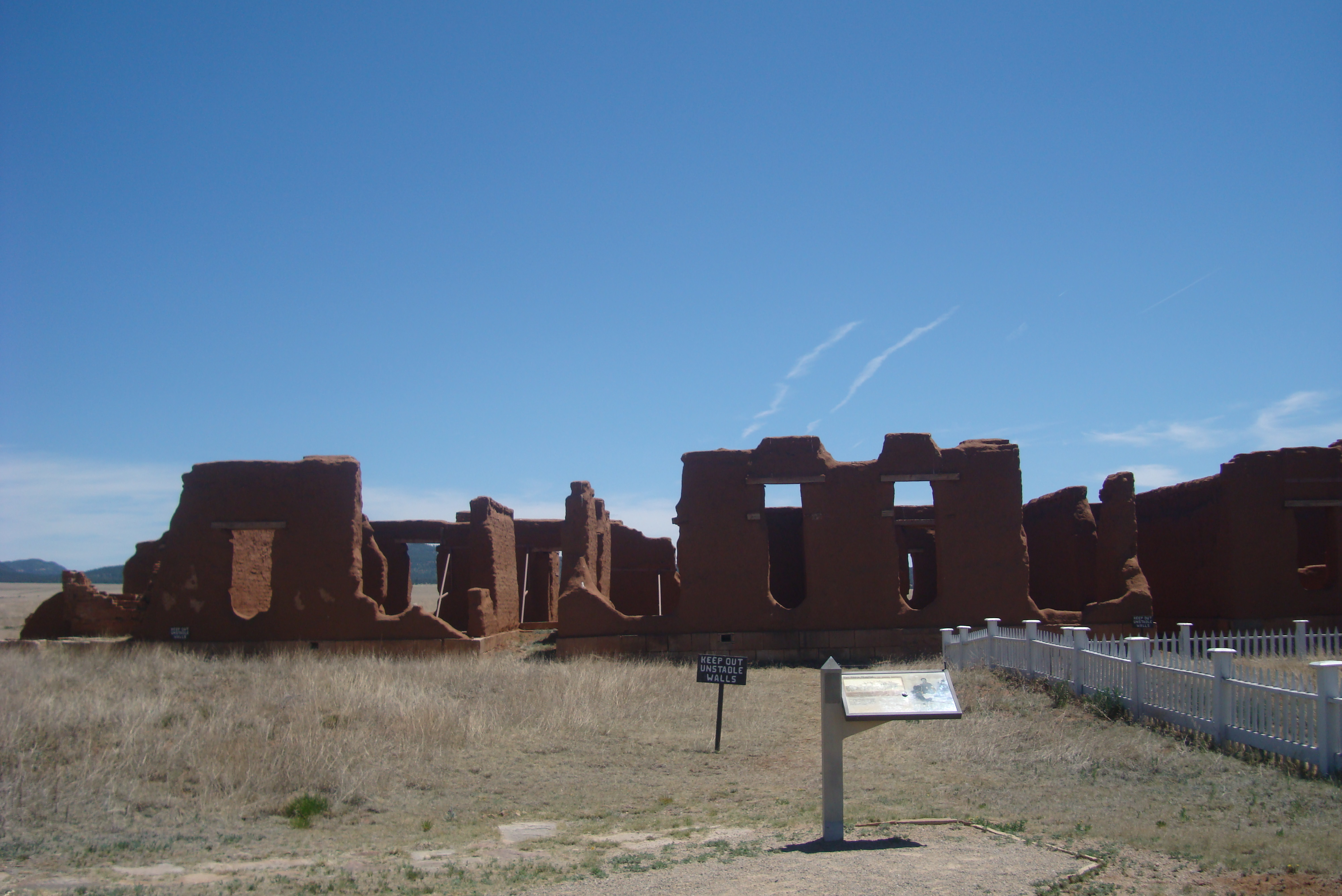
Remainder of the fort's hospital

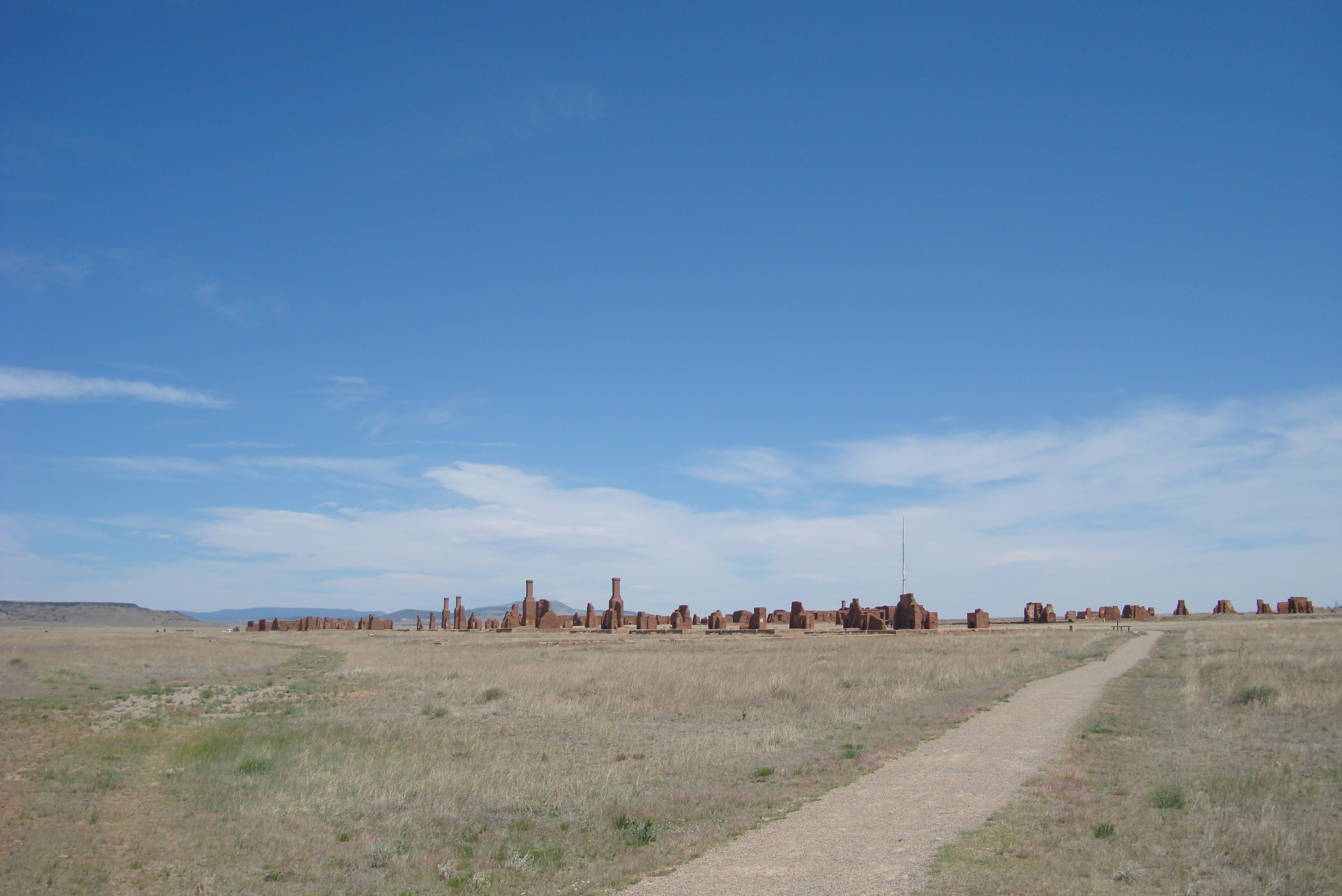
View of the fort from a distance away

== See also ==
- National Register of Historic Places listings in Mora County, New Mexico
- List of national monuments of the United States
- Geology of Fort Union and the nearby area by New Mexico Institute of Mining and Technology
