= Holman, New Mexico =

- Unincorporated community
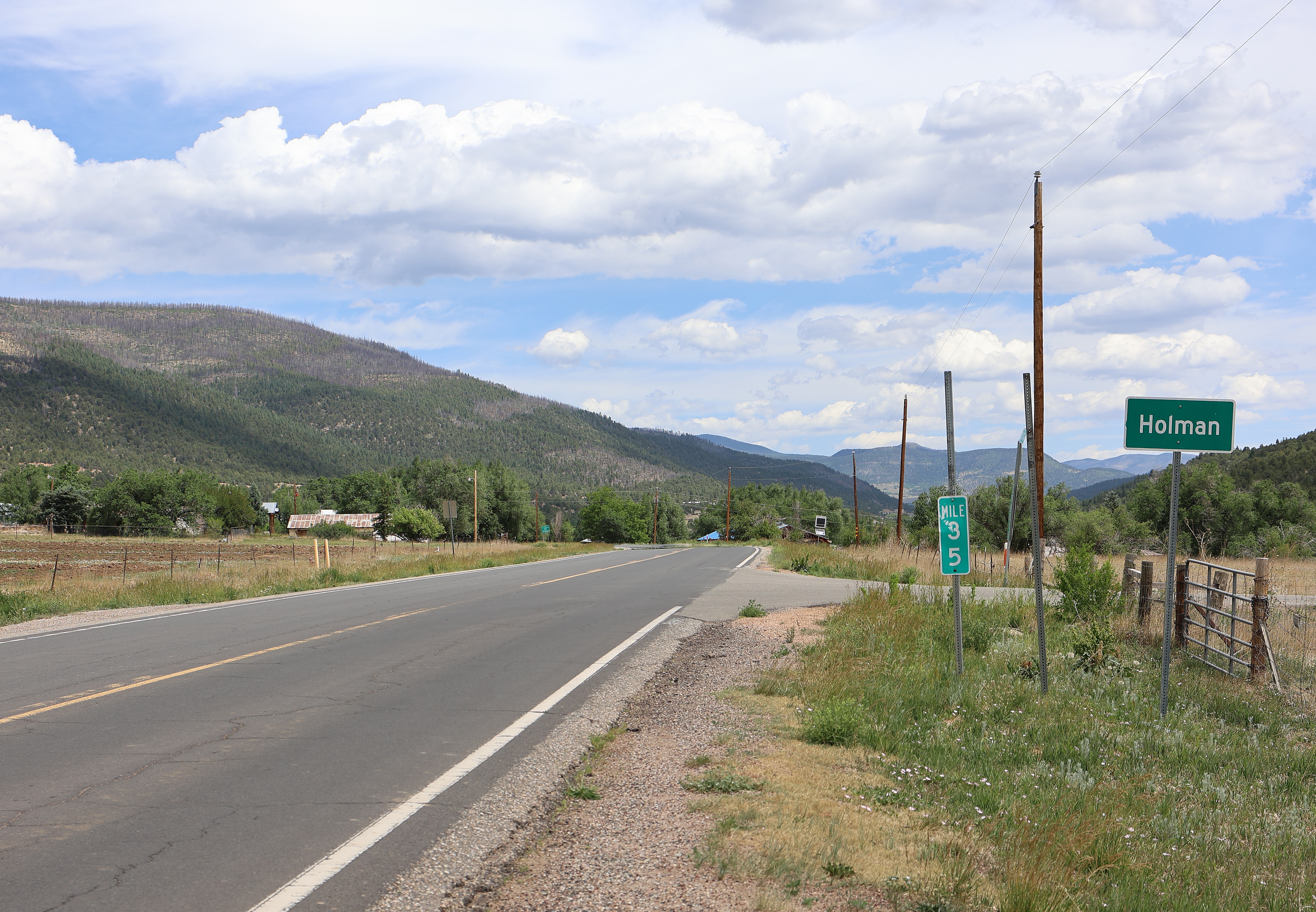
- Looking north along State Road 518 in Holman (2026)

- Location within New Mexico Location within the United States
- Coordinates: 36°02′18″N 105°23′01″W
- Country: United States
- State: New Mexico
- County: Mora
- Elevation: 7,562 ft (2,305 m)
- Time zone: UTC-7 (Mountain (MST))
  - Summer (DST): UTC-6 (MDT)
- ZIP codes: 87723
- Area code: 505
- GNIS feature ID: 915838

Holman is an unincorporated community located in Mora County, New Mexico, United States. The community is located on New Mexico State Road 518, 5.3 miles (8.5 km) northwest of Mora. Holman has a post office with ZIP code 87723, which opened on September 17, 1894. Holman was settled in 1816.
