= Cleveland, New Mexico =

- Unincorporated community
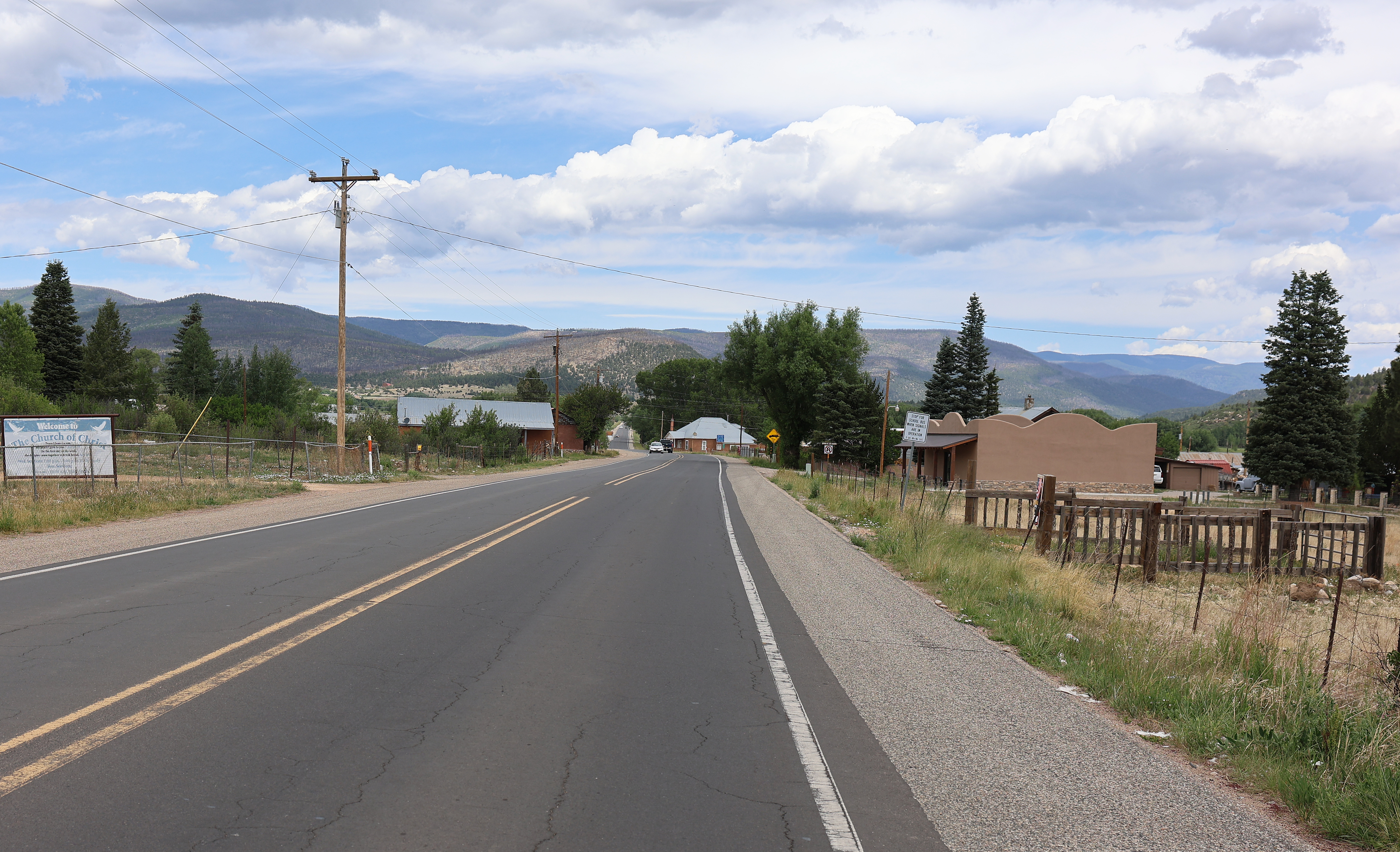
- Looking north along State Road 518 in Cleveland (2026)

- Location within New Mexico Location within the United States
- Coordinates: 35°59′36″N 105°22′14″W
- Country: United States
- State: New Mexico
- County: Mora
- Elevation: 7,375 ft (2,248 m)
- Time zone: UTC-7 (Mountain (MST))
  - Summer (DST): UTC-6 (MDT)
- ZIP codes: 87715
- Area code: 505
- GNIS feature ID: 915813

Cleveland is an unincorporated community located in Mora County, New Mexico, United States. The community is located on New Mexico State Road 518, 2.6 miles (4.2 km) west-northwest of Mora. Cleveland has a post office with ZIP code 87715, which opened on August 11, 1892. The town was named after President Grover Cleveland.
