= Watrous, New Mexico =

- Census-designated place
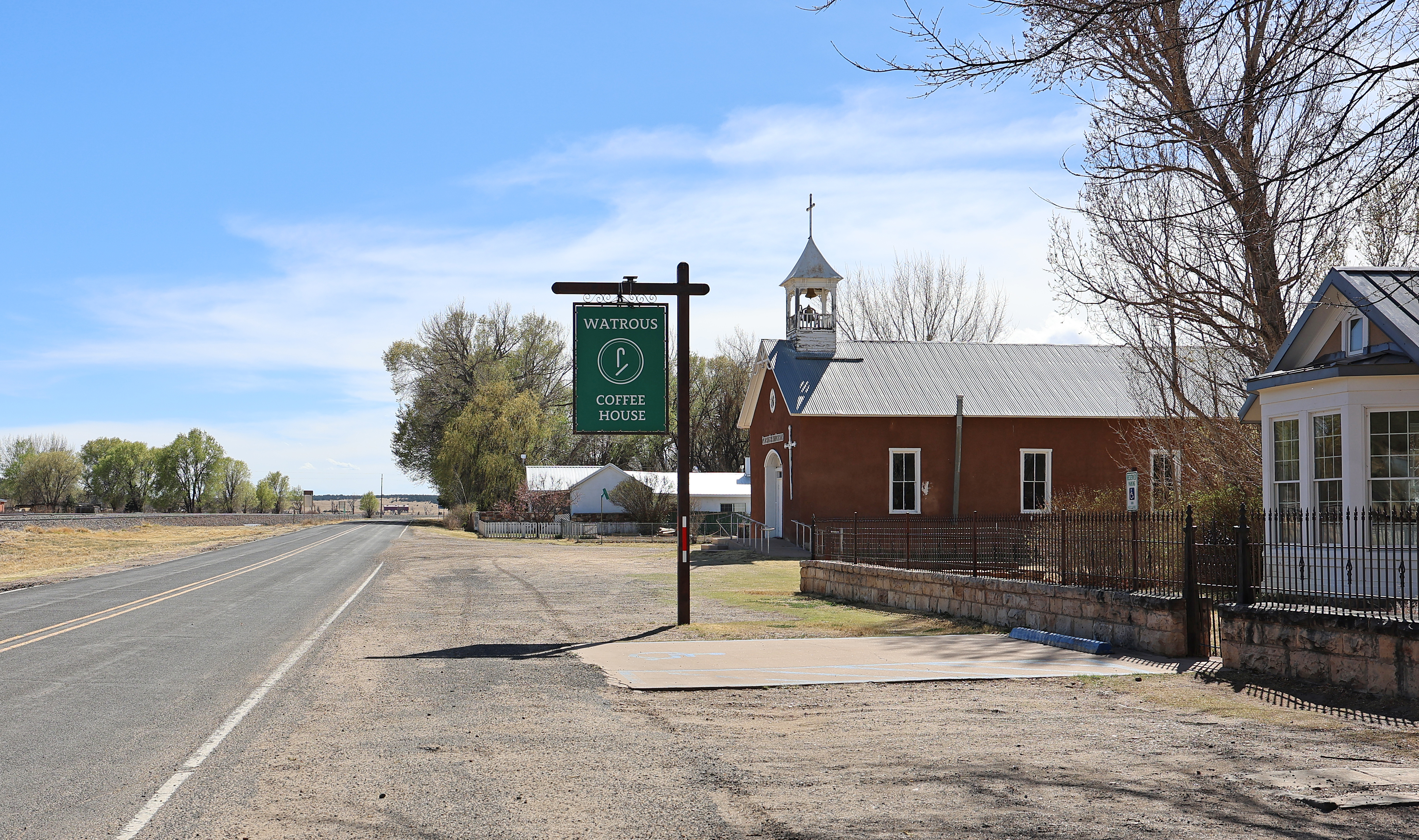
- State Road 161 in Watrous (2026)

- Location within New Mexico Location within the United States
- Coordinates: 35°47′26″N 104°58′54″W
- Country: United States
- State: New Mexico
- County: Mora

Area
  - Total: 0.57 sq mi (1.48 km^{2})
  - Land: 0.57 sq mi (1.47 km^{2})
  - Water: 0.0039 sq mi (0.01 km^{2})
- Elevation: 6,421 ft (1,957 m)

Population (2020)
  - Total: 99
  - Density: 173.9/sq mi (67.14/km^{2})
- Time zone: UTC-7 (Mountain (MST))
  - Summer (DST): UTC-6 (MDT)
- ZIP code: 87753
- Area code: 575
- GNIS feature ID: 896280
- FIPS code: 35-83830

Watrous is an unincorporated community and census-designated place (CDP) in Mora County, New Mexico, United States. Its population was 99 as of the 2020 census, down from 135 in 2010. Watrous has a post office with ZIP code 87753, which opened on April 14, 1868. The community is located along Interstate 25. It was named after merchant and landowner Samuel Watrous, who moved to New Mexico from Vermont in 1835.

== Geography ==
Watrous is in southern Mora County, 1 mile (1.6 km) north of the San Miguel County line. Interstate 25 runs along the west side of the community. New Mexico State Road 161 runs through the center of town, connecting with I-25 at Exit 364 to the south and Exit 366 to the north. I-25 leads southwest 20 miles (32 km) to Las Vegas, New Mexico, and northeast 48 miles (77 km) to Springer.

According to the U.S. Census Bureau, the Watrous CDP has an area of 0.57 square miles (1.48 km^{2}), of which 0.004 square miles (0.010 km^{2}), or 0.70%, are water. The Mora River runs along the northern edge of the community, flowing east toward the Canadian River in San Miguel County. The Sapello River, a tributary of the Mora, flows through the west side of town.

== Demographics ==
Historical population
Census	Pop.	Note	%±
2010	135		—
2020	99		−26.7%
U.S. Decennial Census

== Education ==
It is in the Las Vegas City Schools. Its high school is Robertson High School.
