= Mora County, New Mexico =

County in New Mexico, United States

- County
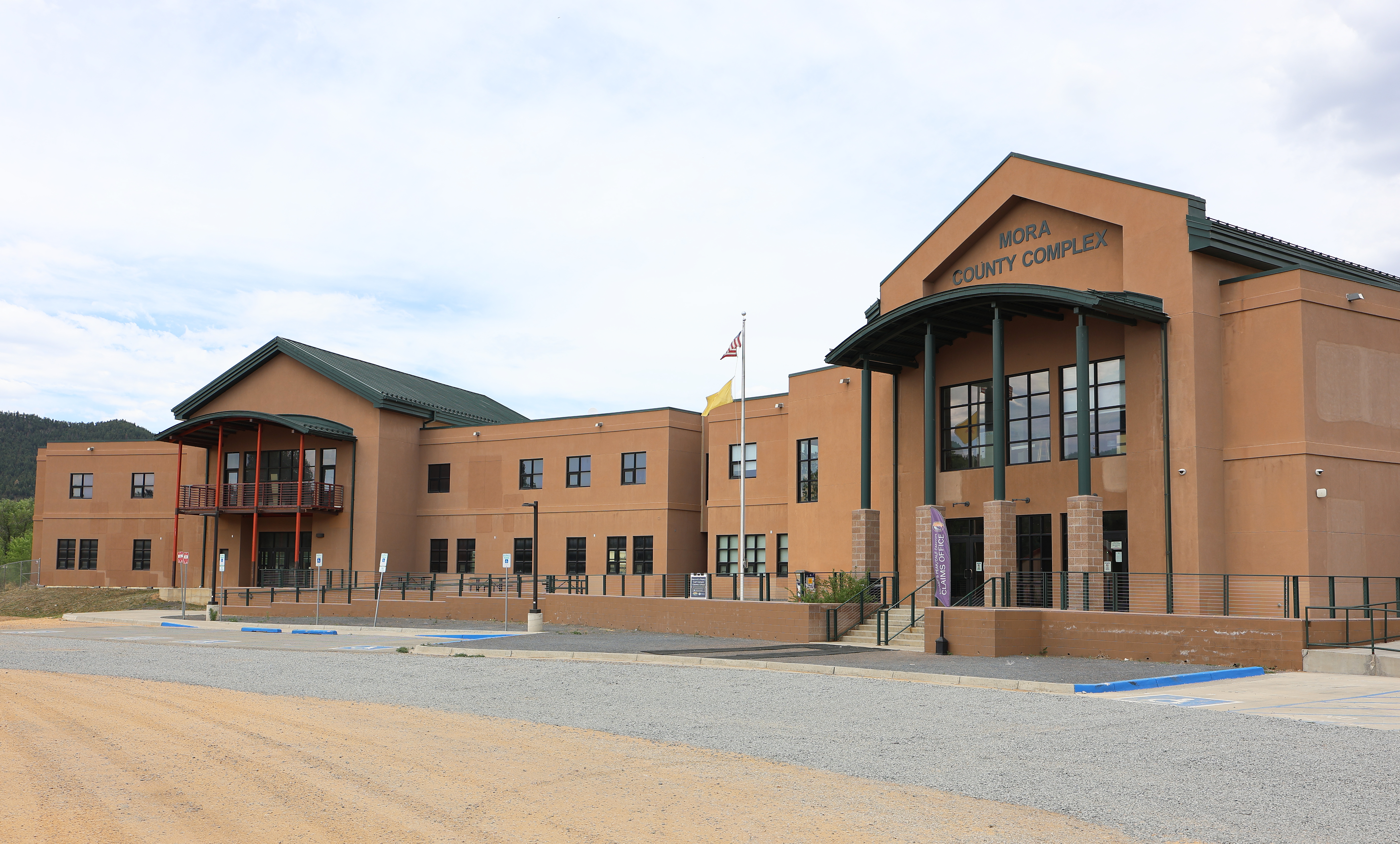
- The Mora County Complex in Mora

- Location within the U.S. state of New Mexico
- Coordinates: 36°01′N 104°56′W
- Country: United States
- State: New Mexico
- Founded: February 1, 1860
- Named for: Mora, New Mexico
- Seat: Mora
- Largest village: Mora

Area
  - Total: 1,934 sq mi (5,010 km^{2})
  - Land: 1,931 sq mi (5,000 km^{2})
  - Water: 2.3 sq mi (6.0 km^{2}) 0.1%

Population (2020)
  - Total: 4,189
  - Estimate (2025): 4,051 ▼
  - Density: 2.169/sq mi (0.8376/km^{2})
- Time zone: UTC−7 (Mountain)
  - Summer (DST): UTC−6 (MDT)
- Congressional district: 3rd
- Website: countyofmora.com

Mora County (Spanish: Condado de Mora) is a county in the U.S. state of New Mexico. As of the 2020 census, its population was 4,189. Its county seat is the census-designated place (CDP) Mora. The county has another CDP, Watrous, a village, Wagon Mound, and 12 smaller unincorporated settlements. Mora became a formal county in the US, in what was then the New Mexico Territory, on February 1, 1860. Ecclesiastically, the county is within the Roman Catholic Archdiocese of Santa Fe. County population peaked at about 14,000 circa 1920, declining to about 4,000 to 5,000 since the 1970s; the 2018 estimate was 4,506.

== History ==
Prior to Spanish conquest, the Mora area was Native American country. Although not an area of heavy settlement by stationary tribes such as the Puebloans, the Mora Valley was often used by nomadic nations, including the Ute, Navajo, and Apache.

=== Spanish period ===
Hispano settlers had occupied lands within the Mora Valley without legal title since Governor Juan Bautista de Anza of Nuevo México (then under the authority of the Spanish Empire) made peace with the Comanches in the late 18th century, opening up the east side of the Sangre de Cristo Mountains for settlement. The Mora Valley then became a travel way for various Spanish explorers and others. It was not permanently inhabited by colonists until the early 19th century. The written history of the settlement of Mora dates to Christian missionary church building in 1818, three years before Mexican independence from Spain.

=== Mexican period, and permanent settlement ===
The creation of the Mora Land Grant by the Mexican government of New Mexico in 1835 began the legal and extensive settlement of the county. The settlers came primarily from Las Trampas, but also from Picuris and Embudo, then from Santa Cruz de La Cañada, Taos, and the Ojo Caliente area, and later still from the southern part of New Mexico, moving on from the San Miguel del Vado Land Grant, and also coming in via Las Vegas, New Mexico. The families each received a strip of property by a September 28, 1835, land grant of Centralist Republic of Mexico Governor of New Mexico Albino Pérez. The grant gave land title for over 800,000 acres (1,250 square miles; around 323,800 hectares, or 3,200 km^{2}) in Mora Valley to various families willing to relocate; estimates vary from 25 to 76 families.

=== Texan and Mexican–American War periods ===
When the Republic of Texas seceded from Mexico on March 2, 1836, it claimed, but did not actually control eastern New Mexico, including what is now Mora County. The town of Mora was raided unsuccessfully in 1843 by a group of freebooters from the more narrowly defined Republic of Texas, on the pretext of stopping cattle rustling, but with a clear intent of horse theft and taking the local women and children as slaves. The annexation of Texas by the United States on February 19, 1846, and US General Stephen W. Kearny's taking of Santa Fe, New Mexico, in August of that year, made these lands subject to American control under the Kearny Code and the US provisional government of New Mexico, but the area remained in the minds of many long-term residents part of the Republic of Mexico under President Santa Ana.

During the Mexican–American War, beginning on April 25, 1846, much of New Mexico including Mora County was subject to the military occupation of United States under martial law. During the Taos Revolt of the war, Mexican nationalist Hispano and Puebloan militia fought the United States Army, repelling a small force in the First Battle of Mora on January 24, 1847, only to endure the village and surrounding ranches, farms, and crops being burned to the ground in the Second Battle of Mora on February 1, effectively ending active rebellion in the area. The provisional government's first legislature met on December 6, 1847, beginning American civil government in the region.

=== In the United States ===
The Mexican–American War ended February 3, 1848, with Mora Valley and rest of the region then under formal US control, as the Mexican Cession of the Treaty of Guadalupe Hidalgo relinquished all claims by Mexico to lands north of the Rio Grande. Still claimed by state of Texas until the Compromise of 1850, the New Mexico Territory, with smaller boundaries, was formalized on September 9 of that year.

A US Army installation, Fort Union, was built in 1851 in Mora Valley. It encroached on 8 square miles of private lands of the Mora Grant for its entire span of operation, without permission of or compensation to the local land owners. This led to a protracted legal controversy, reaching all the way to the General Land Office, the Secretary of War, and the US Congress; Nevertheless, the nearby fort and its garrison provided a stable source of income to local farmers, and several grist mills were founded in Mora, including a successful one opened in 1855 by regional trader and Taos Revolt US volunteer cavalry veteran Ceran St. Vrain. The US county of Mora was established in the territory on February 1, 1860. A church was built in the Mora Valley village of Chacon in 1864, reflecting additional settlement into the area. The Mora Grant / Fort Union land dispute was exacerbated in 1868 by an order of President Andrew Johnson that established a government timber reservation that encompassed 53 more square miles the private grant land (the entire Turkey Mountains subrange of the Sangre de Cristos). After being rebuilt twice, the fort eventually closed in 1891, still without restitution to land owners, despite the Kearny Code, Hidalgo Treaty, and other agreements supposedly guaranteeing continuity of Spanish and Mexican land-grant rights.

New Mexico (with reduced land area) became the 47th US state on January 6, 1912, despite concerns in Congress that the population was insufficiently assimilated into American culture, especially after an influx of Mexican refugees from 1910 onward, fleeing the Mexican Revolution. These newcomers mostly settled far south of Mora County, though it remained primarily Spanish-speaking, as it was still largely populated by the same, now-expanded, families who had settled the area three-quarters of a century earlier). On February 21, 1916, Special Master William E. Gortner sold off unallotted common lands of the Mora Grant to the State Investment Company and Edward B. Wheeler in an auction at the door of the San Miguel County Courthouse. Without access to the grazing and timbering lands, many residents sought work outside Mora.

In April 2013, Mora County became the first county in the United States to ban oil and gas drilling on public and private lands.

The modern county seat, Mora, is a census-designated place, and consists of four neighboring settlements and three plazas.

== Geography ==
According to the US Census Bureau, the county has a total area of 1,934 square miles (5,010 km^{2}), of which 2.3 square miles (6.0 km^{2}) (0.1%) are covered by water. The highest point in the county is the summit of Truchas Peak at 13,102 feet or 3,993 metres.

=== Adjacent counties ===
- Colfax County – north
- Harding County – east
- San Miguel County – south
- Santa Fe County – west
- Rio Arriba County – west
- Taos County – northwest

=== National protected areas ===
- Carson National Forest (part)
- Fort Union National Monument
- Kiowa National Grassland (part)
- Santa Fe National Forest (part)
- Rio Mora National Wildlife Refuge

== Demographics ==
Historical population
| Census | Pop. | Note | %± |
|---|---|---|---|
| 1860 | 5,566 | | — |
| 1870 | 8,056 | | 44.7% |
| 1880 | 9,751 | | 21.0% |
| 1890 | 10,618 | | 8.9% |
| 1900 | 10,304 | | −3.0% |
| 1910 | 12,611 | | 22.4% |
| 1920 | 13,915 | | 10.3% |
| 1930 | 10,322 | | −25.8% |
| 1940 | 10,981 | | 6.4% |
| 1950 | 8,720 | | −20.6% |
| 1960 | 6,028 | | −30.9% |
| 1970 | 4,673 | | −22.5% |
| 1980 | 4,205 | | −10.0% |
| 1990 | 4,264 | | 1.4% |
| 2000 | 5,180 | | 21.5% |
| 2010 | 4,881 | | −5.8% |
| 2020 | 4,189 | | −14.2% |
| 2025 (est.) | 4,051 | ▼ | −3.3% |
US Decennial Census; 1790–1960 1900–1990; 1990–2000 2010

=== 2020 census ===
As of the 2020 census, the county had a population of 4,189. The median age was 53.8 years. 16.5% of residents were under the age of 18 and 29.0% of residents were 65 years of age or older. For every 100 females there were 103.9 males, and for every 100 females age 18 and over there were 101.9 males age 18 and over.

Mora County, New Mexico – Racial and ethnic composition Note: the US Census treats Hispanic/Latino as an ethnic category. This table excludes Latinos from the racial categories and assigns them to a separate category. Hispanics/Latinos may be of any race.
| Race / Ethnicity (NH = Non-Hispanic) | Pop 2000 | Pop 2010 | Pop 2020 | % 2000 | % 2010 | % 2020 |
|---|---|---|---|---|---|---|
| White alone (NH) | 877 | 873 | 764 | 16.93% | 17.89% | 18.24% |
| Black or African American alone (NH) | 5 | 10 | 10 | 0.10% | 0.20% | 0.24% |
| Native American or Alaska Native alone (NH) | 43 | 17 | 22 | 0.83% | 0.35% | 0.53% |
| Asian alone (NH) | 2 | 11 | 14 | 0.04% | 0.23% | 0.33% |
| Pacific Islander alone (NH) | 0 | 1 | 0 | 0.00% | 0.02% | 0.00% |
| Other race alone (NH) | 4 | 1 | 10 | 0.08% | 0.02% | 0.24% |
| Mixed race or Multiracial (NH) | 20 | 15 | 68 | 0.39% | 0.31% | 1.62% |
| Hispanic or Latino (any race) | 4,229 | 3,953 | 3,301 | 81.64% | 80.99% | 78.80% |
| Total | 5,180 | 4,881 | 4,189 | 100.00% | 100.00% | 100.00% |

The racial makeup of the county was 48.2% White, 0.3% Black or African American, 2.7% American Indian and Alaska Native, 0.4% Asian, 0.0% Native Hawaiian and Pacific Islander, 16.8% from some other race, and 31.6% from two or more races. Hispanic or Latino residents of any race comprised 78.8% of the population.

0.0% of residents lived in urban areas, while 100.0% lived in rural areas.

There were 1,895 households in the county, of which 22.1% had children under the age of 18 living with them and 26.0% had a female householder with no spouse or partner present. About 34.3% of all households were made up of individuals and 17.1% had someone living alone who was 65 years of age or older.

There were 2,866 housing units, of which 33.9% were vacant. Among occupied housing units, 83.7% were owner-occupied and 16.3% were renter-occupied. The homeowner vacancy rate was 2.2% and the rental vacancy rate was 5.4%.

=== 2010 census ===
As of the 2010 census, 4,881 people, 2,114 households, and 1,295 families resided in the county. The population density was 2.5 inhabitants per square mile (0.97 inhabitants/km^{2}). There were 3,232 housing units at an average density of 1.7 units per square mile (0.66 units/km^{2}). The racial makeup of the county was 70.9% white, 1.3% American Indian, 0.7% Black or African American, 0.3% Asian, 23.5% from other races, and 3.3% from two or more races. Those of Hispanic or Latino origin made up 81.0% of the population. In terms of ancestry, and 0.8% were American.

Of the 2,114 households, 26.4% had children under the age of 18 living with them, 43.5% were married couples living together, 10.9% had a female householder with no husband present, 38.7% were not families, and 33.2% of all households were made up of individuals. The average household size was 2.31 and the average family size was 2.92. The median age was 46.0 years.

The median income for a household in the county was $37,784 and for a family was $42,122. Males had a median income of $42,992 versus $42,630 for females. The per capita income for the county was $22,035. About 10.5% of families and 11.9% of the population were below the poverty line, including 10.8% of those under age 18 and 20.6% of those age 65 or over.

=== 2000 census ===
As of the 2000 census, 5,180 people, 2,017 households, and 1,397 families lived in the county. The population density was 3 people per square mile (1.2 people/km^{2}). The 2,973 housing units had an average density of 2 units per square mile (0.77/km^{2}). The racial makeup of the county was 58.88% White, 0.10% African American, 1.14% Native American, 0.12% Asian, 36.97% from other races, and 2.80% from two or more races; 81.64% of the population were Hispanic or Latino of any race.

Of the 2,017 households, 31.2% had children under 18 living with them, 50.5% were married couples living together, 11.9% had a female householder with no husband present, and 30.7% were not families. Of all households, 26.90% were made up of individuals, and 10.6% had someone living alone who was 65 or older. The average household size was 2.54 and the average family size was 3.08.

In the county, the population distribution was 26.7% under 18, 7.5% from 18 to 24, 24.3% from 25 to 44, 26.1% from 45 to 64, and 15.4% who were 65 or older. The median age was 40 years. For every 100 females, there were 102 males. For every 100 females 18 and over, there were 100.2 males.

The median income for a household in the county was US$24,518, and for a family was $27,648. Males had a median income of $24,483 versus $18,000 for females. The per capita income for the county was $12,340. About 20.9% of families and 25.4% of the population were below the poverty line, including 25.9% of those under 18 and 18.40% of those 65 or over.

== Place of interest ==
- Fort Union National Monument

== Communities ==
=== Village ===
- Wagon Mound

=== Census-designated places ===
- La Cueva
- Mora (county seat)
- Watrous

=== Unincorporated communities ===
- Buena Vista
- Canoncito
- Chacon
- Cleveland
- Golondrinas
- Guadalupita
- Holman
- Ledoux
- Ocate
- Ojo Feliz
- Rainsville

=== Former Community ===
- Valmora (now a private retreat center)

== Politics ==
United States presidential election results for Mora County, New Mexico
| Year | Republican | | Democratic | | Third party(ies) | |
| Year | No. | % | No. | % | No. | % |
|---|---|---|---|---|---|---|
| 1912 | 1,022 | 43.83% | 1,002 | 42.97% | 308 | 13.21% |
| 1916 | 1,590 | 51.16% | 1,505 | 48.42% | 13 | 0.42% |
| 1920 | 2,478 | 52.89% | 2,179 | 46.51% | 28 | 0.60% |
| 1924 | 2,197 | 50.90% | 2,087 | 48.35% | 32 | 0.74% |
| 1928 | 1,998 | 52.62% | 1,799 | 47.38% | 0 | 0.00% |
| 1932 | 1,444 | 32.77% | 2,962 | 67.21% | 1 | 0.02% |
| 1936 | 2,259 | 47.81% | 2,460 | 52.06% | 6 | 0.13% |
| 1940 | 2,440 | 55.44% | 1,960 | 44.54% | 1 | 0.02% |
| 1944 | 1,783 | 55.56% | 1,425 | 44.41% | 1 | 0.03% |
| 1948 | 1,893 | 55.08% | 1,541 | 44.84% | 3 | 0.09% |
| 1952 | 1,849 | 56.61% | 1,413 | 43.26% | 4 | 0.12% |
| 1956 | 1,736 | 58.47% | 1,233 | 41.53% | 0 | 0.00% |
| 1960 | 1,349 | 48.06% | 1,458 | 51.94% | 0 | 0.00% |
| 1964 | 1,014 | 40.13% | 1,509 | 59.72% | 4 | 0.16% |
| 1968 | 1,155 | 50.97% | 1,069 | 47.18% | 42 | 1.85% |
| 1972 | 1,165 | 50.26% | 1,135 | 48.96% | 18 | 0.78% |
| 1976 | 904 | 38.29% | 1,438 | 60.91% | 19 | 0.80% |
| 1980 | 1,037 | 43.48% | 1,274 | 53.42% | 74 | 3.10% |
| 1984 | 1,017 | 44.47% | 1,235 | 54.00% | 35 | 1.53% |
| 1988 | 923 | 36.27% | 1,601 | 62.91% | 21 | 0.83% |
| 1992 | 668 | 27.59% | 1,555 | 64.23% | 198 | 8.18% |
| 1996 | 561 | 23.43% | 1,646 | 68.76% | 187 | 7.81% |
| 2000 | 668 | 30.49% | 1,456 | 66.45% | 67 | 3.06% |
| 2004 | 928 | 32.84% | 1,876 | 66.38% | 22 | 0.78% |
| 2008 | 569 | 20.62% | 2,168 | 78.55% | 23 | 0.83% |
| 2012 | 595 | 22.79% | 1,955 | 74.88% | 61 | 2.34% |
| 2016 | 665 | 27.24% | 1,536 | 62.93% | 240 | 9.83% |
| 2020 | 903 | 33.62% | 1,745 | 64.97% | 38 | 1.41% |
| 2024 | 1,010 | 40.61% | 1,439 | 57.86% | 38 | 1.53% |

Mora County has voted for the presidential nominee of the Democratic Party in every election since 1976; prior to that, it leaned Republican. However, Mora County has experienced a strong shift to the Republicans in recent years, as with most Hispanic-majority counties across the country. 2024 marked the first time since 1984 that a Republican presidential candidate won at least 40% of the vote in Mora County, and also the first time since 1984 that a Republican presidential candidate won at least 1,000 votes.

== Education ==
School districts:

- Las Vegas City Public Schools
- Mora Independent Schools
- Wagon Mound Public Schools

== Transportation ==
=== Major highways ===
- I-25 / US 85 (unsigned)
- NM 94
- NM 97
- NM 105
- NM 120
- NM 121
- NM 161
- NM 271
- NM 434
- NM 442
- NM 518

== See also ==
- National Register of Historic Places listings in Mora County, New Mexico
