= Mora, New Mexico =

- Census-designated place
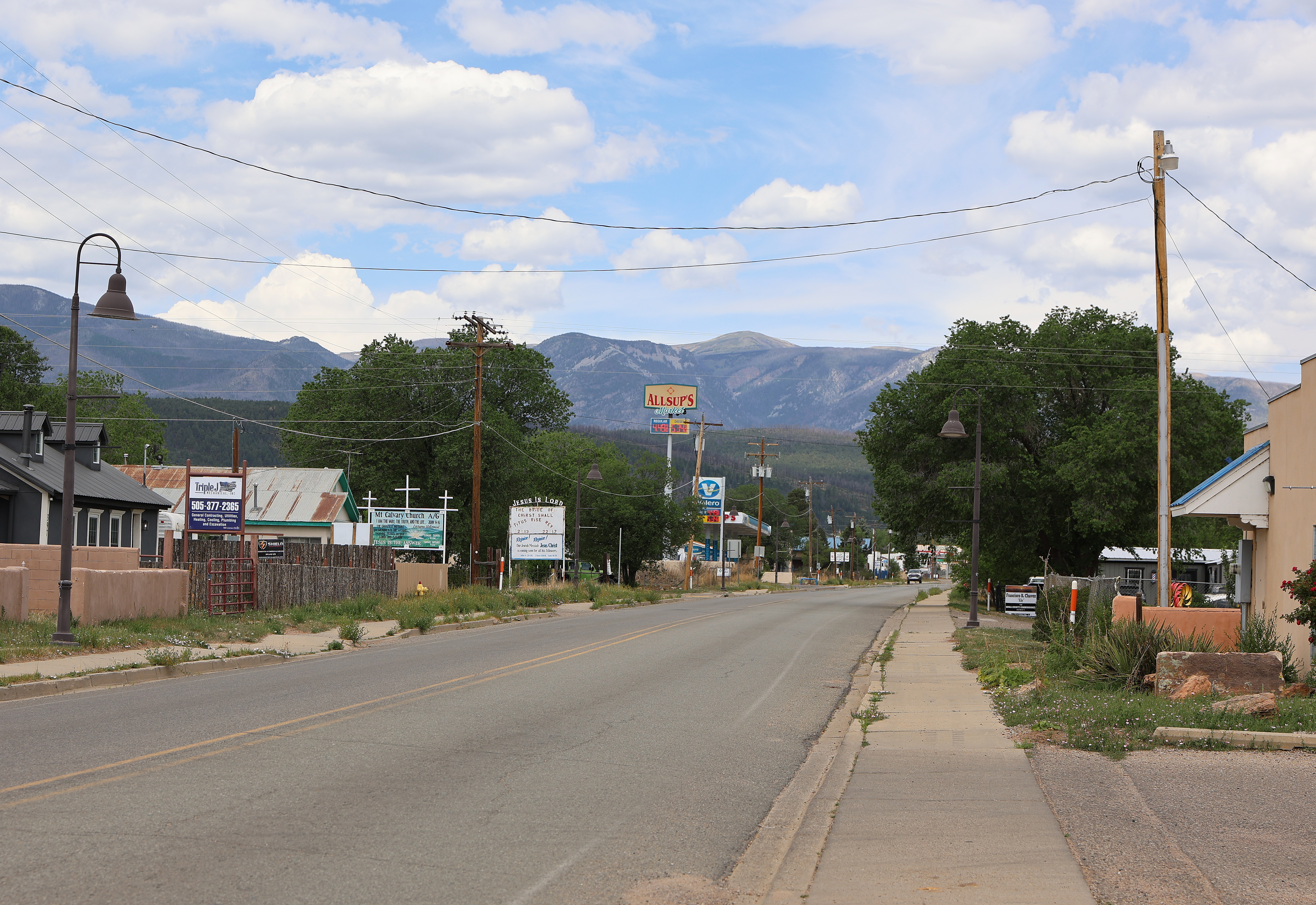
- Main Street, also called State Road 518 (2026)

- Location within the state of New Mexico
- Coordinates: 35°58′27″N 105°19′48″W
- Country: United States
- State: New Mexico
- County: Mora County

Area
  - Total: 8.03 sq mi (20.81 km^{2})
  - Land: 8.03 sq mi (20.81 km^{2})
  - Water: 0 sq mi (0.00 km^{2})
- Elevation: 7,172 ft (2,186 m)

Population (2020)
  - Total: 547
  - Density: 68.1/sq mi (26.29/km^{2})
- Time zone: UTC-7 (MST)
  - Summer (DST): UTC-6 (MDT)
- ZIP Code: 87732
- Area code: 575
- FIPS code: 35-50090
- GNIS feature ID: 0915867

Mora or Santa Gertrudis de lo de Mora is an unincorporated community and census-designated place (CDP) in Mora County, New Mexico, United States. It is the seat of Mora County. It is located about halfway between Las Vegas and Taos on Highway 518, at an altitude of 7,180 feet (2,190 m). As of the 2020 census, the population of Mora was 547, down from 656 in 2010.

The Mora area includes three plazas and four settlements: Mora proper (corresponding to the CDP); Cleveland (originally named San Antonio), 2 miles (3 km) to the northwest; Chacon, 11 miles (18 km) north of Cleveland; and Holman (without a plaza, and originally named Agua Negra) lying between Chacon and Cleveland. In the mid-19th century, there were two settlements, Upper and Lower Mora.

The Republic of Texas performed a semi-official raid on Mora in 1843. Two short battles of the Mexican–American War were fought in Mora in 1847, where U.S. troops eventually defeated the Hispano and Puebloan militia, effectively ending the Taos Revolt in the Mora Valley. The latter battle destroyed most of the community, necessitating its re-establishment.

== History ==
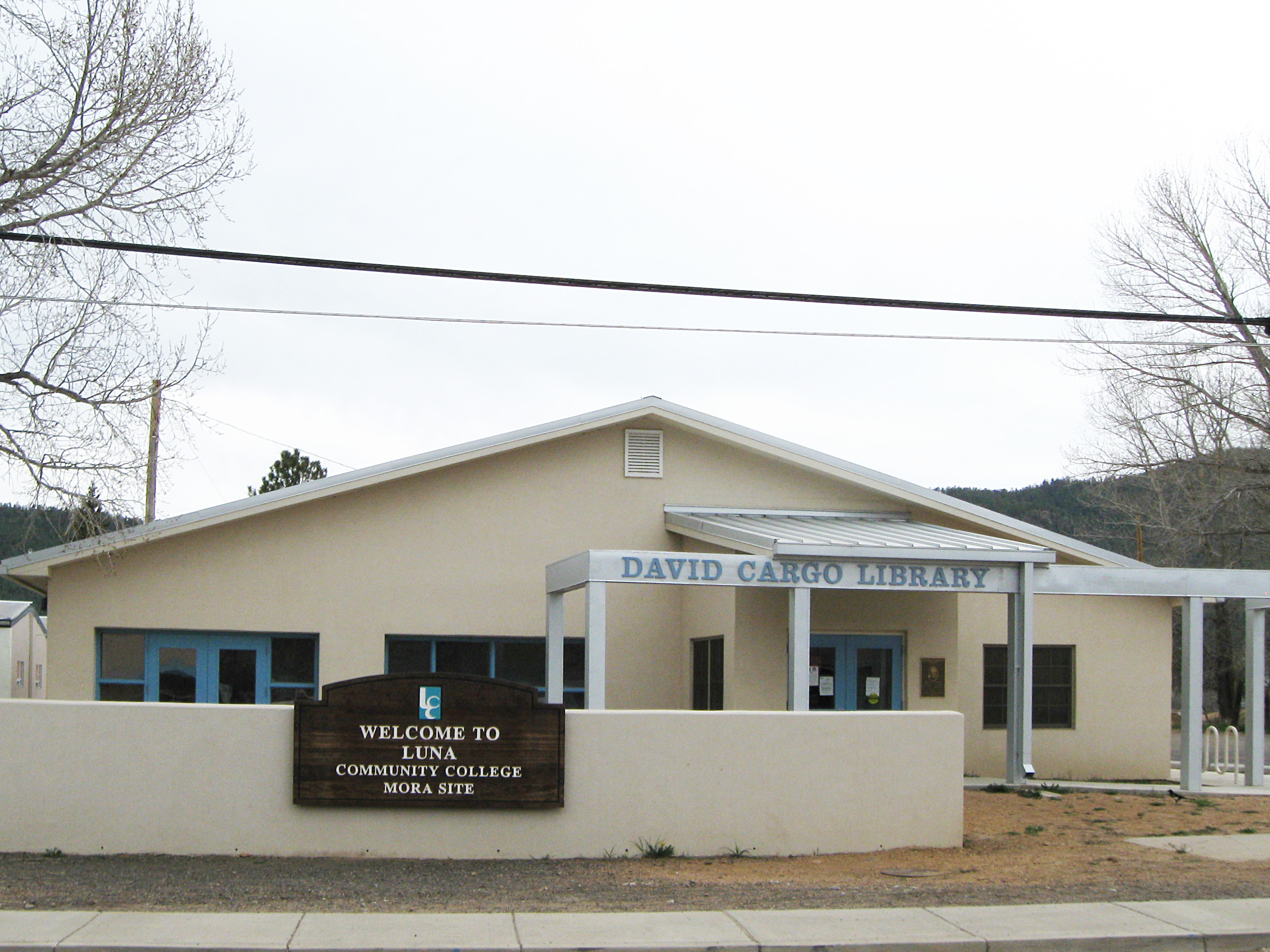
David F. Cargo Library in Mora

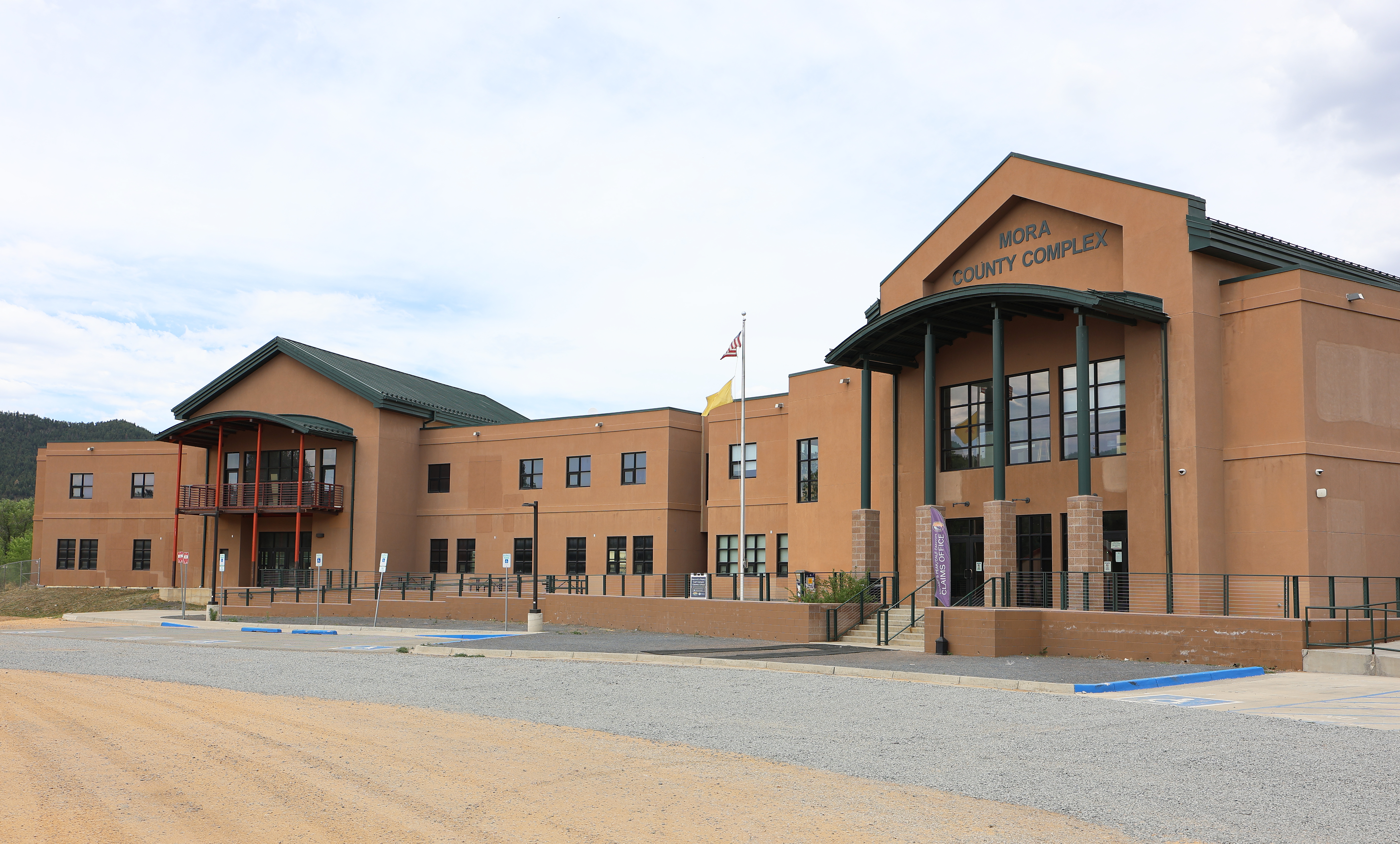
The 2019 Mora County Complex

=== Early settlement of the area ===
Spanish settlers had sporadically occupied what is now known as the Mora Valley since the late 18th century. The surviving written history of the settlement of Mora dates to 1818, when a group of settlers petitioned to build a church in what was then named "Lo de Mora"; or in long form Santa Gertrudis de lo de Mora; they had come from San Juan de los Caballeros (originally Caypa Pueblo, and today named Ohkay Owingeh).

However, Mora was formally founded as a Hispanic farming community – after Mexican independence from Spain – upon a land grant issued September 28, 1835, by Centralist Republic of Mexico Governor of Nuevo Mexico Albino Pérez. The Mora Land Grant provided title to a strip of Mora Valley land to each of dozens of families willing to settle there. Despite fanciful stories about subsistence on berries (mora means "mulberry" in Spanish), the valley, the river, the town, and eventually the county appear to have taken their name from the family name Mora, borne by several of the settlers. While mulberry trees are found in the area, they were likely introduced by Spanish or later settlers.

The whole eastern half of New Mexico was claimed by the breakaway Republic of Texas in 1836, but was not occupied by American troops until the arrival of Stephen W. Kearny and his Army of the West in 1846.

=== The town ===
The settlement, of Hispanos from elsewhere in New Mexico and local Puebloans, was well established by 1843, when there was a raid on the town by freebooters from the Republic of Texas under Colonel Charles A. Warfield, claiming that the people in Mora had purchased stolen Texan cattle from the Comanche. The Texans killed five men and took eighteen women and children captive, as well as 75 horses. However, a camp of New Mexican ciboleros (bison hunters) responded and on June 14 near Wagon Mound attacked Warfield and recaptured their horses and left him on foot. Warfield and his men had to walk 200 miles (320 km) to Bent's Fort in Colorado, the nearest place where he could receive help.

Mora was subject to occupying United States control under the U.S. provisional government of New Mexico beginning in 1846, during the Mexican–American War. The town, then consisting of the two settlements of Upper and Lower Mora, (sometimes misspelled "Moro" in American documents of the era) was the site of two armed conflicts between United States Army troops and a militia of Hispano and Puebloan Mexican-nationalists, in the Taos Revolt, a guerrilla campaign of the war. In the First Battle of Mora, on January 24, 1847, a group of over 150 New Mexican resistance fighters repelled an expedition of 80 US Army troops and killed their commander, Captain Israel R. Hendley, and several others. On February 1, Capt. Jesse I. Morin and his 200 men, with artillery, destroyed the village and surrounding ranches and crops, in retaliation. This sent surviving combatant and civilian residents of Mora and its environs fleeing into and over the mountains to other settlements. The town was rebuilt some time later, after crops could be re-established. This destruction has made historical and genealogical research on Mora difficult earlier than 1848, because most early records went up in flames with the buildings.

The entire war ended February 3, 1848, with all of New Mexico then under official US control, as the Mexican Cession of the Treaty of Guadalupe Hidalgo relinquished all claims by Mexico to lands north of the Rio Grande. The New Mexico Territory was formalized by the Compromise of 1850. The US Army controversially built Fort Union in 1851 on private Mora Grant land in the valley, along the Santa Fe Trail; while this sparked decades of unresolved legal actions, local farmers sold crops to the fort, which was a new and reliable source of income to the community, and the population swelled. Ceran St. Vrain, an American veteran of the Taos Revolt (originally from St. Louis in what was then the French Upper Louisiana Territory), settled in Mora in 1853; he built a grist mill, and became a major supplier of flour, grain, and fodder to the fort. The ruins of St. Vrain's mill still sit one block north of Mora's main street.

The county of Mora was established in the territory on February 1, 1860. Mora continued to grow as an agricultural community; by the late 19th century, there were five mills operating in Mora, though Fort Union, after being rebuilt for a second time, was finally closed in 1891. The population peaked around 1920, declined markedly for several decades, then stabilized in the 1970s. It remains about 80% hispanic.

== Geography ==
Mora is in western Mora County, in the valley of the Mora River along the eastern edge of the Sangre de Cristo Mountains. New Mexico State Road 518 passes through the center of the community, leading south 30 miles (48 km) to Las Vegas and north-northwest over the Sangre de Cristos 47 miles (76 km) to Taos, passing through Cleveland and Holman along the way. SR 434 leads north from Mora 36 miles (58 km) to U.S. Route 64 at Agua Fria, while SR 94 leads south 9 miles (14 km) to the Quebraditas Valley.

According to the U.S. Census Bureau, the Mora CDP has an area of 8.0 square miles (20.7 km^{2}), all of it recorded as land. The Mora River passes through the center of the community, flowing southeast to join the Canadian River in San Miguel County.

== Demographics ==
Historical population
Census	Pop.	Note	%±
2010	656		—
2020	547		−16.6%
U.S. Decennial Census

== Notable people ==
- Floyd Esquibel, member of the Wyoming Senate and former member of the Wyoming House of Representatives; born in Mora in 1938
- Paulita Maxwell Jaramillo, born in Mora, daughter of Lucien Maxwell, and a friend of Billy the Kid
- Ceran St. Vrain (1802–1870), trapper and successful trader, who later became a military volunteer unit leader against the Taos Revolt. He moved to Mora in 1855 to open a grain mill, and later started one of Northern New Mexico's first English-language newspapers, the Santa Fe Gazette. He died in Mora in 1870, and had a funeral attended by over 2,000, including the Fort Union garrison.
- Abraham Ledoux (1784–1842) and Antoine Ledoux (1779– ?), two French brothers born in Québec, who became trappers and settled in Mora and Taos. The village of Ledoux in Mora County and a street in Taos are named after them.

== Cultural references ==
Dom Guéranger's 1903 English Translation of the 15th volume of The Liturgical Year mentions a town in New Mexico bearing the name of St. Gertrude the Great on her feast day entry, November 15.

The settlement is mentioned in Willa Cather's 1927 historical novel Death Comes for the Archbishop (Book Two, Chapter 2), about the establishment of the Roman Catholic Archdiocese of Santa Fe.

Frank Waters' 1941 novel People of the Valley takes place high in the Sangre de Cristo Mountains where an isolated Spanish-speaking community (based on Mora) confront a threatening world of change.

Mora was mentioned in Louis L'Amour's 1960 Western novel The Daybreakers, in which the character Orrin Sackett is the fictional marshal of Mora.
