= Coyote Creek (Mora River tributary) =

River in New Mexico, United States

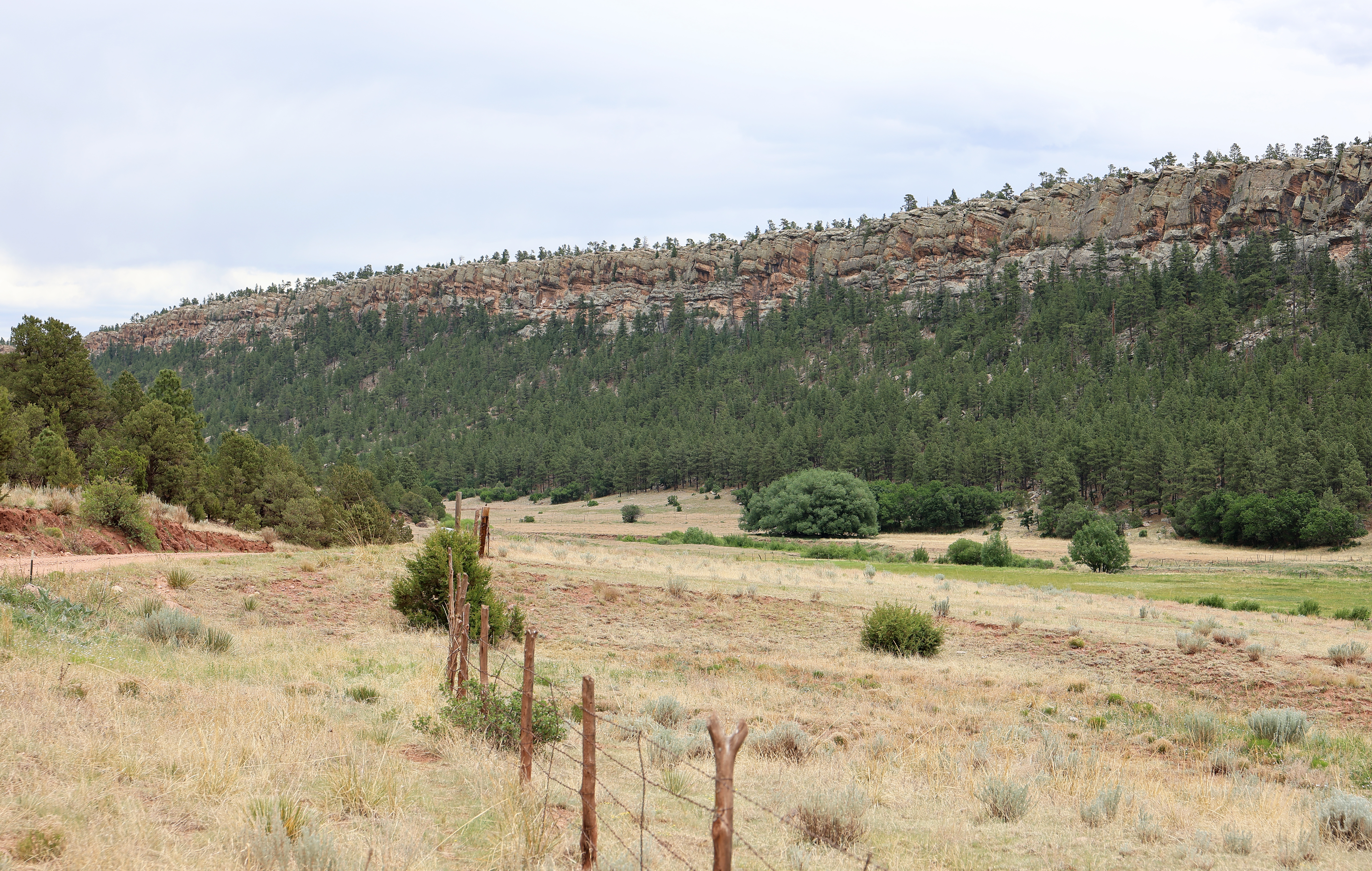
- Coyote Creek valley near Guadalupita. The creek flows in the channel in the center of the picture

- The location of the creek's mouth in New Mexico

Physical characteristics
- Source
  - coordinates: 36°20′49.11″N 105°19′42.04″W
- Mouth
  - location: east of Golondrinas, New Mexico
  - coordinates: 35°53′43.14″N 105°8′27.03″W
  - elevation: 6,719 feet (2,048 meters)

Basin features
- Progression: Mora River → Canadian River → Arkansas → Mississippi
- Tributaries
  - left: Little Coyote Creek; South Fork
  - right: Jarosa Creek; Little Blue Creek; Big Blue Creek

Coyote Creek is a tributary of the Mora River in Colfax and Mora counties in New Mexico, U.S. The creek passes through one state park and is part of a historic district listed on the National Register of Historic Places.

== Course ==
The creek rises near Osha Pass, north of Osha Mountain, in the Sangre de Cristo Mountains of Carson National Forest in Colfax County, New Mexico. From there, it travels east across the southern Moreno Valley to the Black Lake area. From here it turns south, passing through Coyote Creek State Park. It continues south, passing through Williams Canyon and Guadalupita, and through the Coyote Creek valley. At Lucero, the creek heads east through a gap, then it passes under New Mexico State Road 442 near Rainsville. From here the creek turns south to its confluence with the Mora River east of Golondrinas and near New Mexico State Road 161.

== State park ==
Coyote Creek State Park, elevation 7,667 feet (2,337 meters), is named for the creek, and the creek flows through the park. The state park lies north of Mora on New Mexico State Road 434. The park offers fishing, birding and camping.

== Historic district ==
Part of the creek lies within the Guadalupita-Coyote Rural Historic District, which is listed on the National Register of Historic Places. The section of the creek within the district is the Coyote Creek valley between and just east of Guadalupita and Lucero in Mora County. Here, the creek has historically supplied water to acequias used by farming families in the area. The valley sits between modest hills on its west side and a dramatic sandstone wall on its east side, the western edge of a volcanic mesa. The basalt-capped mesa has prevented the sandstone below from eroding, creating a stark cliff.

== See also ==
- List of rivers of New Mexico
