= Ocate =

Ocate or OCATE may refer to:

- Ocate, New Mexico, United States, an unincorporated community
- Ocate Peak, New Mexico
- Ocate volcanic field, New Mexico
- Oregon Center for Advanced Technology Education
