= New Mexico State Road 518 =

State highway in New Mexico, United States

State Road 518
- NM 518 highlighted in red

Route information
- Maintained by NMDOT
- Length: 72.899 mi (117.320 km)
- Tourist routes: Part of High Road to Taos Scenic Byway between NM 75 and NM 68

Major junctions
- South end: 7th Street / Mills Ave. in Las Vegas
- NM 442 in La Cueva; NM 434 in Mora; NM 75 west of Sipapu Ski Area 4.8 miles
- North end: NM 68 in Ranchos de Taos

Location
- Country: United States
- State: New Mexico
- Counties: San Miguel, Mora, Taos

Highway system
- New Mexico State Highway System; Interstate; US; State; Scenic
← NM 516	→ NM 519

State Road 518 (NM 518) is a 72.899-mile-long (117.320 km) state highway in northern New Mexico. NM 518 begins as a continuation of 7th Street at Mills Avenue near Interstate 25 (I-25) in Las Vegas. It proceeds north to La Cueva where the road turns northwest at its junction with NM 442. The road continues northwest through Mora and eventually ends in Ranchos de Taos at its northern terminus at NM 68. The segment of NM 518 between Mora and Ranchos de Taos passes through the rugged terrain of the Sangre de Cristo Mountains and provides access to Carson National Forest where camping, fishing, skiing, and other recreational opportunities are available.

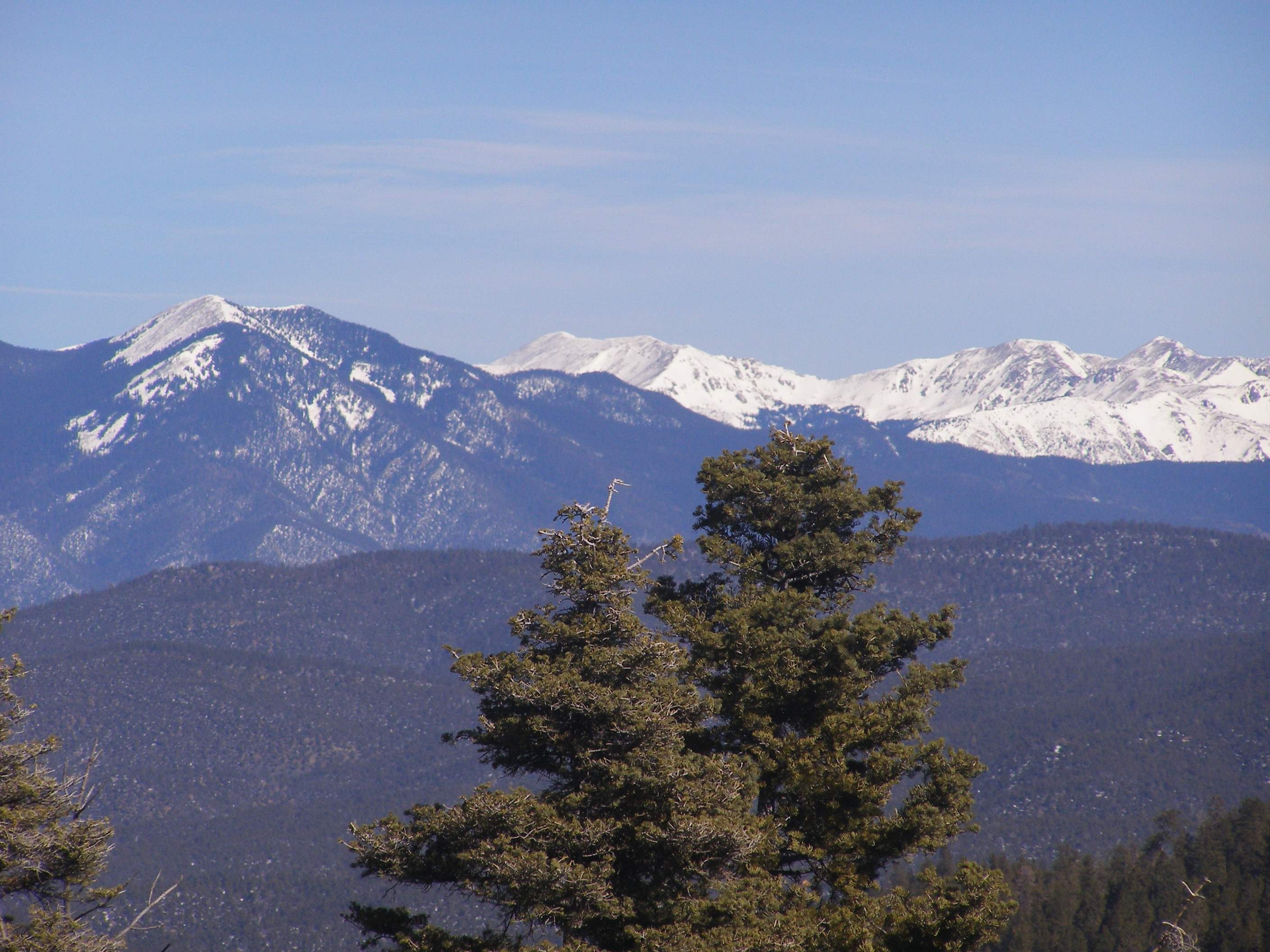
Telephoto view of the high Sangre de Cristo Range from the overlook between mileposts 60 and 61, on US Hill, February 2007.

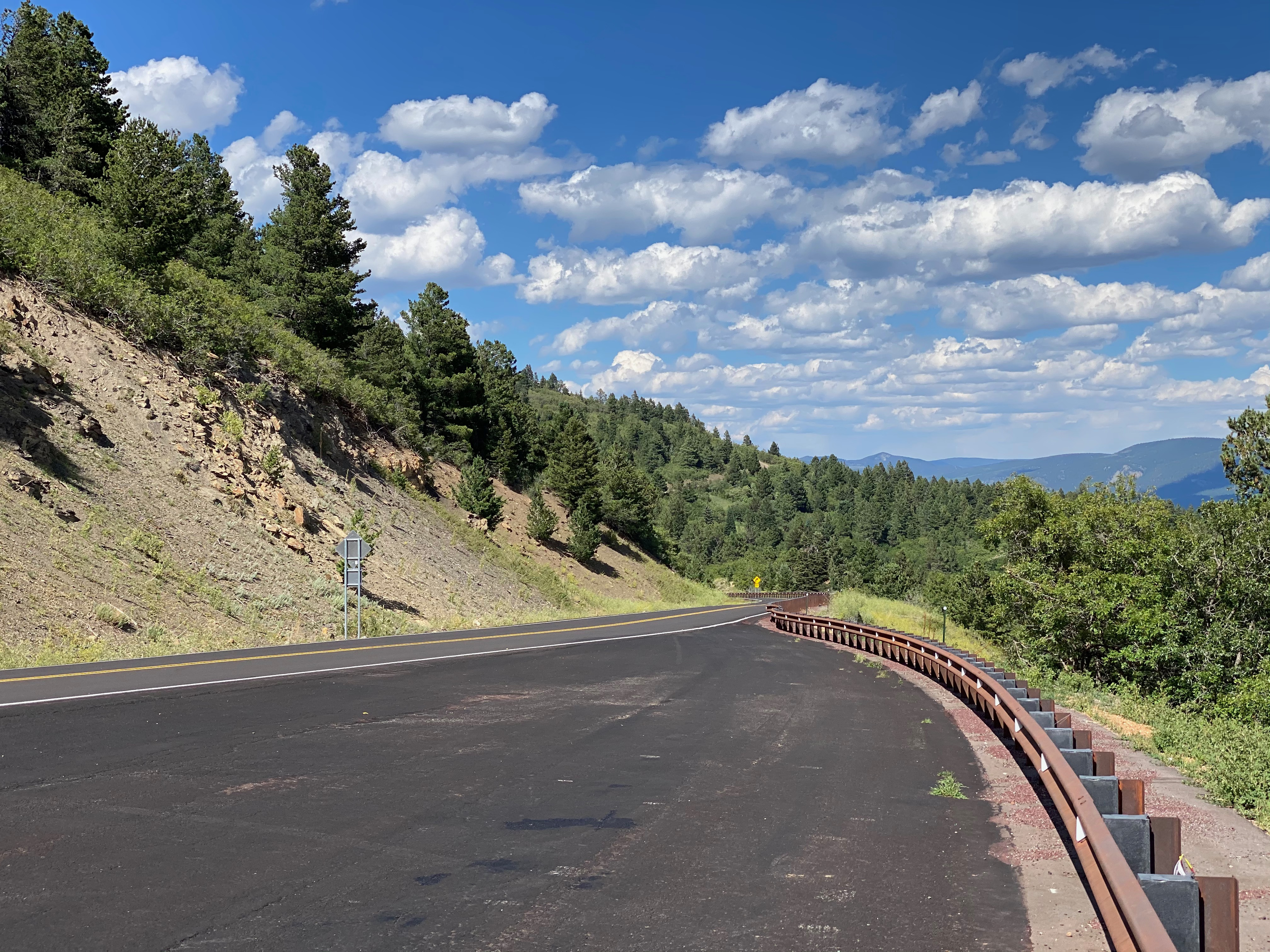
New Mexico State Highway 518 between Holman and Tres Ritos

== Major intersections ==
County	Location	mi	km	Destinations	Notes
San Miguel	Las Vegas	0.000	0.000	7th Street / Santa Fe Trail Scenic Byway to I-25 BL / I-25	Continuation beyond Mills Avenue to I-25 Bus. to I-25
San Miguel	Las Vegas	0.000	0.000	Mills Avenue	Southern terminus; former routing of NM 329
San Miguel	Sapello	10.862	17.481	NM 94 – San Ignacio, Pendaries	Southern terminus of NM 94
Mora	Buena Vista	21.052	33.880	NM 161 / Santa Fe Trail Scenic Byway – Buena Vista, Golondrinas, Watrous	Western terminus of NM 161
Mora	La Cueva	23.852	38.386	NM 442 – La Cueva, Rainsville	Southern terminus of NM 442
Mora	Mora	29.043	46.740	NM 94 – Morphy Lake State Park, Pendaries	Northern terminus of NM 94
Mora	Mora	29.221	47.027	NM 434 – Guadalupita, Angel Fire, Coyote Creek State Park	Southern terminus of NM 434
Mora		36.164	58.200	NM 121 – Chacon	Southern terminus of NM 121
Taos		57.037	91.792	NM 75 / High Road to Taos Scenic Byway – Penasco, Picuris, Pueblo	Eastern terminus of NM 75
Taos	Ranchos de Taos	72.899	117.320	NM 68 / High Road to Taos Scenic Byway ends – Santa Fe, Taos	Northern terminus
1.000 mi = 1.609 km; 1.000 km = 0.621 mi
