= Wagon Mound (disambiguation) =

Wagon Mound refers to a number of subjects:

- Wagon Mound National Historic Landmark, a butte and camp near town of Wagon Mound, New Mexico
- Wagon Mound, New Mexico, the town
- Two cases relating to SS Wagon Mound:
  - Overseas Tankship (UK) Ltd v Morts Dock and Engineering Co Ltd, known as "Wagon Mound (No. 1)"
  - Overseas Tankship (UK) Ltd v The Miller Steamship Co, known as "Wagon Mound (No. 2)"
