= J. P. Strong Store =

- U.S. National Register of Historic Places
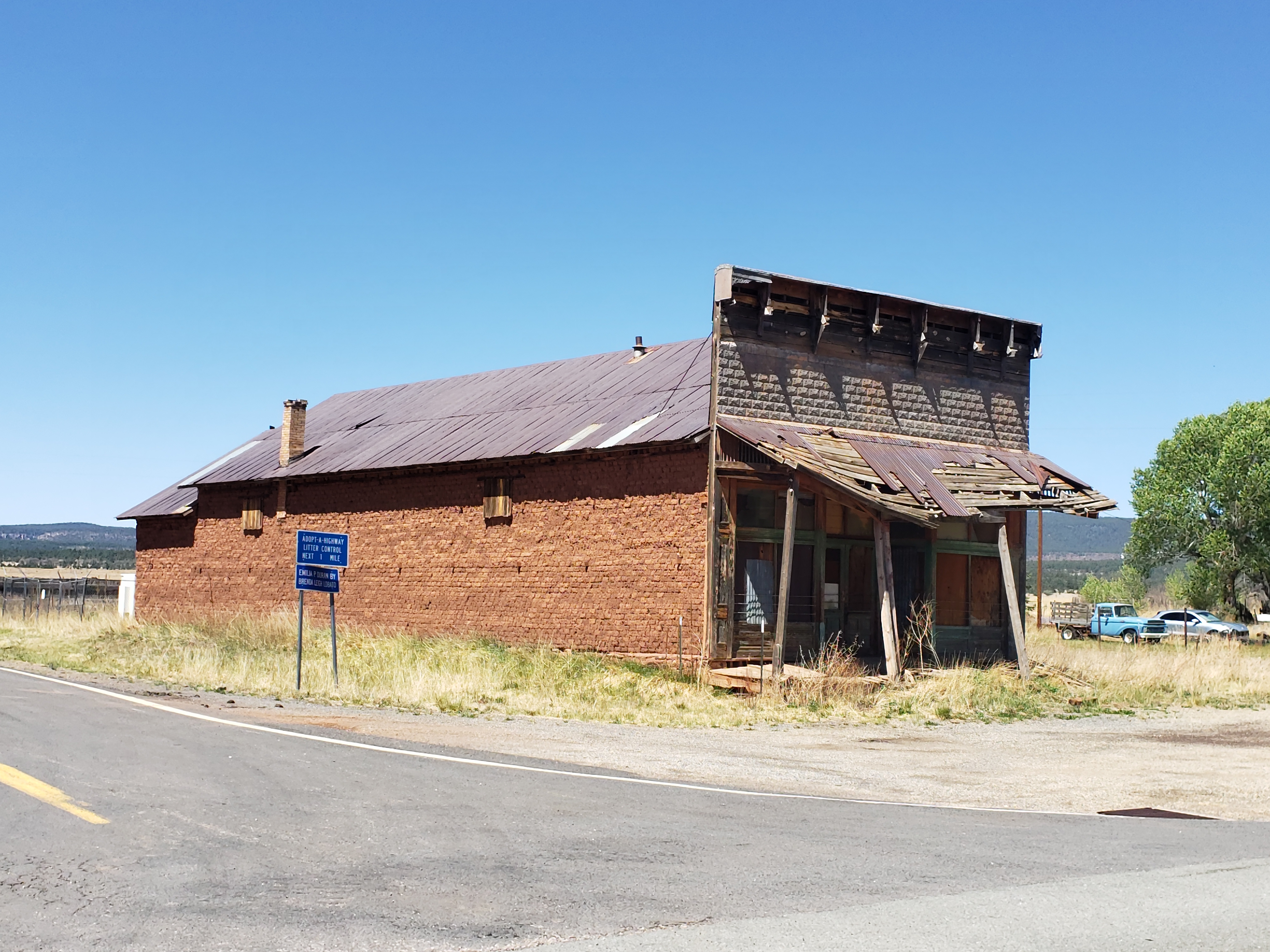

- Location within New Mexico
- Location: NM 120 and NM 442, Ocate, New Mexico
- Coordinates: 36.175315°N 105.048666°W
- Area: less than one acre
- Built: c.1906
- NRHP reference No.: 79001542
- Added to NRHP: July 27, 1979

The J.P. Strong Store, on the southwest corner of the junction of NM 120 and NM 442 in Ocate, New Mexico, was built around 1906 by French immigrant Nathan Weil. It was listed on the National Register of Historic Places in 1979.

It was deemed significant as "an excellent example of a southwestern general store. At the time of its construction the crossroads merchant in New Mexico's ranch country was not only the purveyor of a wide variety of goods but also was often an important purchaser of the area's produce-cattle,, sheep, wool, hides and grain. In addition he usually served as the village postmaster and notary public and the store itself served as the region's political and social center. Since its establishment at the turn of the century the Strong Store served these functions under three different owners for the next 70 years."

The Narciso Valdez House, also National Register-listed, is across the street.
