= New Mexico State Road 266 =

State highway in New Mexico, United States

State Road 266
- NM 266 highlighted in red

Route information
- Maintained by NMDOT
- Length: 6.400 mi (10.300 km)

Major junctions
- West end: End of state maintenance by San Ignacio
- East end: NM 94 near Sapello

Location
- Country: United States
- State: New Mexico
- Counties: San Miguel

Highway system
- New Mexico State Highway System; Interstate; US; State; Scenic
← NM 265	→ NM 267

State Road 266 (NM 266) is a state highway in the US state of New Mexico. Its total length is approximately 6.4 miles (10.3 km). NM 266's western terminus is at the end of state maintenance by San Ignacio, and the eastern terminus is at NM 94 west of Sapello.

== Major intersections ==
The entire route is in San Miguel County.

Location	mi	km	Destinations	Notes
	0.000	0.000	NM 94	Eastern terminus
	6.400	10.300	End of state maintenance	Western terminus
1.000 mi = 1.609 km; 1.000 km = 0.621 mi
