= Ebright =

Ebright is a surname. Notable people with the surname include:

- A. M. Ebright (1881–1947), American college sports coach
- Hi Ebright (1859–1916), American baseball player
- Ky Ebright (1894–1979), American crew athlete and coach
- Malcolm Ebright (1932-2025), American land grant historian, author, advocate, and attorney
- Richard H. Ebright, American molecular biologist
- Thomas Ebright, namesake of the Thomas Ebright Memorial Award

== See also ==
- Ebright Azimuth
