= Ocate Peak =

Volcanic peak in New Mexico, US

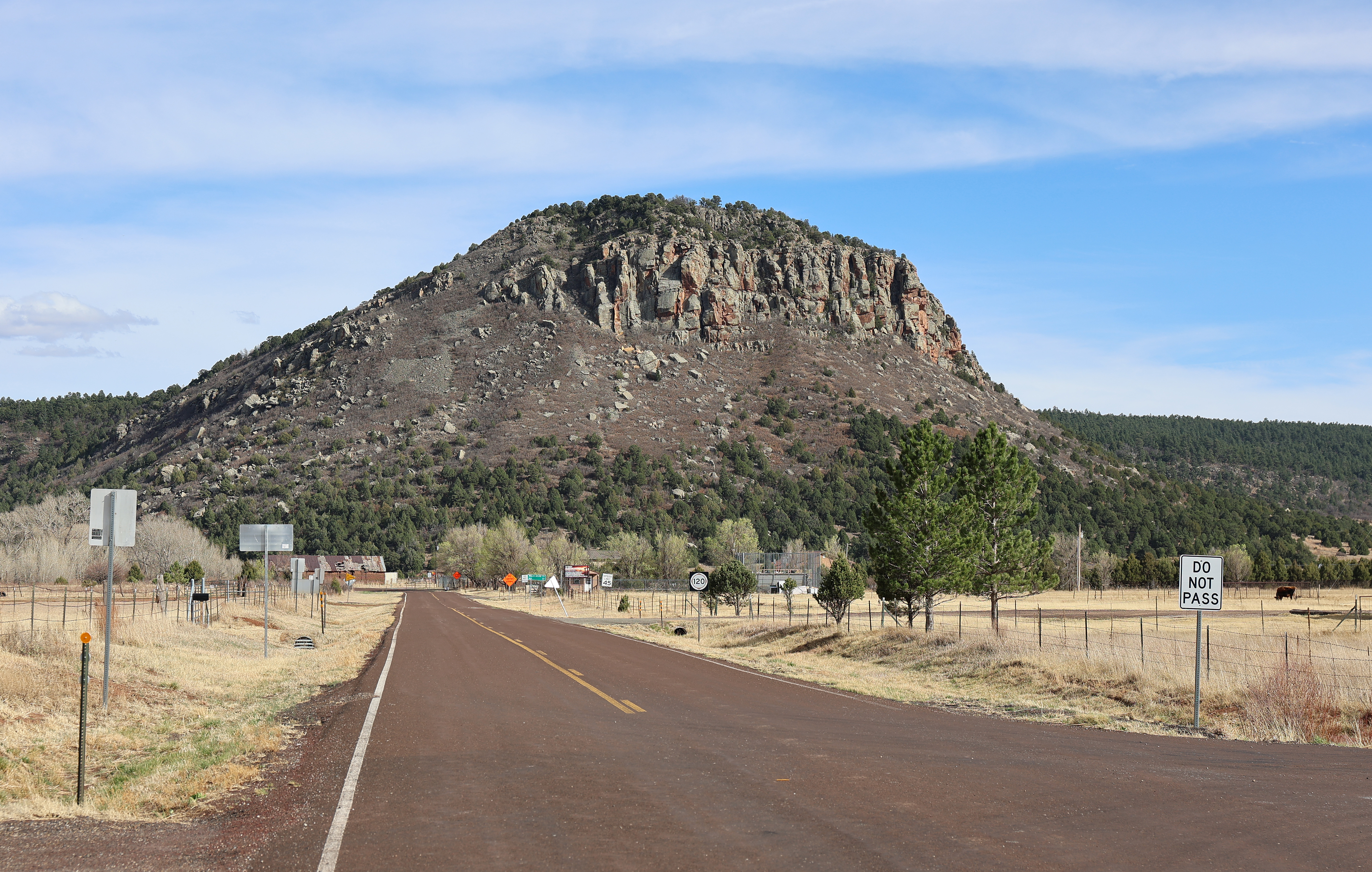
- The peak in 2026

Highest point
- Elevation: 7,788 ft (2,374 m) NGVD 29
- Coordinates: 36°09′56″N 105°02′17″W

Geography
- Location within New Mexico
- Location: Mora County, New Mexico U.S.
- Topo map: USGS Ocate

Ocate Peak or the older name Ocate Crater is a volcano in Mora County, northeastern New Mexico. It was a landmark on the old Santa Fe Trail before the development of the Cimarron Cutoff.

Ocate Peak is located just southeast of the community of Ocate, and State Road 120 passes just north of it. Originally, due to the heightened chance of meeting marauding Indians on the plains, the Santa Fe Trail kept as close to the Sangre de Cristo Mountains as possible, passing through Rayado to the community of Ocate and passing west of Ocate Peak. After Fort Union was established in 1851, the trail took the easier route east of Ocate Peak, but still west of the Turkey Mountains.

Ocote is a Nahuatl word meaning "pine".
