= Ocate volcanic field =

Volcanic field in New Mexico, United States

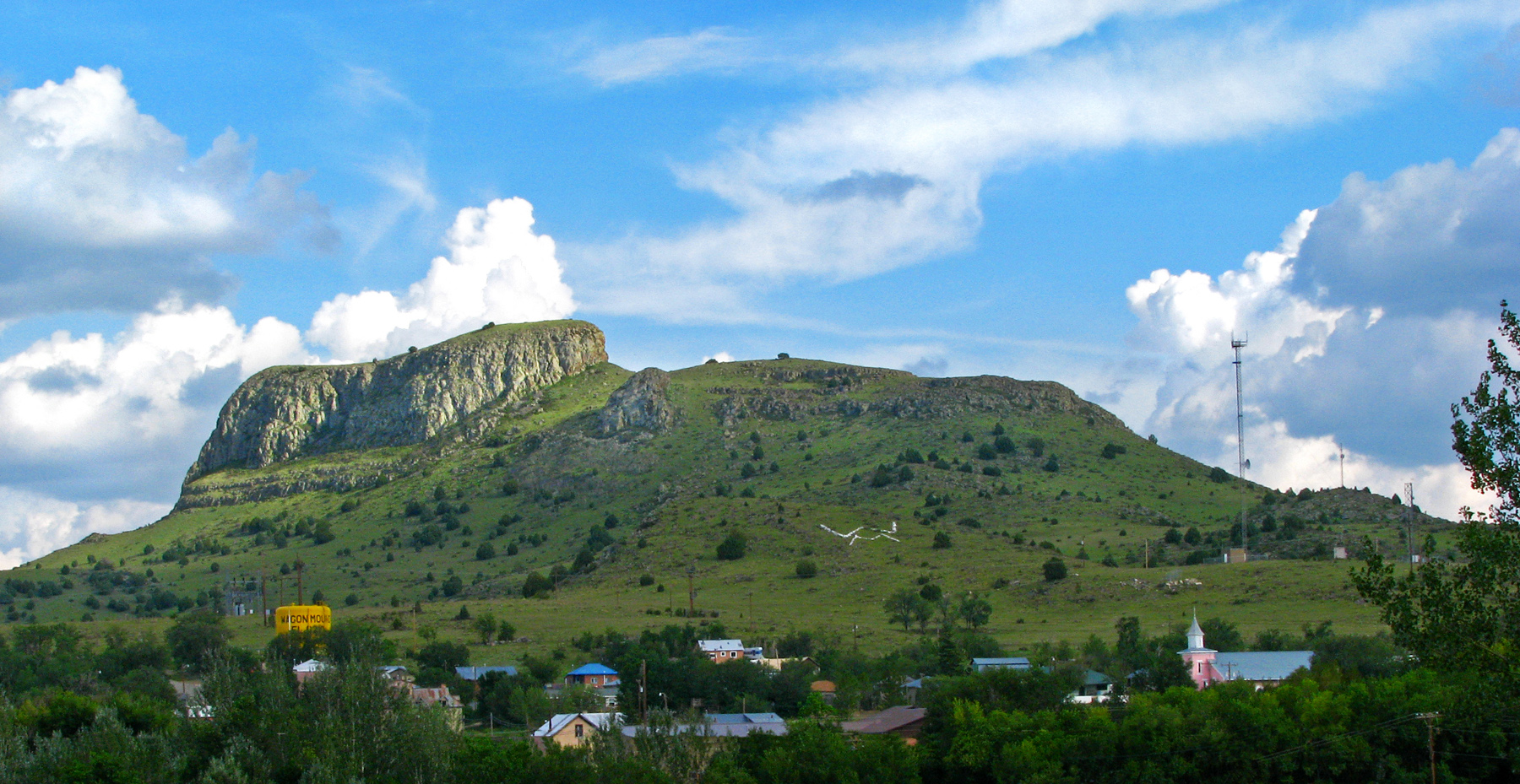
- Wagon Mound, a volcanic neck of the Ocate volcanic field

Highest point
- Elevation: 1,800 to 3,000 meters (5,900 to 9,800 ft)
- Coordinates: 36.12°N 104.75°W

Geography
- Location: Mora County, New Mexico, United States

Geology
- Rock age: 8.3 - 0.8 million years
- Mountain type: Volcanic field

The Ocate volcanic field (also known as the Mora volcanic field) is a monogenetic volcanic field that extends from the southern Cimarron Range of the Sangre de Cristo Mountains to the vicinity of Wagon Mound, New Mexico. The town of Wagon Mound is named after The Wagon Mound, a prominent landmark that is a highly eroded volcanic neck of the volcanic field.

== Description ==
About 8.12 million years ago, basaltic volcanoes began to erupt in the Ocate area. Fourteen eruptive pulses have been identified using Ar-Ar dating, with the most recent taking place around 0.67 to 0.95 Mya.

The lavas erupted in the field are mostly alkali olivine basalt or transitional olivine basalt, with smaller quantities of basaltic andesites, olivine andesites, and dacites. The basaltic lavas were generated from heterogeneous source regions in the mantle, while the more silica-rich andesites and dacites formed from fractional crystallization of basaltic magma and mixing with silica-rich magma from partial melting of crust.

The volcanic field lies along the Jemez Lineament, a zone of young volcanic activity stretching from central Arizona to northeastern New Mexico. The lineament is thought to be a zone of weakness in the lower crust and upper mantle. The vents in the eastern part of the field are aligned roughly east to west, perpendicular to the direction of least compression in the southern Great Plains. Vents in the western part of the field are aligned more randomly, probably because of recent tectonic disturbance of this area.

An unusual feature of the Ocate volcanic field is that the oldest basaltic flows form the highest mesas, and the youngest flows form surfaces lower in elevation. This reverse stratigraphy occurred because after the older flows were erupted about 8.3–5.7 m.y. ago on a relatively flat alluvial plain, the entire area was uplifted, and canyons were cut into the older basalt flows. Younger basalt flows then filled the major stream canyons. When uplift ceased, the youngest basalt flows of the Ocate volcanic field flowed on top of intermediate-aged flows.

== History of investigation ==
During the Wheeler Survey of 1878 to 1879, J.J. Stevenson studied the basalt flows of the Ocate volcanic field, giving the name Ocate Mesa to the main lava-capped mesa that nearly surrounds the town of Ocate, New Mexico. Stevenson also recognized that the basalt-capped mesas south of Ocate Mesa were once continuous with Ocate Mesa prior to erosion. N.H. Darton included the outline of the field in his geologic map of New Mexico in 1928. More detailed mapping took place from the 1950s on. In 1988, J. Michael O'Neill and Harald H. Mehnert carried out the first detailed geologic study of the area and gave it the name of the Ocate volcanic field.

== See also ==
- Coyote Creek State Park
- List of volcanoes in the United States
- List of volcanic fields
