= Narciso Valdez House =

- U.S. National Register of Historic Places
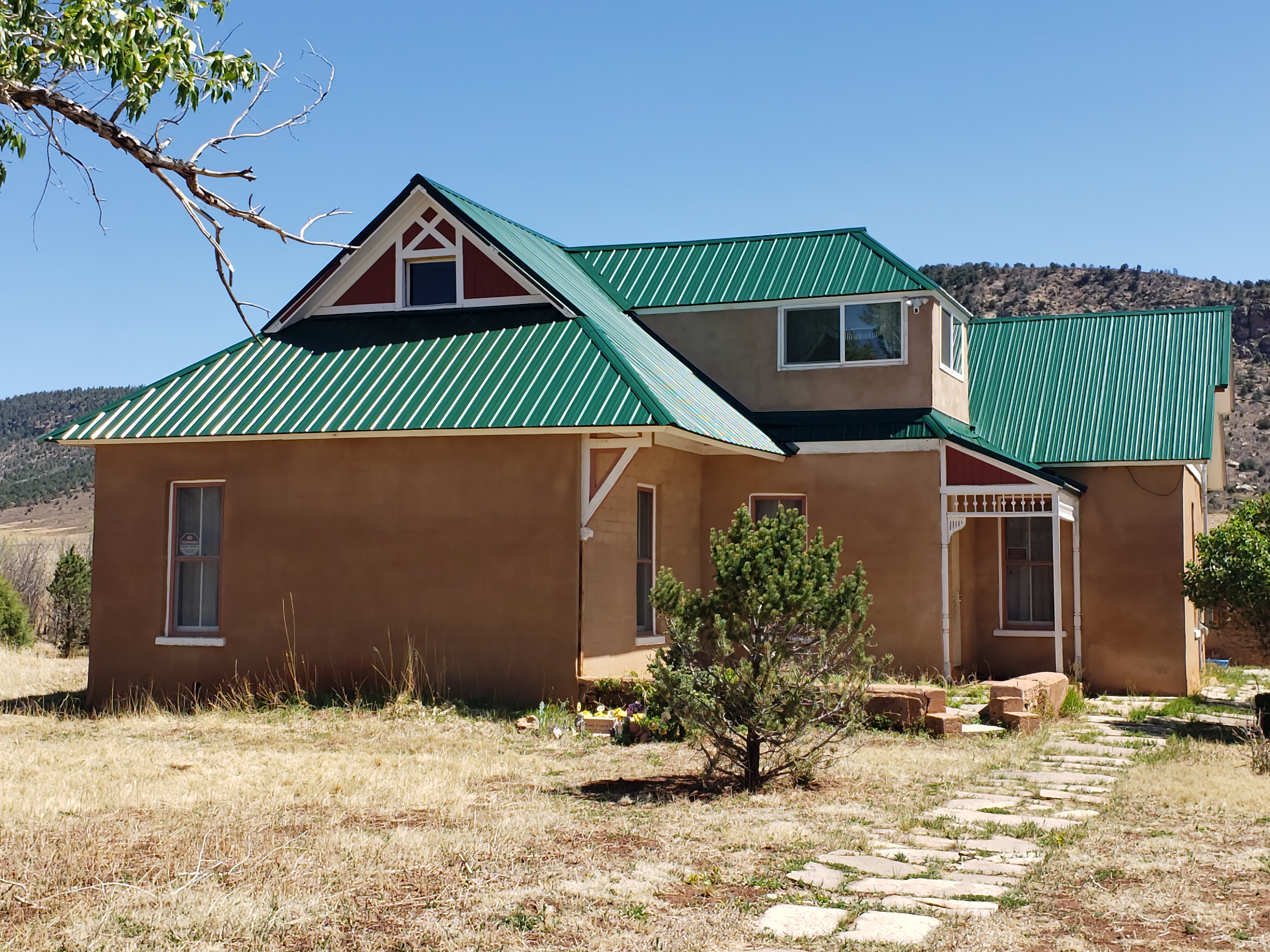

- Location within New Mexico
- Location: NM 120, Ocate, New Mexico
- Coordinates: 36°10′34″N 105°02′55″W
- Area: 0.1 acres (0.040 ha)
- Built: c.1895
- Architectural style: Queen Anne style
- NRHP reference No.: 80004484
- Added to NRHP: July 11, 1980

The Narciso Valdez House, on New Mexico State Road 120 in Ocate, New Mexico, was built between 1895 and 1898. It was listed on the National Register of Historic Places in 1980.

It is a one-and-a-half-story house built of adobe but covered with scored plaster to appear as masonry. It has Queen Anne style in its features, particularly in its interior.

It was deemed "significant because it is one of Ocate's most important structures and because the interior feature of carved and painted moldings is unique. Carved and painted wood is a feature frequently found in New Mexican architecture. The Valdez House, however, is the largest and most elaborate known example."

It is located across from the J.P. Strong Store, which is also National Register-listed.
