= Wagon Mound =

- U.S. National Register of Historic Places
- U.S. National Historic Landmark
- NM State Register of Cultural Properties
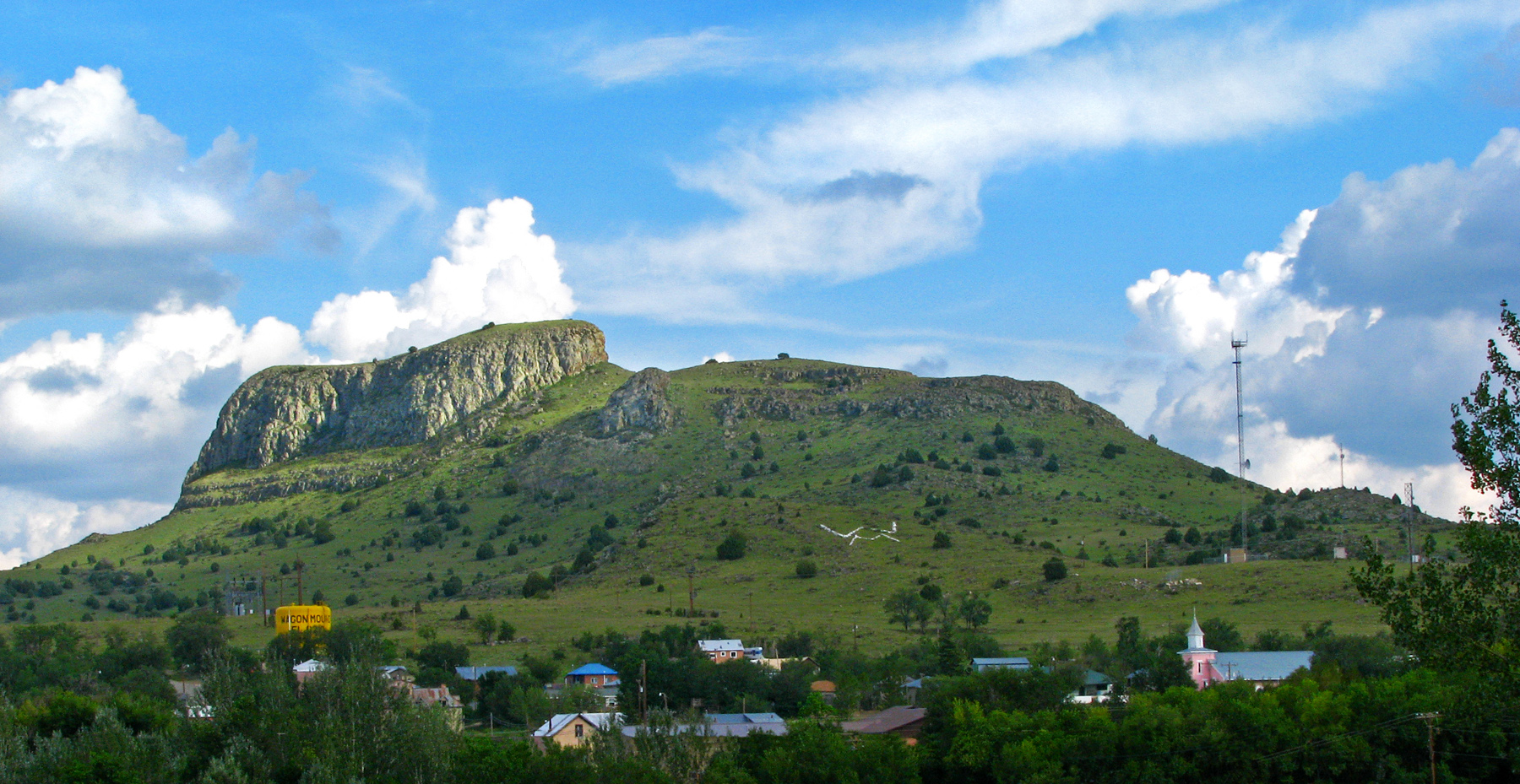

- Location within New Mexico Location within the United States
- Nearest city: Wagon Mound, New Mexico
- Coordinates: 36°0′39″N 104°42′10″W
- Area: 150 acres (61 ha)
- Built: 1868
- NRHP reference No.: 66000478
- NMSRCP No.: 32

Significant dates
- Added to NRHP: October 15, 1966
- Designated NHL: May 23, 1963
- Designated NMSRCP: December 20, 1968

The Wagon Mound is a butte that was a major landmark for pioneers along the Cimarron Cutoff of the Old Santa Fe Trail, a well-known settlement route connecting St. Louis, Missouri and Santa Fe, New Mexico. It is located just east of Wagon Mound, New Mexico, a village named after the butte. The butte is a designated National Historic Landmark, along with Santa Clara Canyon, a site just northwest of the village where travelers on the trail frequently camped and took on water.

== Description and history ==
Wagon Mound is a roughly lozenge-shaped mesa with its highest point at about 6,930 feet (2,110 m). New Mexico State Road 120 runs eastward from the village of Wagon Mound to the north of the mesa, while New Mexico State Road 271 runs southeasterly from the village to its south and west. The village is located directly west of the mesa, with two small mesas, known as the Pilot Knobs, to its west. Wagon Mound is readily visible from the Rabbit Ears, the major landmark further east on the trail.

Wagon Mound was an important landmark on the Cimarron Cutoff branch of the Santa Fe Trail for several reasons. First, it was the last major landmark before reaching Santa Fe, signaling the approaching end of the journey to westbound travelers. Second, the Santa Clara Canyon, located about 2 miles (3.2 km) to the northwest, had a spring that was a reliable source of water in the desert environment. It also served as a cautionary point, because the topography of Santa Clara Canyon made groups camping there vulnerable to attacks by Native Americans protecting their land from these new settlers, with one notably large attack, the Wagon Mound massacre, occurring in 1850. The route was heavily used between about 1822 and the American Civil War. Usage declined with the advent of the railroad (which followed the Santa Fe Trail route in this area) in the 1870s.

== See also ==
- National Register of Historic Places listings in Mora County, New Mexico
- List of National Historic Landmarks in New Mexico
