= New Mexico State Road 434 =

State highway in New Mexico, United States

State Road 434

Route information
- Maintained by NMDOT
- Length: 36.843 mi (59.293 km)

Major junctions
- South end: NM 518 in Mora
- NM 120 in Black Lake
- North end: US 64 in Agua Fria

Location
- Country: United States
- State: New Mexico
- Counties: Colfax, Mora

Highway system
- New Mexico State Highway System; Interstate; US; State; Scenic
← NM 433	→ NM 435

New Mexico State Road 434 (NM 434) is a 36.843-mile-long (59.293 km) state highway in the U.S. state of New Mexico. The route travels through Colfax, and Mora Counties, and through the communities of Angel Fire, Black Lake, Guadalupita and Mora. The southern terminus is at NM 518 in Mora, and the northern terminus is at U.S. Route 64 (US 64) in Angel Fire by the Angel Fire Airport. It includes a dangerous curve that concerns area residents and has prompted a wrongful death suit. Coyote Creek State Park is located on State Road 434 just north of Guadalupita.

== Major intersections ==
County	Location	mi	km	Destinations	Notes
Mora	Mora	0.000	0.000	NM 518	Southern terminus
Colfax	Black Lake	26.109	42.018	NM 120 east	Western terminus of NM 120
Colfax	Angel Fire	36.843	59.293	US 64	Northern terminus
1.000 mi = 1.609 km; 1.000 km = 0.621 mi
