= Guadalupita-Coyote Rural Historic District =

Historic district in New Mexico, United States

- U.S. National Register of Historic Places
- U.S. Historic district
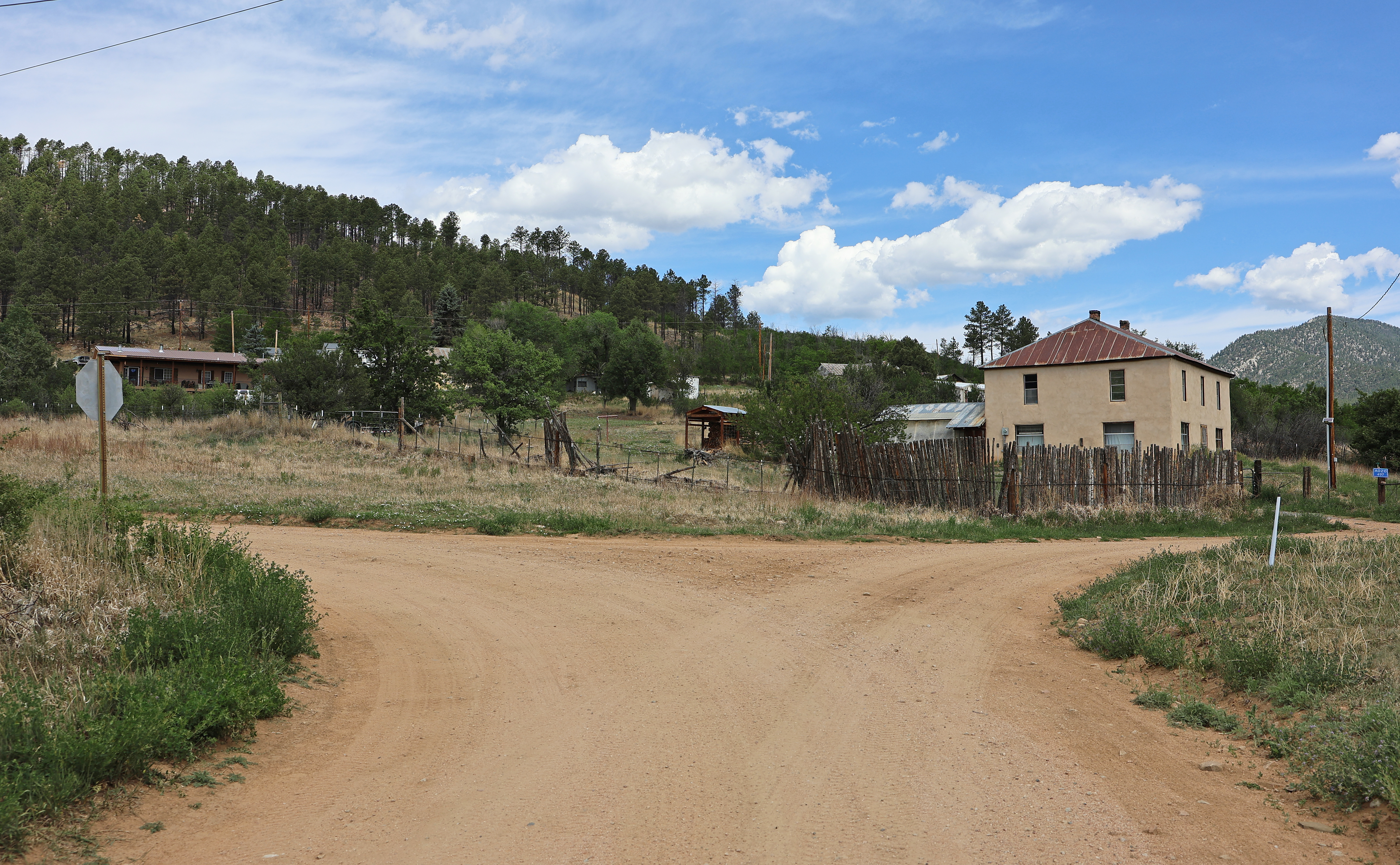
- Guadalupita, New Mexico

- Location within New Mexico
- Nearest city: Watrous, New Mexico
- Coordinates: 36°08′17″N 105°14′17″W
- NRHP reference No.: 100001034
- Added to NRHP: June 5, 2017

The Guadalupita-Coyote Rural Historic District is a historic district in Mora County, New Mexico which was listed on the National Register of Historic Places in 2017.

It includes the village of Guadalupita, parts of Guadalupita and Williams canyons, and the Coyote Creek valley between Guadalupita and Lucero.

The Guadalupita/Coyote Historic District was listed on New Mexico's Register of Cultural Properties in 2011. Ownership of a historic church property in Guadalupita was in dispute in 2017.
