= La Cueva, Mora County, New Mexico =

Unincorporated community in New Mexico, US

La Cueva, New Mexico
- Unincorporated community
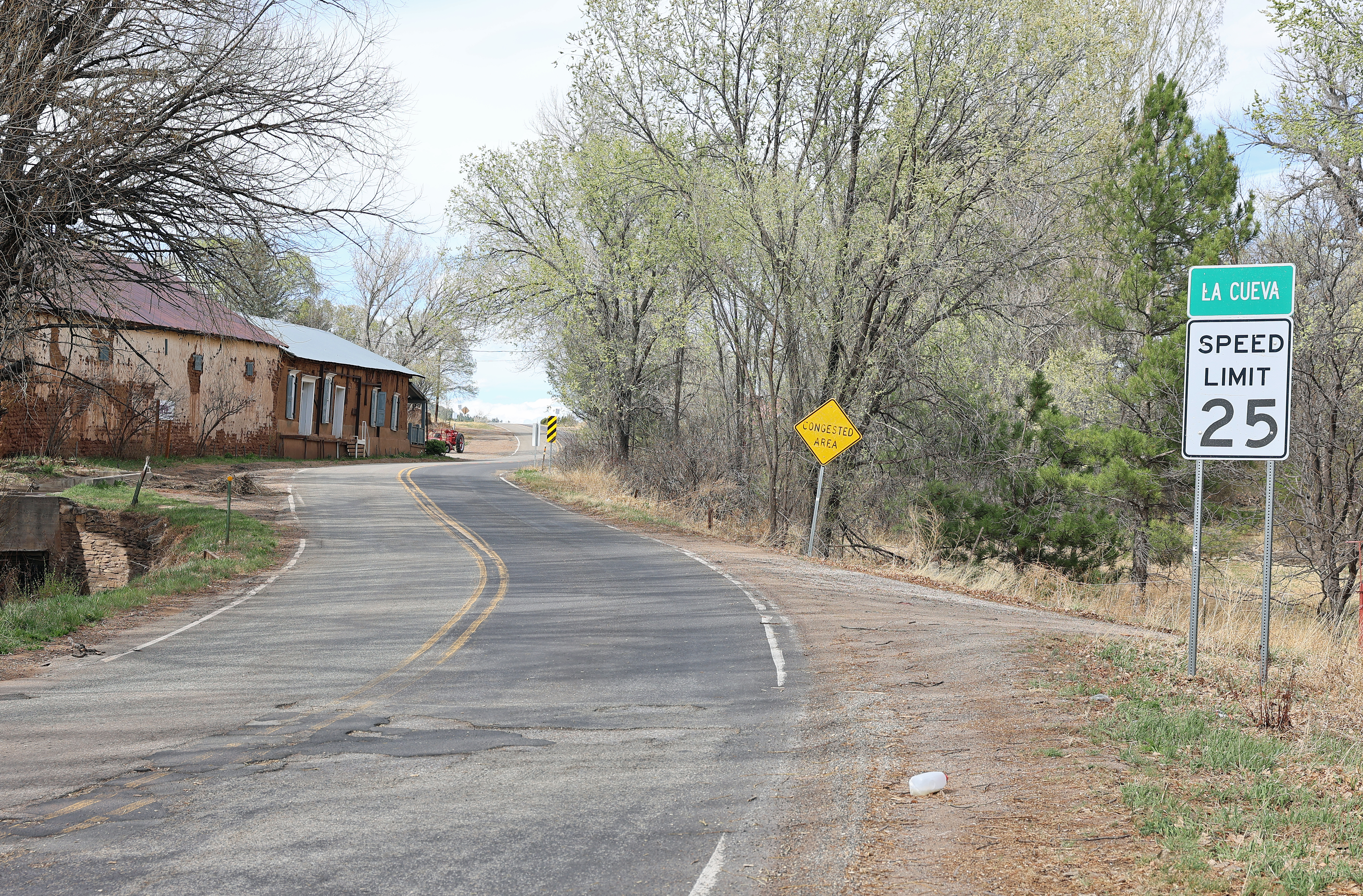
- La Cueva in 2026

- Location in New Mexico La Cueva (the United States)
- Country: United States
- State: New Mexico
- County: Mora
- Established: 1851
- Founder: Vicente Romero

Area
  - Total: 0.73 sq mi (1.9 km^{2})

La Cueva is an unincorporated community on the Mora River in Mora County, New Mexico, United States, situated at the intersection of New Mexico State Roads 442 and 518.

== History ==
It was established in 1851 by Vicente Romero who found the nearby location of Fort Union provided both protection from the Apache and a market for his crops. Legend has it that he named the village La Cueva because he lived in a nearby cave (Sp.: la cueva) while he was building his ranch house. He and his neighbors prospered and he built a grist mill in the early 1860s. La Cueva had a post office from 1868 until 1961. The La Cueva Historic District became a United States registered historical district in 1973 and preserves 470 acres (1.9 km^{2}). It includes the mill, the original San Rafael Church, a mercantile (store), the 1851 Romero ranch house, as well as other parts of the Romero ranch and village center.

David Salman purchased the former La Cueva Ranch in Mora County, which he revitalized by producing farm products, particularly raspberries. He was president of the Salman Ranch from 1960 to 2002. Salman was later a New Mexico House Representative. In April 1980 there was controversy over a proposed music and ecology festival to be held on the 36,000 acres (15,000 ha) ranch, expected to attract up to 300,000 people.

La Cueva Lake is 1 mile (1.6 km) east of the village.
