= New Mexico State Road 271 =

State highway in New Mexico, United States

State Road 271
- NM 271 highlighted in red

Route information
- Maintained by NMDOT
- Length: 24.1 mi (38.8 km)

Major junctions
- South end: Mora/ San Miguel County line
- North end: NM 120 in Wagon Mound

Location
- Country: United States
- State: New Mexico
- Counties: Mora

Highway system
- New Mexico State Highway System; Interstate; US; State; Scenic
← NM 270	→ NM 272

State Road 271 (NM 271) is a 24.1-mile-long (38.8 km) state highway in the US state of New Mexico. NM 271's southern terminus is at the end of state maintenance at the Mora/ San Miguel County line, and the northern terminus is at NM 120 in Wagon Mound.

== Major intersections ==
The entire route is in Mora County.

Location	mi	km	Destinations	Notes
Wagon Mound	0.000	0.000	NM 120	Northern terminus
	24.100	38.785	End of state maintenance	Southern terminus, continues south at the Mora/ San Miguel County line
1.000 mi = 1.609 km; 1.000 km = 0.621 mi
