= New Mexico State Road 94 =

State highway in New Mexico, United States

State Road 94

Route information
- Maintained by NMDOT
- Length: 18.630 mi (29.982 km)

Major junctions
- South end: NM 518 in Sapello
- North end: NM 518 in Mora

Location
- Country: United States
- State: New Mexico
- Counties: San Miguel, Mora

Highway system
- New Mexico State Highway System; Interstate; US; State; Scenic
← NM 93	→ NM 95

State Road 94 (NM 94) is a state highway in the US state of New Mexico. Its total length is approximately 18.6 miles (29.9 km). NM 94's southern terminus is at NM 518 in Sapello, and the northern terminus is in Mora at NM 518.

== Major intersections ==
County	Location	mi	km	Destinations	Notes
San Miguel	Sapello	0.000	0.000	NM 518	Southern terminus
San Miguel	Sapello	0.700	1.127	NM 266 west	Eastern terminus of NM 266
Mora	Mora	18.630	29.982	NM 518	Northern terminus
1.000 mi = 1.609 km; 1.000 km = 0.621 mi
