= Coyote Creek State Park =

New Mexico state park

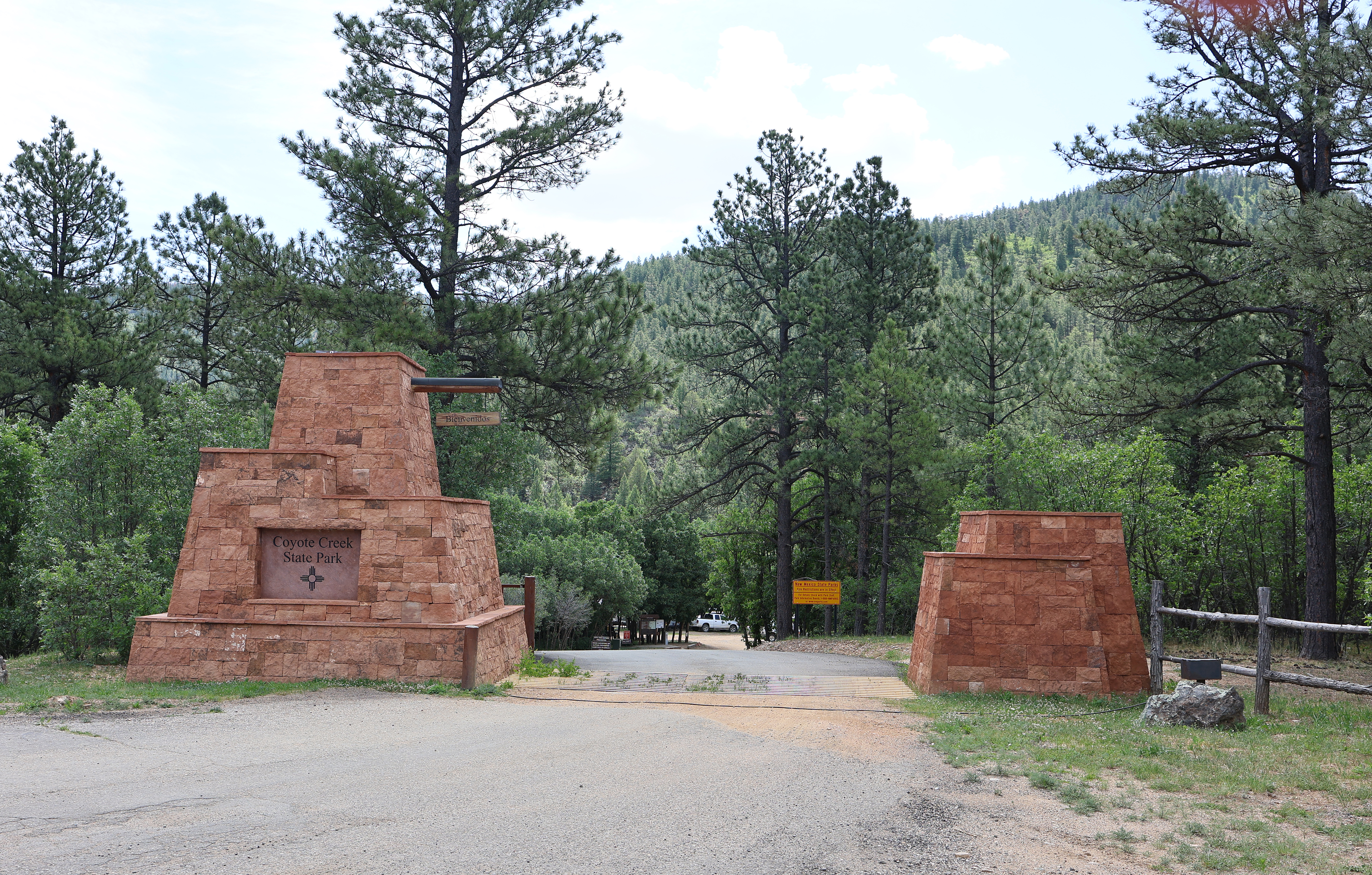
- The park entrance (2026)

- Location within New Mexico
- Interactive map of Coyote Creek State Park
- Location: Mora County, New Mexico, United States
- Coordinates: 36°10′28″N 105°14′00″W
- Area: 462 acres (187 ha)
- Elevation: 7,667 ft (2,337 m)
- Established: 1969
- Administrator: New Mexico Energy, Minerals and Natural Resources Department
- Website: Official website

Coyote Creek State Park is a state park of New Mexico, United States, preserving a riparian canyon in the Sangre de Cristo Mountains. The park is located 17 miles (27 km) north of Mora.

== Geography ==
Coyote Creek, a tributary of the Mora River, flows almost due south through Guadalupita Canyon. A ridge called La Mesa rises to 9,112 feet (2,777 m) in elevation above the park to the east, and to the west is the Rincon subrange of the Sangre de Cristo Mountains. The park is located in the eastern foothills of the Sangre de Cristo Mountains at an altitude of 7,700 feet (2,300 m). There is an average precipitation of 18 inches (46 cm) per year and an average annual temperature of 46 °F (8 °C). Summer temperatures reaching 90 °F (32 °C) are unusual, though winters are severe with subzero temperatures and heavy snow. The average annual flow of Coyote Creek is about 10,000 acre-feet (12,000,000 m^{3}).

== Geology ==
The oldest rocks visible in Coyote Creek State Park were deposited during the Late Pennsylvanian and Early Permian between 320 and 250 million years ago. In a geosyncline at the edge of a great shallow sea, limestone formed underwater is intermixed with sandstone and shale eroded from mountains to the west. The sea retreated and advanced several times and the mountains eventually eroded away. 70 million years ago the Laramide orogeny uplifted the Sangre de Cristo Mountains, steeply tilting the earlier sediments down to the east. New mountain sediments formed a vast alluvial plain. 8 million years ago a series of volcanic eruptions took place to the east, forming the Ocate volcanic field. The top of the basalt flows was 1,000 feet (300 m) higher than the bottom of Guadalupita Canyon is today. Canyons gradually carved into the lava flows were inundated with more basalt by later eruptions, creating a reverse stratigraphy where newer deposits are below older deposits. Guadalupita Canyon was carved during the Pleistocene epoch when there were small glaciers in the mountains to the west. The creekbed initially shifted eastward following the eroding edge of the basalt. Upon hitting the softer Pennsylvanian sediments, however, the creek began carving downward, creating a valley with a steep east wall and a more gradual slope to the west.

== Flora and fauna ==
The riparian zone along the creek is dominated by coyote willow with some narrowleaf cottonwood and chokecherry intermixed. East of the creek are wet meadows followed by a ponderosa pine forest with an understory of Gambel oak. On the west side of the park is a conifer forest of Douglas fir, limber pine, blue spruce, Engelmann spruce, bristlecone pine, white fir, and quaking aspen, again with a Gambel oak understory. Species diversity is lower at the north and south ends of the park. Coyote Creek State Park is known for its wildflowers, such as geraniums, sunflowers, irises, and primroses.

Mammals known to inhabit the immediate area include black bears, cougars, elk, mule deer, red and gray foxes, bobcats, coyotes, skunks, and porcupines. Beavers have created small pools along the creek with their dams. These ponds have benefited the game fish, which include rainbow trout, brown trout, Rio Grande cutthroat trout, and white suckers. Numerous bird species have been identified in the park, and the endangered southwestern subspecies of the willow flycatcher nests and breeds along Coyote Creek.

== History ==
The Coyote Creek area was inhabited by Native Americans for centuries, although no significant archaeological sites have been found within the park. Settlement by Euro-Americans began in 1837 when three residents of Taos received a community land grant from the Mexican government. The Coyote Creek valley was farmed and many sections were held as community property. With the annexation of New Mexico by the United States in 1846, the grant only narrowly succeeded in being honored. However Stephen Benton Elkins and Thomas B. Catron began buying up community lands, so in defense the residents of Guadalupita divided up and privatized the remaining common parcels in 1889.

In the early 1930s many of the parcels were consolidated into a ranch owned by Eusebio Romero. A ranch house and the remains of a moonshine shack from this era are still visible in the park. In the late 1960s, as a new owner bought up the ranch, 80 acres (32 ha) surveyed as prime state park material were set aside. This property was purchased by the state on April 24, 1969, for $16,000. The park maintains an official arrangement with an acequia of landowners downstream. Coyote Creek State Park was greatly expanded in size in 2004 with the purchase and donation of 382 acres (155 ha) by The Trust for Public Land.

== Recreation ==
Coyote Creek State Park is open year-round, with most visitors coming to fish, hike, camp, and picnic. A 2-mile (3.2 km) trail circles through the park, crossing the creek twice. Coyote Creek is the most densely stocked trout stream in New Mexico.
