= New Mexico State Road 120 =

State highway in New Mexico, United States

State Road 120
- NM 120 highlighted in red

Route information
- Maintained by NMDOT
- Length: 119.031 mi (191.562 km)

Major junctions
- West end: NM 434 in Black Lake
- NM 442 in Ocate; I-25 in Wagon Mound; NM 271 in Wagon Mound; NM 39 in Roy
- East end: US 56 / US 412 toward Clayton

Location
- Country: United States
- State: New Mexico
- Counties: Colfax, Mora, Harding, Union

Highway system
- New Mexico State Highway System; Interstate; US; State; Scenic
← NM 119	→ NM 121

State Road 120 (NM 120) is a 119.031-mile-long (191.562 km) state road in the U.S. state of New Mexico. The route traverses four counties: Colfax, Mora, Harding, and Union, and is the longest state road in New Mexico. The highway's only grade-separated interchange is with Interstate 25 (I-25) in Wagon Mound.

== Route description ==
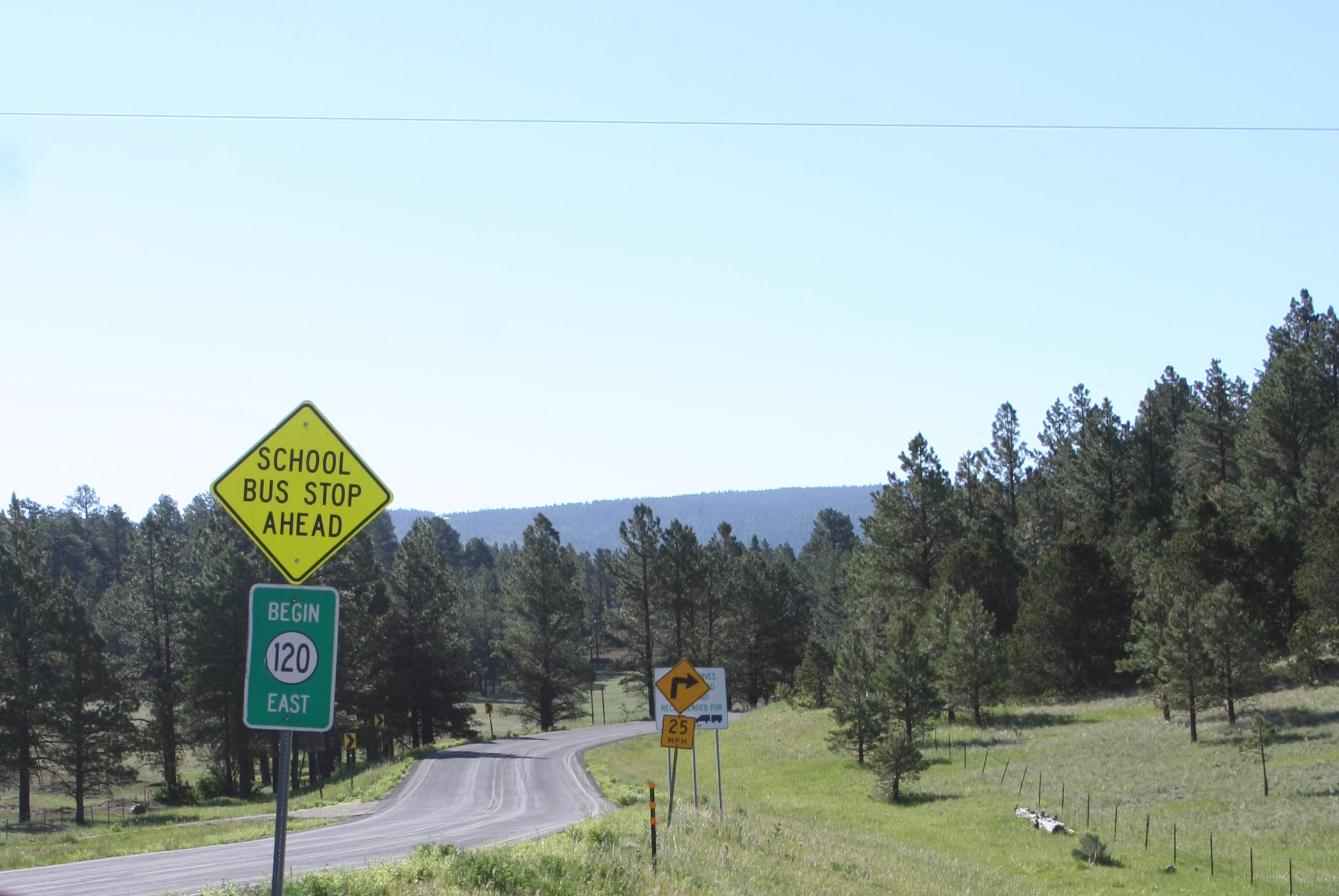
Near the route's western terminus, looking east

Starting as paved road in the far southwestern corner of Colfax County in the community of Black Lake at the intersection with Route 434, New Mexico State Road 120 changes into an unpaved road just before mile marker 3. It travels east around the northern edge of Ocate Mesa and then heads southeast down Manueles Canyon on the northeastern side of Ocate Mesa. Due east of the top of Ocate Mesa it enters Mora County and heads south-southeast. Passing the south end of Ocate Mesa, the road heads southeast and at mile marker 12 the surface becomes paved again. In winter, this unpaved section is prone to heavy ice, snowpack, and mud.

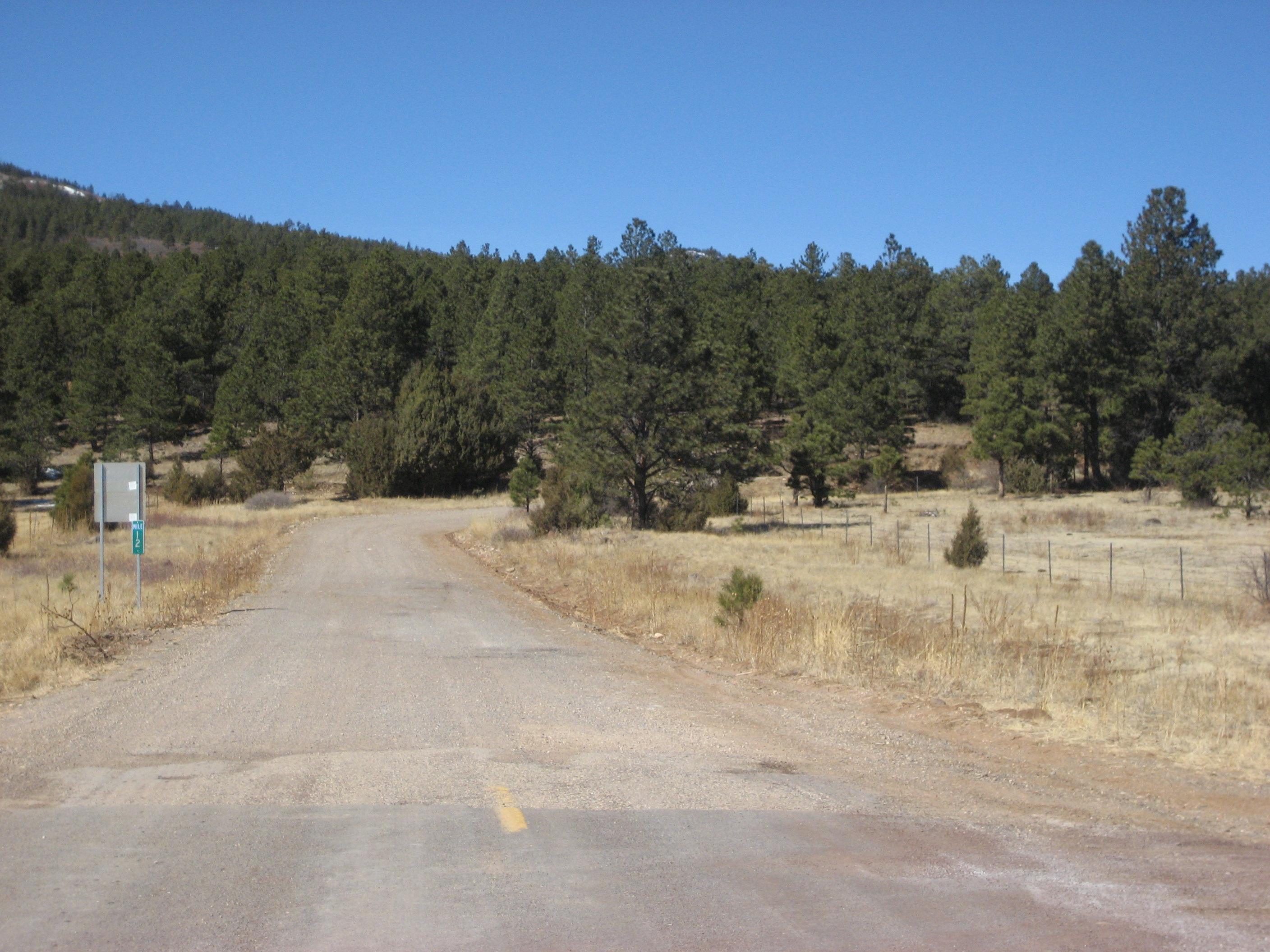
Near mile 12 where dirt meets asphalt

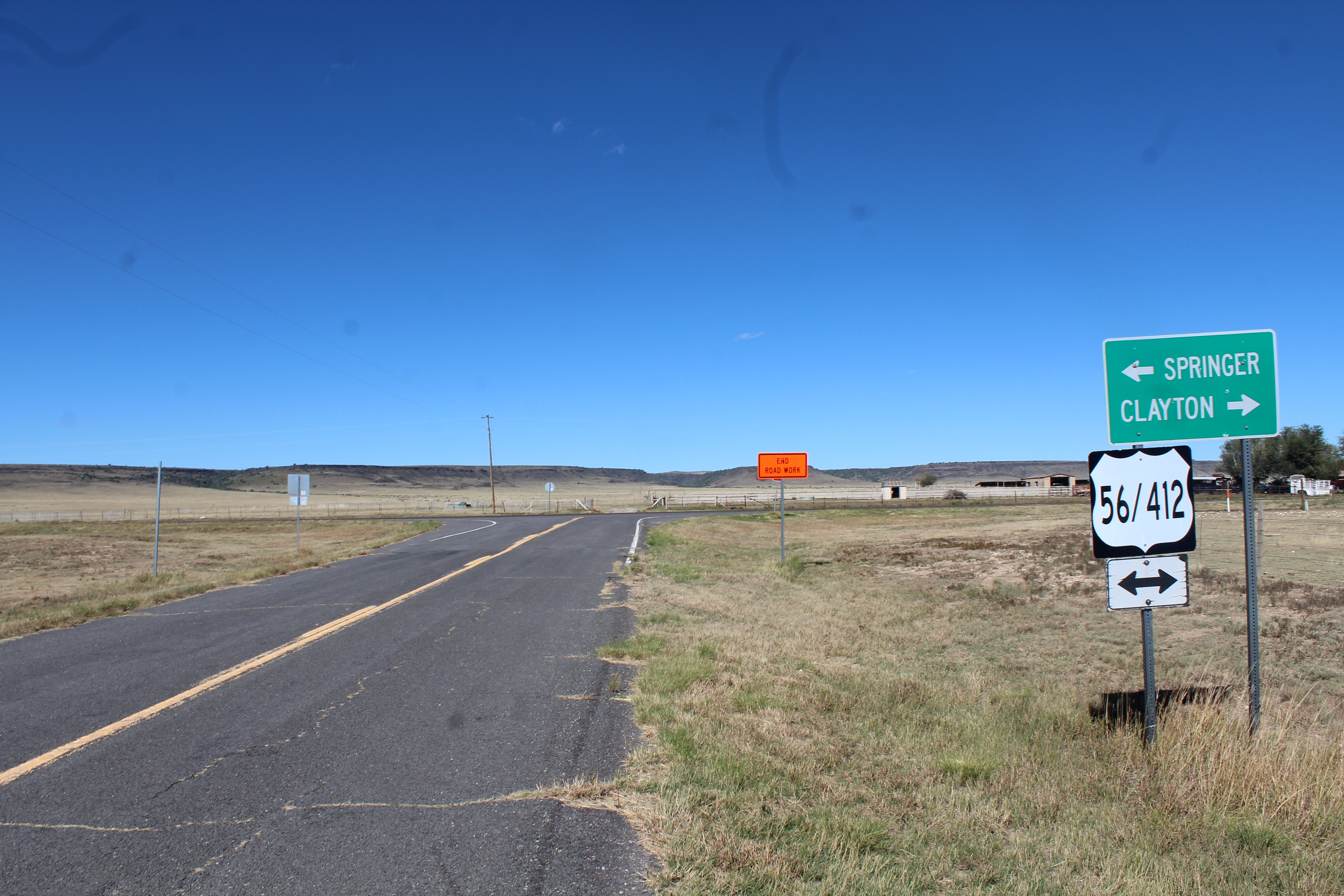
The eastern terminus of State Road 120 at US Route 56 & 412

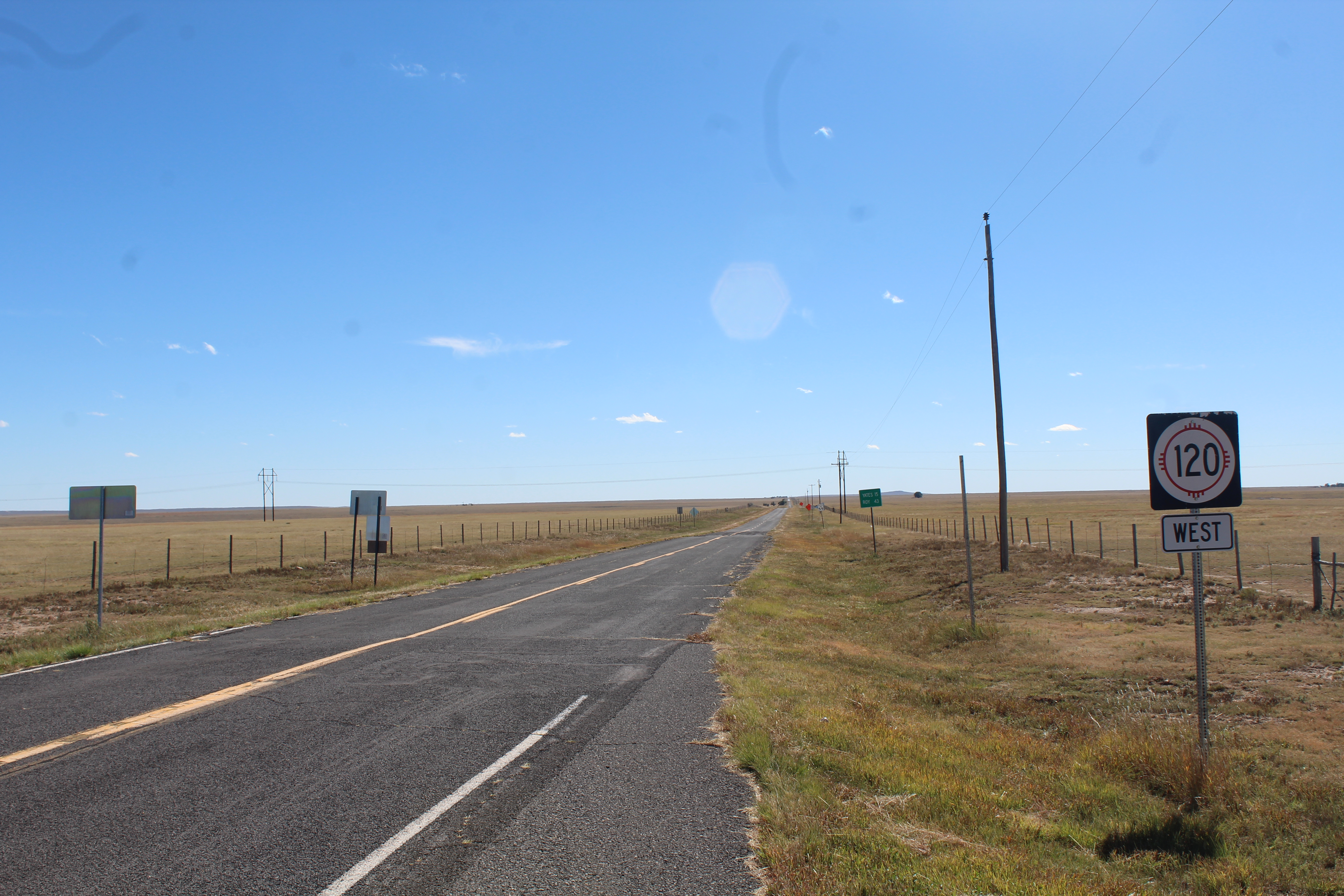
State Road 120 Westbound from its eastern terminus with US 56 & 412

After mile marker 12, the road continues southeastward passing the unpaved Los Le Febres turnoff on the right (to the west). At this point Manueles Creek on the left side of the road is joined by Wheaton Creek to form Ocate Creek, and the road follows Ocate Creek southeast with the Maxwell Land Grant on the left (NE) and the Mora Land Grant on the right (SW). The road then enters the community of Ocate where it intersects with Route 442. Leaving Ocate again alongside Ocate Creek, the road heads east twisting through the foothills of Los Naranjos Peak to the south in the Ocate Creek water gap into the community of Naranjos. From Naranjos the road leaves the Ocate Creek bed and heads almost straight southeast, passing numerous ranch roads, for 19 miles (31 km) to the town of Wagon Mound. Ten miles (16 km) out of Naranjos, the road passes the 7,000 feet (2,100 m) in elevation, La Chata Crater, on the left (NE). Just before the town the road turns east and still on the west side of Wagon Mound, it has its only interchange at its intersection with I-25 (exit 387). The road then crosses the intercontinental railroad tracks of the BNSF Railway. Within Wagon Mound the road heads east and is called Park Avenue. Leaving Wagon Mound, the road again passes numerous ranch roads heading east, past Los Mesas del Conjelon on the right (south), for about 12 miles (19 km) and then heading southeast another 12 miles (19 km) to its intersection with the Canadian River at mile post 64. The bridge over the river is 4,150 feet (1,260 m) long.

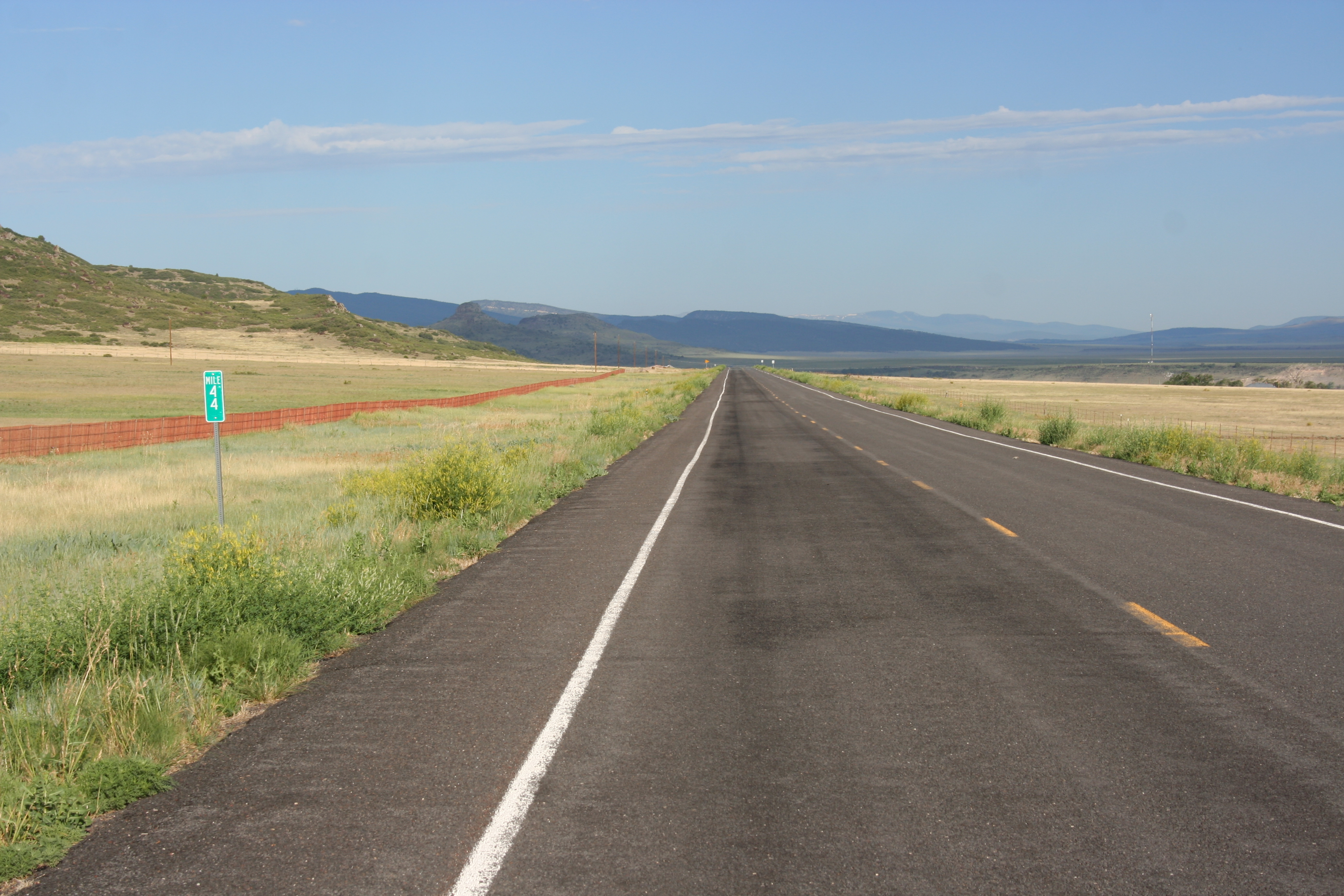
Near mile 44 toward Wagon Mound

Crossing the Canadian River bridge the road enters Harding County and then heads north-northeast about 8 miles (13 km) into the town of Roy. The road comes into Roy as the Wagon Mound Highway, then zags up to Second Street and then up to Third Street where it intersects with Route 39. Then heading three blocks east as Third Street, the road turns due north as Floersheim Street and leaves Roy as the Yates Highway. Running along section lines the road heads north and east intermittently, passing numerous ranch roads and going through part of the Kiowa National Grassland which is predominately north of the road, for 27 miles (43 km) to the community of Yates. Four miles (6.4 km) later heading due north the road passes into Union County. After 12 miles (19 km) in Union County headed mostly north, but still on section lines, the road terminates at its intersection with U.S. Route 56 and U.S. Route 412 8 miles (13 km) east of Gladstone. A dirt road continues north at that point for a couple of miles into the Don Carlos Hills.

== Major intersections ==
County	Location	mi	km	Destinations	Notes
Colfax	Black Lake	0.000	0.000	NM 434 – Mora, Eagle Nest	Western terminus
Mora	Ocate	17.110	27.536	NM 442 south – Buena Vista	Northern terminus of NM 442
Mora	Wagon Mound	40.275	64.816	I-25 (US 85) – Santa Fe, Denver	I-10 Exit 387
Mora	Wagon Mound	40.385	64.993	Frontage Road 2151 (FR 2151)	
Mora	Wagon Mound	40.464	65.120	NM 271 south (Railroad Avenue) – Alamito	Northern terminus of NM 271
Harding	Roy	73.937	118.990	NM 39 (Richelieu Street) – Logan, Abbott	
Union		119.031	191.562	US 56 / US 412 – Springer, Clayton	Eastern terminus
1.000 mi = 1.609 km; 1.000 km = 0.621 mi

== See also ==
- List of state roads in New Mexico
