= Sapello, New Mexico =

Unincorporated community in New Mexico, United States

Sapello
- Unincorporated community
- Location within the state of New Mexico Sapello (the United States)
- Coordinates: 35°46′22″N 105°15′12″W
- Country: United States
- State: New Mexico
- County: San Miguel
- Elevation: 6,969 ft (2,124 m)
- Time zone: UTC-7 (Mountain (MST))
  - Summer (DST): UTC-6 (MDT)
- ZIP codes: 87745
- Area code: 505
- GNIS feature ID: 910814

Sapello is an unincorporated community located in San Miguel County, New Mexico, United States. The community is located at the junction of state roads 94 and 518, 12.5 miles (20.1 km) north of Las Vegas. Sapello was a trading post along the Santa Fe Trail.

Sapello is a popular site for astronomers, as it has little light pollution at night. The minor planet 143641 Sapello was named for the community.
