= Buena Vista, New Mexico =

- Unincorporated community
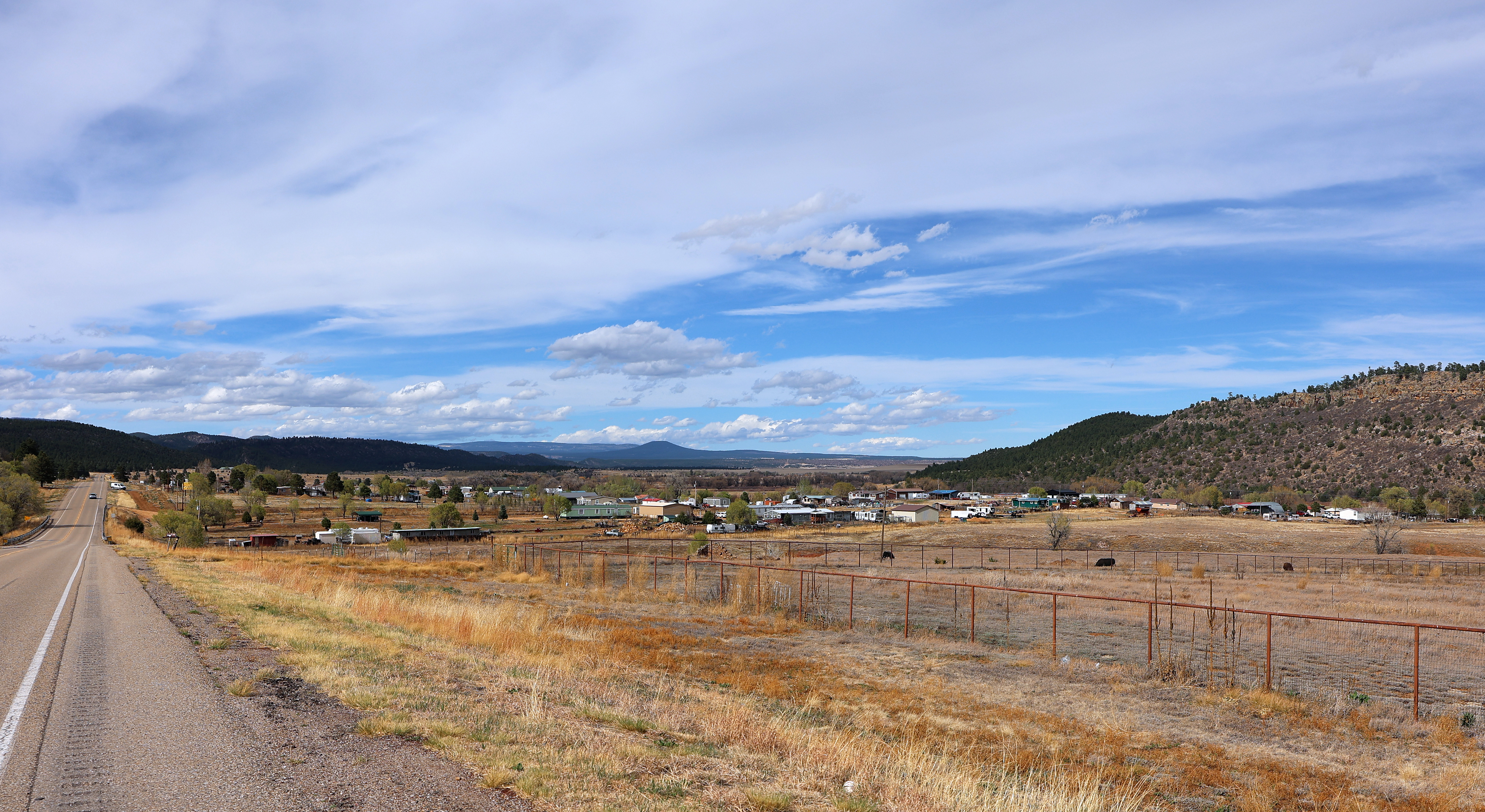
- Buena Vista (2026)

- Location within New Mexico Location within the United States
- Coordinates: 35°54′49″N 105°14′57″W
- Country: United States
- State: New Mexico
- County: Mora
- Elevation: 6,988 ft (2,130 m)
- Time zone: UTC-7 (Mountain (MST))
  - Summer (DST): UTC-6 (MDT)
- ZIP codes: 87712
- Area code: 575
- GNIS feature ID: 899555

Buena Vista is an unincorporated community in Mora County, New Mexico, United States. It is located along New Mexico State Road 518, approximately 6.2 miles (10.0 km) southeast of Mora. The community has its own post office with ZIP code 87712.
