= Malcolm Ebright =

American author, lawyer, and activist

- Born: 21 April 1932; California
- Died: 12 June 2025 (aged 93); Guadalupita, New Mexico, United States
- Occupations: Author, actvist, historian of land grants

Malcoln Ebright (1932-2025) was an author, historian, activist, and attorney in New Mexico from 1970 until his death. He was the "founder of the Center for Land Grant Studies, a non-profit organization devoted to research, education, and the distribution of books and other materials about the Southwest" with an emphasis on land and water rights issues of traditional communities in New Mexico. He was the co-editor of an online newspaper, La Jicarita News, which explored environmental politics in New Mexico. Author William deBuys said, "Malcolm Ebright, quite simply, is the finest land grants scholar we've ever had."

The annexation of New Mexico and southern Colorado by the United States in 1848 resulted in a new and fundamentally different system of land tenure. Attempts to integrate Spanish and Mexican land ownership and tenure systems with U.S. practices and laws caused controversies about land ownership and public access to land which have continued into the 21st century. Land grants continue to be a fact of life and controversy in the region.

Ebright relocated to New Mexico from California in 1970. He was hired by the New Mexico Planning Office to study land grant history in the wake of violent disputes about ownership of lands in the Tierra Amarilla Land Grant. He lived in New Mexico for the rest of his life, publishing eight books and numerous journal articles on land grant issues. His research required study of Spanish and Mexican documents in archives dating to the 18th and 19th centuries. He developed a database of the 295 Spanish and Mexican land grants in New Mexico and southern Colorado. They totalled in area tens of thousands of square miles.

Ebright became an advocate for the historic land rights of the Hispanic and Native Americans (Indians) of New Mexico. In 2007, he wrote an article in La Jicarita News deploring the displacement of Hispanic settlers and the loss of their lands because of the Manhattan Project of World War II. In another instance, he helped the people of Picuris Pueblo prevent the establishment of a copper mine on lands they claimed. He helped other Pueblo peoples regain ownership of lands they had once possessed. He used his knowledge of 18th century land grants to prevail in legal cases in land grant issues.

== Books ==
- The Tierra Amarilla Grant: A History of Chicanery (1980)
- Spanish and Mexican Land Grants and the Law (1989)
- Land Grants and Lawsuits in Northern New Mexico (New Mexico Land Grant) (1996)
- The Witches of Abiquiu: The Governor, the Priest, the Genizaro Indians, and the Devil (with Rick Hendricks et.al.) (2006)
- Advocates for the Oppressed: Hispanos, Indians, Genizaros, and their Land in New Mexico (2014)
- Four Square Leagues: Pueblo Indian Land in New Mexico (with Rick Hendricks} (2015)
- Pueblo Sovereignty: Indian Land and Water in New Mexico and Texas (2022)
- Pablo Abeita: The Life and Times of a Native Statesman of Isleta Pueblo, 1871-1940 (with Rick Hendricks) (2023)

== See also ==
- Land grants in New Mexico and Colorado
- Santa Fe Ring
