= New Mexico State Road 442 =

State highway in New Mexico, United States

State Road 442

Route information
- Maintained by NMDOT
- Length: 21.375 mi (34.400 km)

Major junctions
- Southern end: NM 518 in La Cueva
- Northern end: NM 120 in Ocate

Location
- Country: United States
- State: New Mexico
- Counties: Mora

Highway system
- New Mexico State Highway System; Interstate; US; State; Scenic
← NM 441	→ NM 443

State Road 442 (NM 442) is a 21.375-mile-long (34.400 km) state highway in the US state of New Mexico. NM 442's southern terminus is at NM 518 in La Cueva, and the northern terminus is at NM 120 in Ocate. The J.P. Strong Store is located at that terminus.

== Major intersections ==
The entire route is in Mora County.

Location	mi	km	Destinations	Notes
La Cueva	0.000	0.000	NM 518	Southern terminus
Ocate	21.375	34.400	NM 120	Northern terminus
1.000 mi = 1.609 km; 1.000 km = 0.621 mi
