= Ocate, New Mexico =

- Unincorporated community
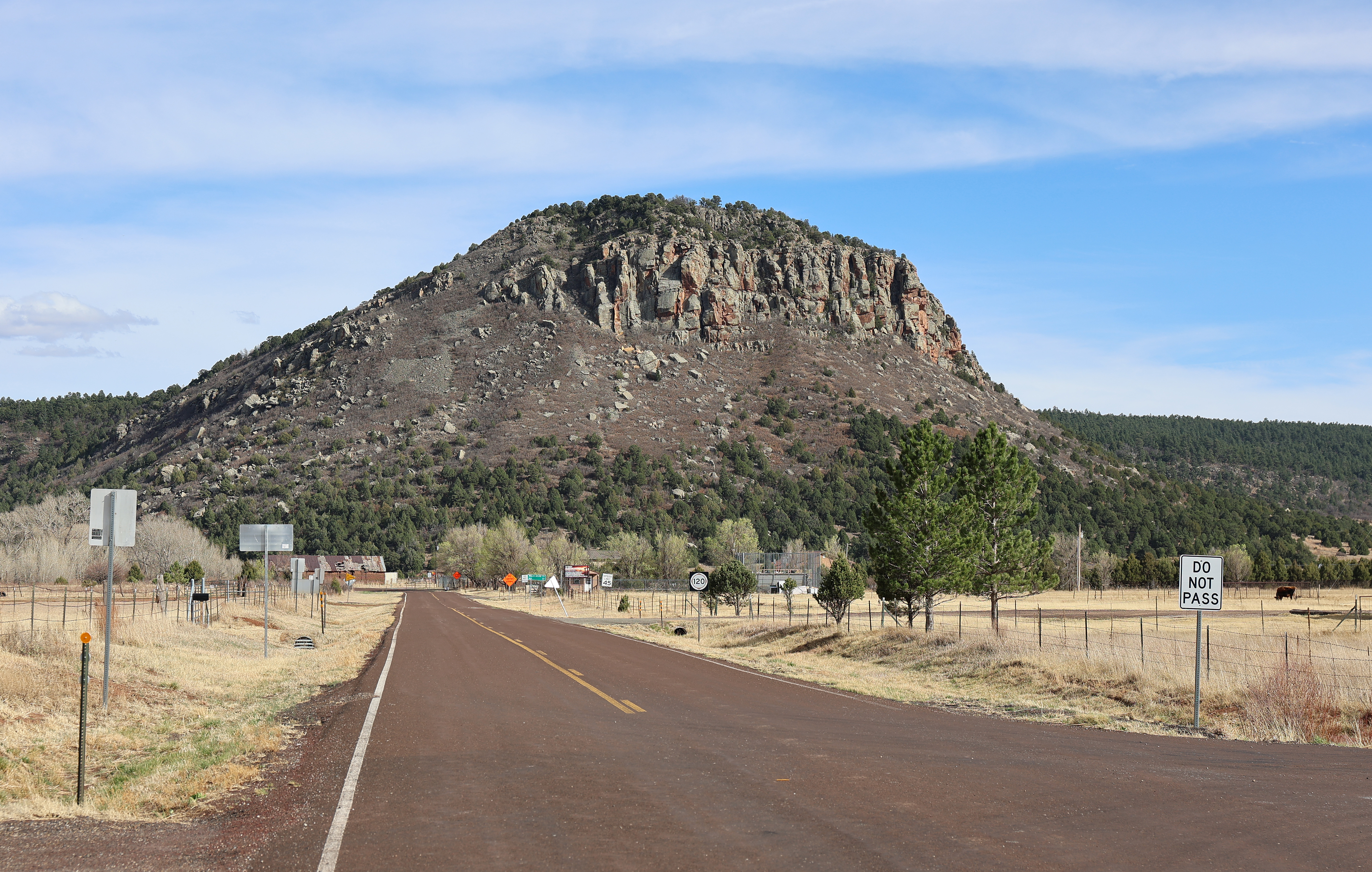
- Ocate Peak overlooks the community of Ocate

- Location within New Mexico Location within the United States
- Coordinates: 36°10′32″N 105°02′53″W
- Country: United States
- State: New Mexico
- County: Mora
- Elevation: 7,208 ft (2,197 m)
- Time zone: UTC-7 (Mountain (MST))
  - Summer (DST): UTC-6 (MDT)
- ZIP codes: 87734
- Area code: 575
- GNIS feature ID: 899816

Ocate is an unincorporated community located in Mora County, New Mexico, United States. The community is located at the junction of State Routes 442 and 120, 22.3 miles (35.9 km) west-northwest of Wagon Mound. Ocate has a post office with ZIP code 87734, which opened on January 10, 1870.

It is the location of the J. P. Strong Store and of the Narciso Valdez House, which are listed on the National Register of Historic Places.

In April 2022, Ocate was threatened by the Cooks Peak Fire, which burned tens of thousands of acres in Mora and Colfax counties.

Ocate is within the Ocate volcanic field.
