= Black Lake, New Mexico =

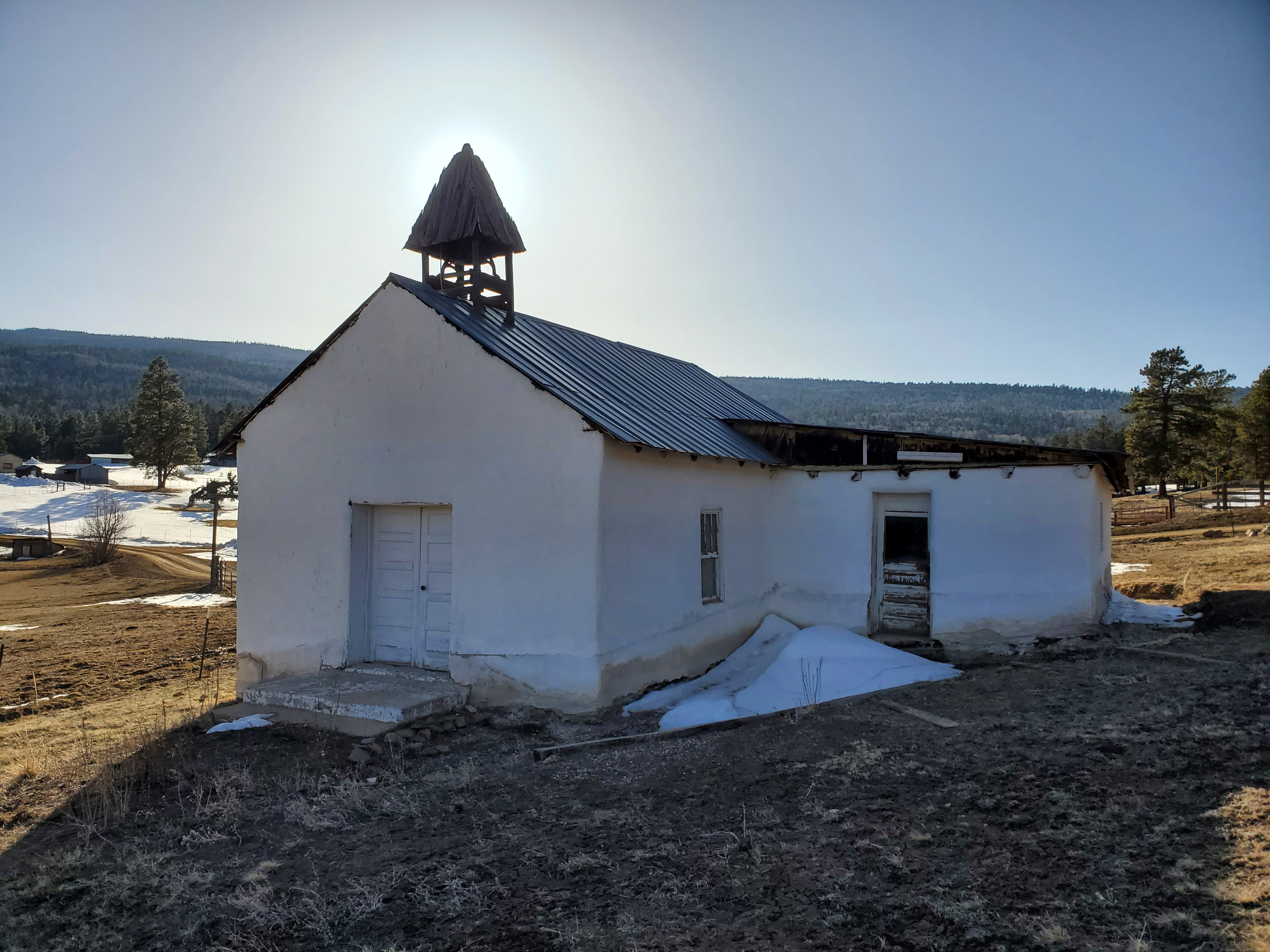
- San Antonio Catholic Church in Black Lake

- Location of Black Lake in New Mexico and in the United States Black Lake, New Mexico (the United States)
- Coordinates: 36°16′26″N 105°14′36″W
- Country: United States
- State: New Mexico
- County: Colfax

Government
  - Type: unincorporated community
- Elevation: 8,580 ft (2,620 m)
- Time zone: UTC−7 (Mountain (MST))
  - Summer (DST): UTC−6 (MDT)
- ZIP Code: 87722
- Area code: 575
- GNIS feature ID: 903868

Black Lake is an unincorporated community in Colfax County, New Mexico located approximately six miles south of Angel Fire on New Mexico State Road 434. The village had a post office from 1903 until it was closed in 1927. The town has a small chapel, San Antonio Catholic Church, overseen by Immaculate Conception in Cimarron, New Mexico.
