= Golondrinas, New Mexico =

Unincorporated community in New Mexico, US

Coordinates: 35°53′29″N 105°11′18″W

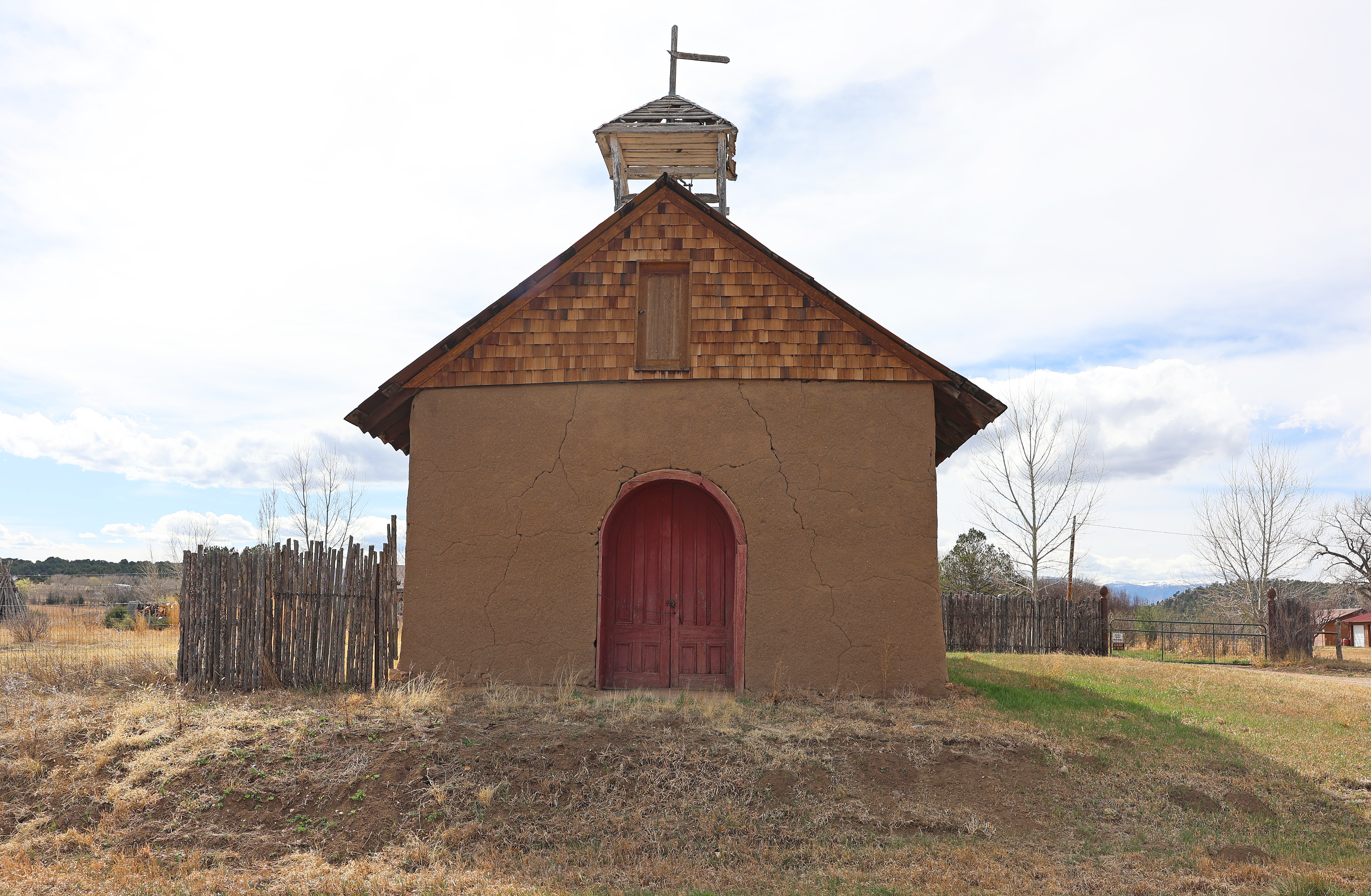
The Church of San Acacio in Golondrinas (2026)

Golondrinas ("The Swallows") is an unincorporated community in Mora County, New Mexico, United States, on State Route 161 next to the Mora River, approximately 18 mi (29 km) south of the town of Mora. It lies at an elevation of 6,821 ft (2,079 m).

Golondrinas was founded in 1835 as one of the villages in the 827,621-acre (3,349.26 km^{2}) Mora land grant and from 1851-1891 supplied Fort Union with produce.

In the center of the village is the adobe church San Acacio de las Golondrinas which was built in 1862. Golondrinas has never had its own post office, but its ZIP code is 87712.
