= Reverse stratigraphy =

Archaeological phenomenon

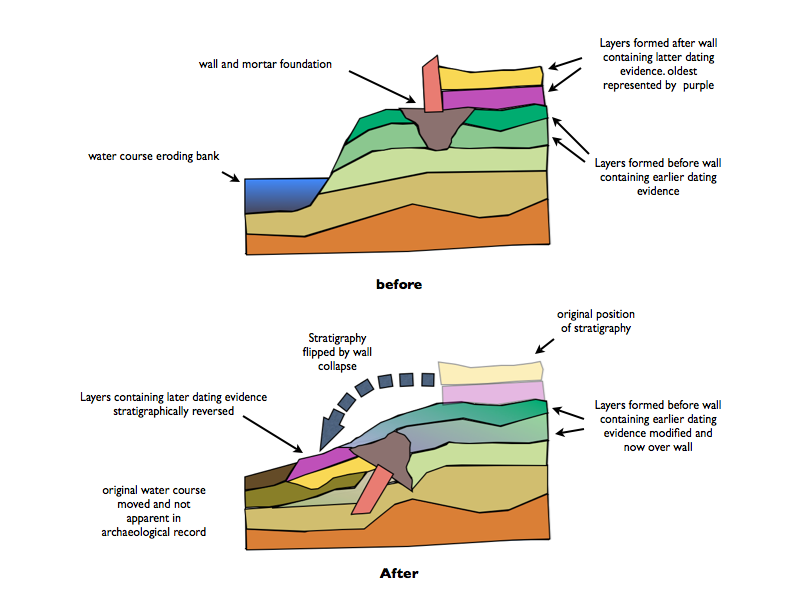
Example of how reversed archaeological stratigraphy may form.

Reverse stratigraphy (sometimes known as inverted stratigraphy) is the result of a process whereby one sediment is unearthed by human or natural actions and moved elsewhere, whereby the latest material will be deposited on the bottom of the new sediment, and progressively earlier material will be deposited higher and higher in the stratigraphy. Such events can be triggered by rockslides, tree throws, or other events which cause the strata of a deposit to be flipped or reversed. In archeological excavations a common cause of inversions in the stratigraphy is the collapse of walls on river banks or other raised mounds where deposits which have been cut through behind the wall prior to collapse slip over the collapsed structure resulting in the structure being under the deposits that originated earlier in time. In this case care must be taken to re-context the slipped deposits so the event of slippage appears in the correct place stratigraphically in the Harris matrix. There are numerous process that can reverse the stratigraphy or more accurately redeposit it. Many rely on slope processes, however other instances where deposits containing material later than overlying deposits occur in such features as drains or hypocaust systems. In these instances a clear understanding of the direction of "UP" and site formation processes is essential. Drains or hypocaust systems often have later material deposited within them during their "use", which may be much much later than either their initial construction or indeed the construction, use and disuse of the floors above them. Other human intervention, such as altering the ground level for architectural purposes by way of filling, can lead to an inversion of the stratigraphic layers.

== See also ==
- Archaeological association
- Archaeological section
- Feature (archaeology)
- Single context recording
