= Guadalupita, New Mexico =

- Unincorporated community
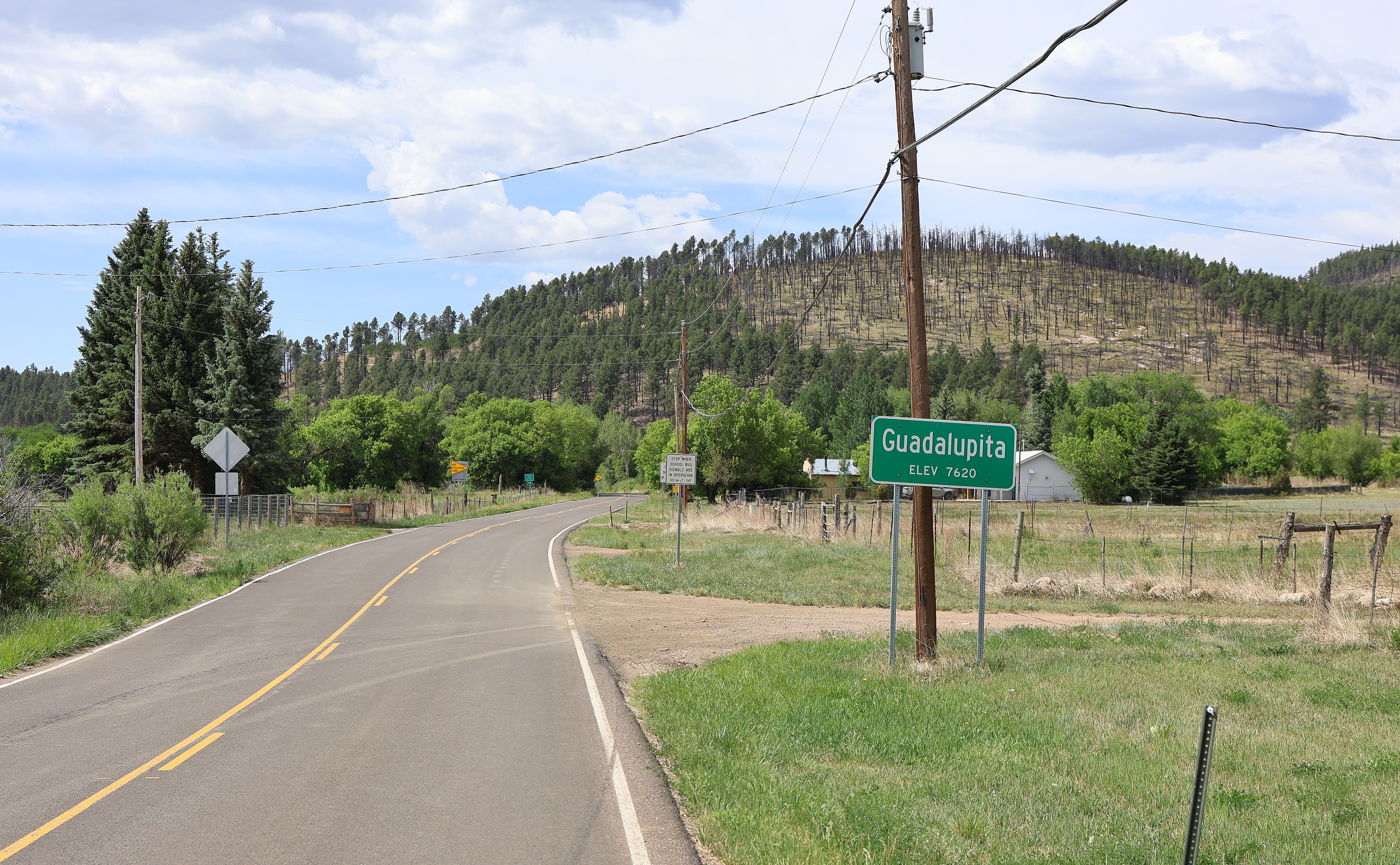
- Entering from the north on State Road 434 (2026)

- Location within New Mexico Location within the United States
- Coordinates: 36°08′15″N 105°14′19″W
- Country: United States
- State: New Mexico
- County: Mora
- Elevation: 7,566 ft (2,306 m)
- Time zone: UTC-7 (Mountain (MST))
  - Summer (DST): UTC-6 (MDT)
- ZIP codes: 87722
- Area code: 575

Guadalupita is an unincorporated community located in Mora County, New Mexico, United States. The community is located on New Mexico State Road 434, 14 miles (23 km) north-northeast of Mora. Guadalupita has a post office with ZIP code 87722, which opened on November 25, 1879.

The village of Guadalupita is included in the Guadalupita-Coyote Rural Historic District which was listed on the National Register of Historic Places in 2017.

Author, land grant historian, and attorney Malcolm Ebright (1932-2025) lived in Guadalupita for many years.
