= Wagon Mound, New Mexico =

- Village
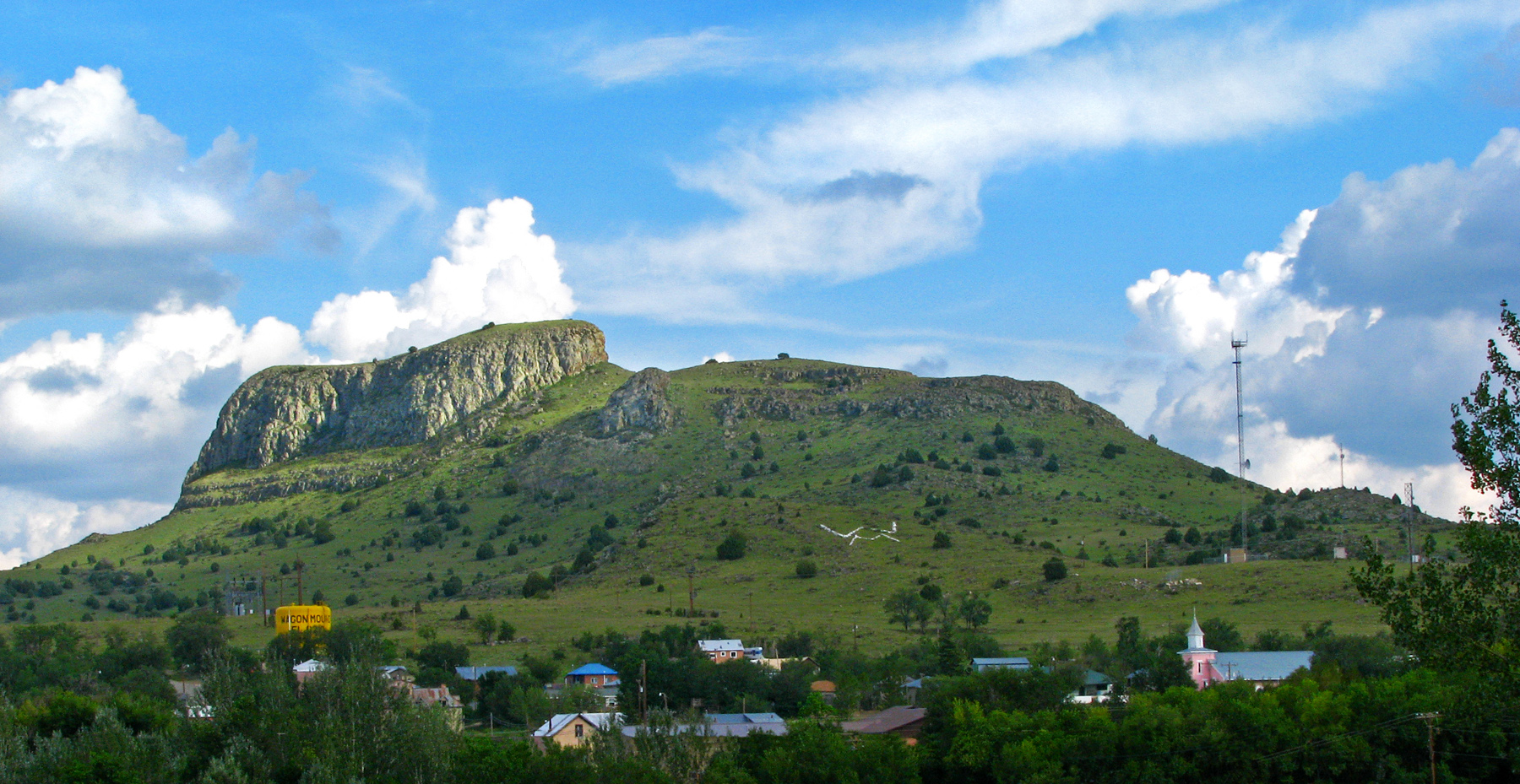
- Village of Wagon Mound

- Location of Wagon Mound, New Mexico

- Location in New Mexico Location in the United States
- Coordinates: 36°0′26″N 104°42′26″W
- Country: United States
- State: New Mexico
- County: Mora

Area
  - Total: 1.01 sq mi (2.62 km^{2})
  - Land: 1.01 sq mi (2.62 km^{2})
  - Water: 0 sq mi (0.00 km^{2})
- Elevation: 6,200 ft (1,890 m)

Population (2020)
  - Total: 266
  - Density: 262.9/sq mi (101.52/km^{2})
- Time zone: UTC−07:00 (MST)
  - Summer (DST): UTC−06:00 (MDT)
- ZIP Codes: 87735, 87752
- Area code: 575
- FIPS code: 35-83340
- GNIS feature ID: 0915913
- Website: www.wagonmound.org

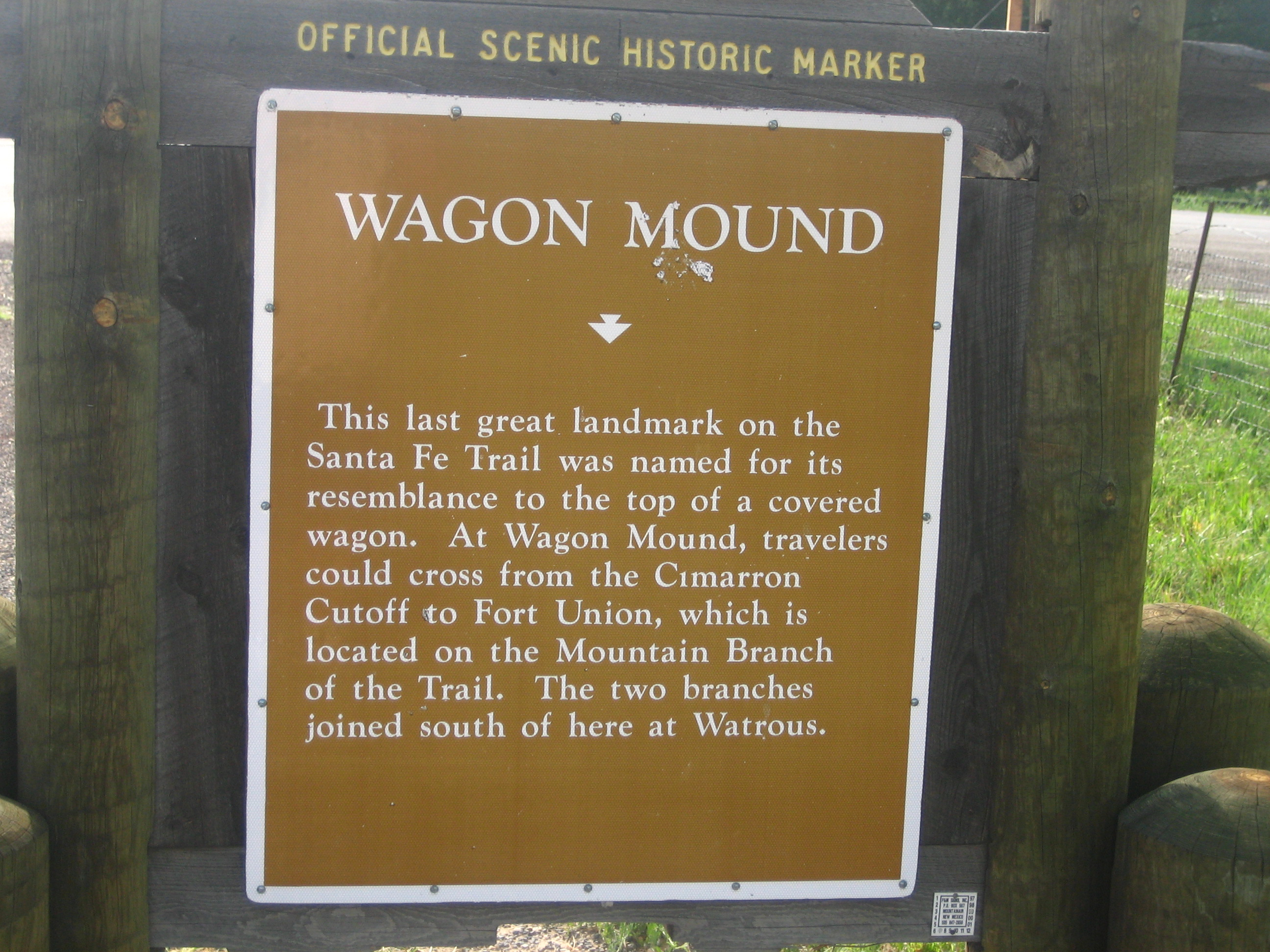
Wagon Mound sign

Wagon Mound is a village in Mora County, New Mexico, United States. It is named after and located at the foot of a butte called Wagon Mound, which was a landmark for covered wagon trains and traders going up and down the Santa Fe Trail and is now Wagon Mound National Historic Landmark. It was previously an isolated ranch that housed four families that served as local traders. The shape of the mound is said to resemble a Conestoga wagon. As of the 2020 census, the village population was 266. It was also called Santa Clara for many years. The village, with brightly painted houses and several stores and shops, is located on the plains of northeastern New Mexico. Interstate 25, which skirts the western side of town, gives a view of the majority of the town. Wagon Mound is not growing rapidly, but it has seen new construction along I-25, with new buildings on the northeast side of town as well. Wagon Mound was also the site of the 1850 Indian attack, the Wagon Mound Massacre.

== Geography ==
Wagon Mound is located at 36°0′26″N 104°42′26″W (36.007223, -104.707194).

According to the United States Census Bureau, the village has a total area of 1.0 square mile (2.6 km^{2}), all land.

== Demographics ==
Historical population
Census	Pop.	Note	%±
1920	875		—
1930	852		−2.6%
1940	979		14.9%
1950	1,120		14.4%
1960	760		−32.1%
1970	630		−17.1%
1980	416		−34.0%
1990	319		−23.3%
2000	369		15.7%
2010	314		−14.9%
2020	266		−15.3%
U.S. Decennial Census

As of the census of 2000, there were 369 people, 172 households, and 99 families residing in the village. The population density was 364.1 inhabitants per square mile (140.6/km^{2}). There were 230 housing units at an average density of 226.9 per square mile (87.6/km^{2}). The racial makeup of the village was 45.53% White, 51.22% from other races, and 3.25% from two or more races. Hispanic or Latino of any race were 87.80% of the population.

There were 172 households, out of which 26.7% had children under the age of 18 living with them, 36.0% were married couples living together, 18.0% had a female householder with no husband present, and 42.4% were non-families. 36.0% of all households were made up of individuals, and 18.0% had someone living alone who was 65 years of age or older. The average household size was 2.15 and the average family size was 2.81.

In the village, the population was spread out, with 23.3% under the age of 18, 6.5% from 18 to 24, 22.5% from 25 to 44, 24.4% from 45 to 64, and 23.3% who were 65 years of age or older. The median age was 43 years. For every 100 females, there were 98.4 males. For every 100 females age 18 and over, there were 92.5 males.

The median income for a household in the village was $17,273, and the median income for a family was $21,667. Males had a median income of $20,357 versus $16,964 for females. The per capita income for the village was $10,459. About 23.8% of families and 22.8% of the population were below the poverty line, including 23.2% of those under age 18 and 28.4% of those age 65 or over.

== Education ==
Wagon Mound Public Schools was founded in 1923. It consists of Wagon Mound Elementary School, which serves pre-kindergarten through sixth grade, and Wagon Mound High School, which serves seventh grade through 12th grade. Total enrollment was 62 at the end of the 2016–17 school year. Wagon Mound Public Schools is working with Luna Community College in Las Vegas, New Mexico to provide students with opportunities for college credit.

== Notable people ==
- Hector Balderas, New Mexico Attorney General
- Edward Chávez, painter

=== 1930 Tornado ===
On May 31, 1930, a deadly tornado struck the town, killing two men at an auto repair garage that was destroyed. As of 2022, this tornado and the March 23, 2007, Clovis EF2 tornado are the deadliest tornadoes to ever occur in New Mexico.

== Gallery ==
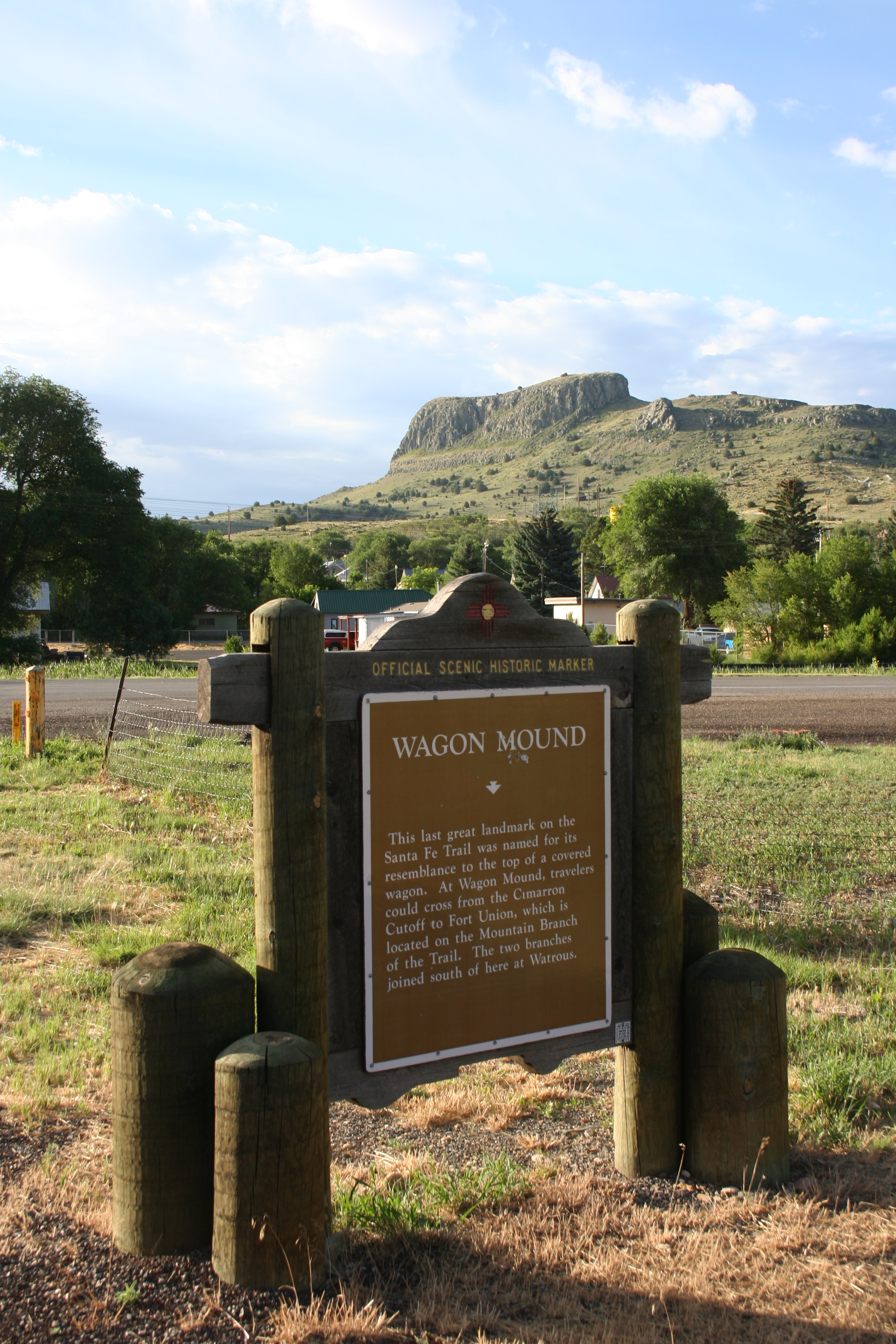
Wagon Mound Scenic Marker

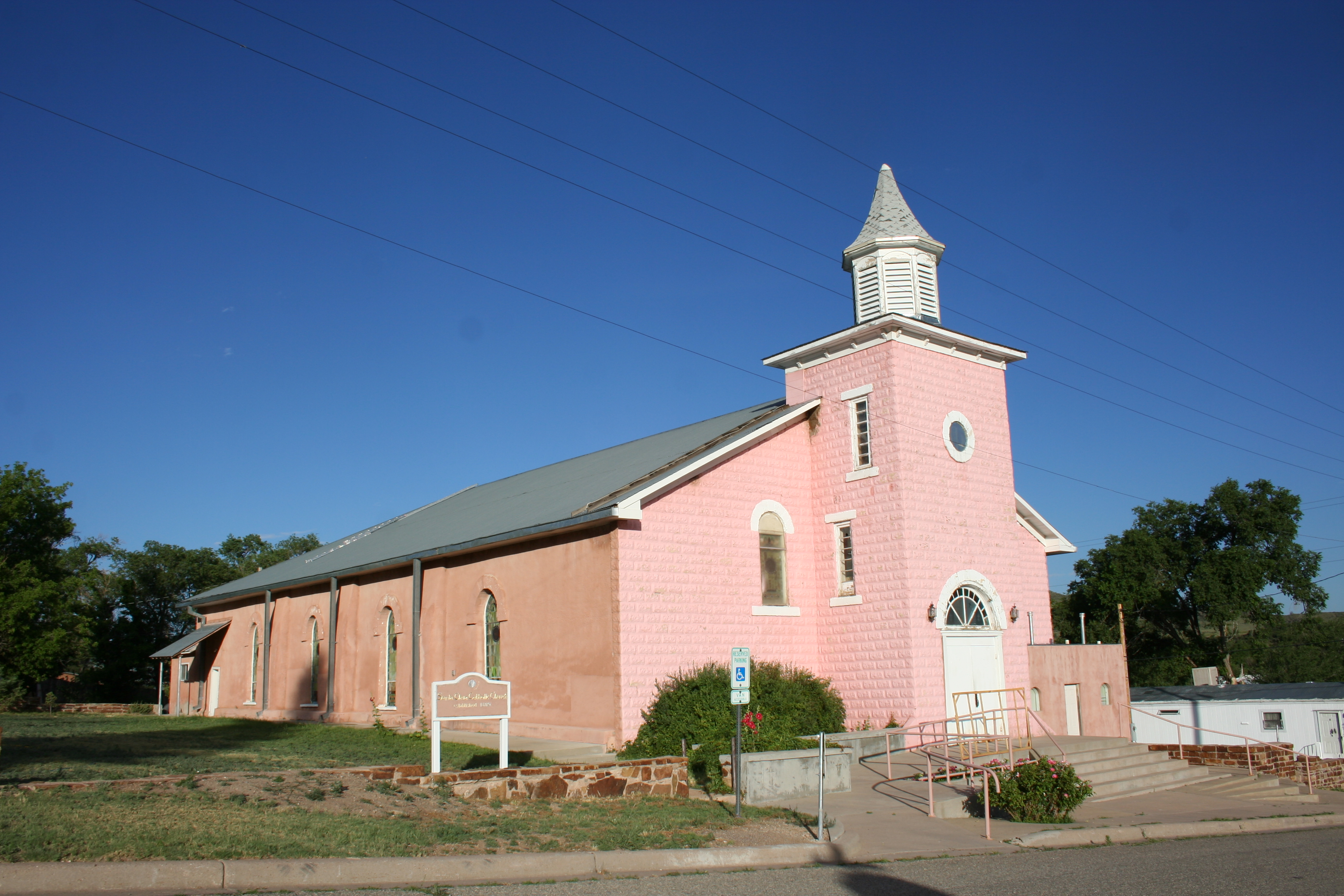
Santa Clara Catholic Church

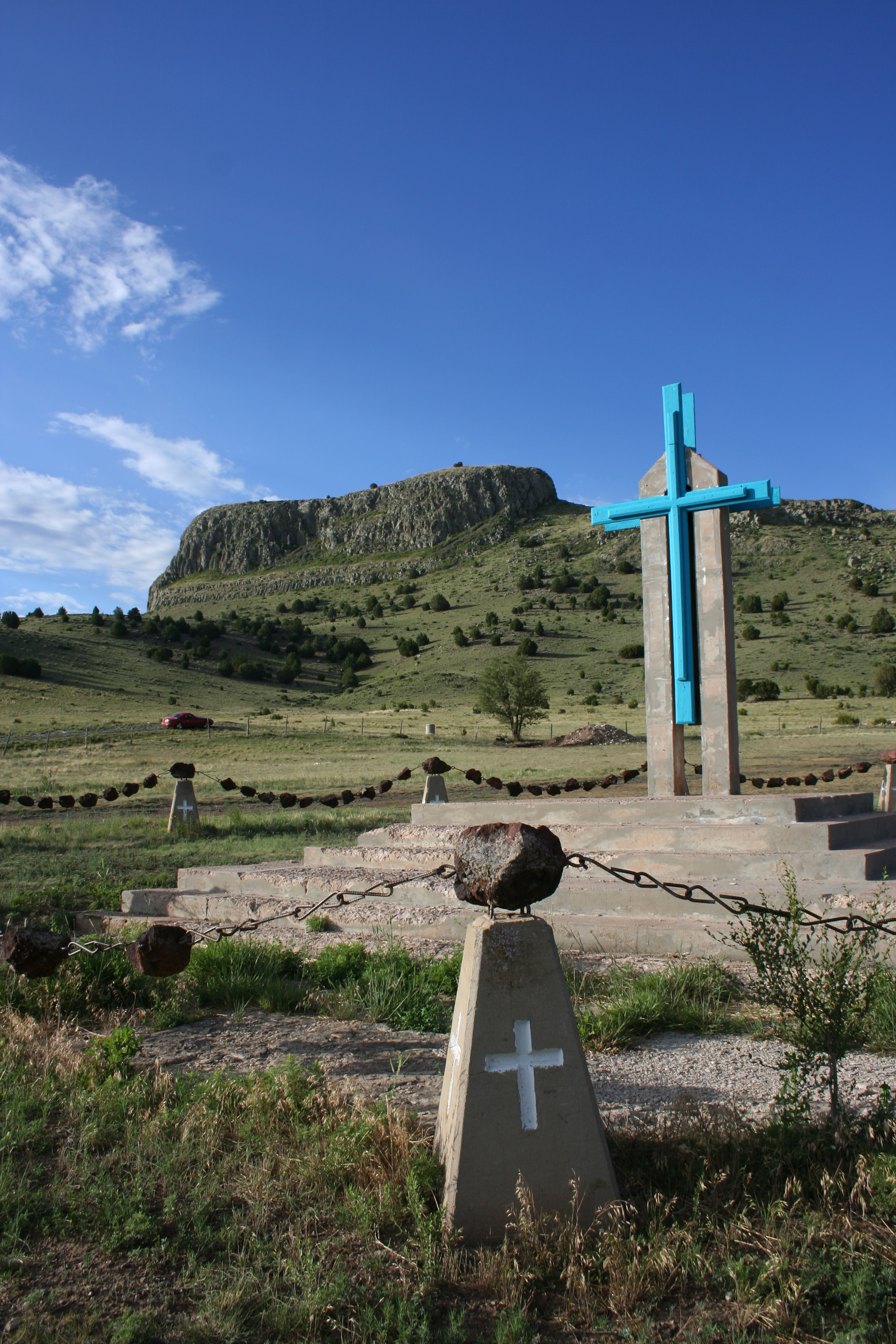
Santa Clara Cemetery

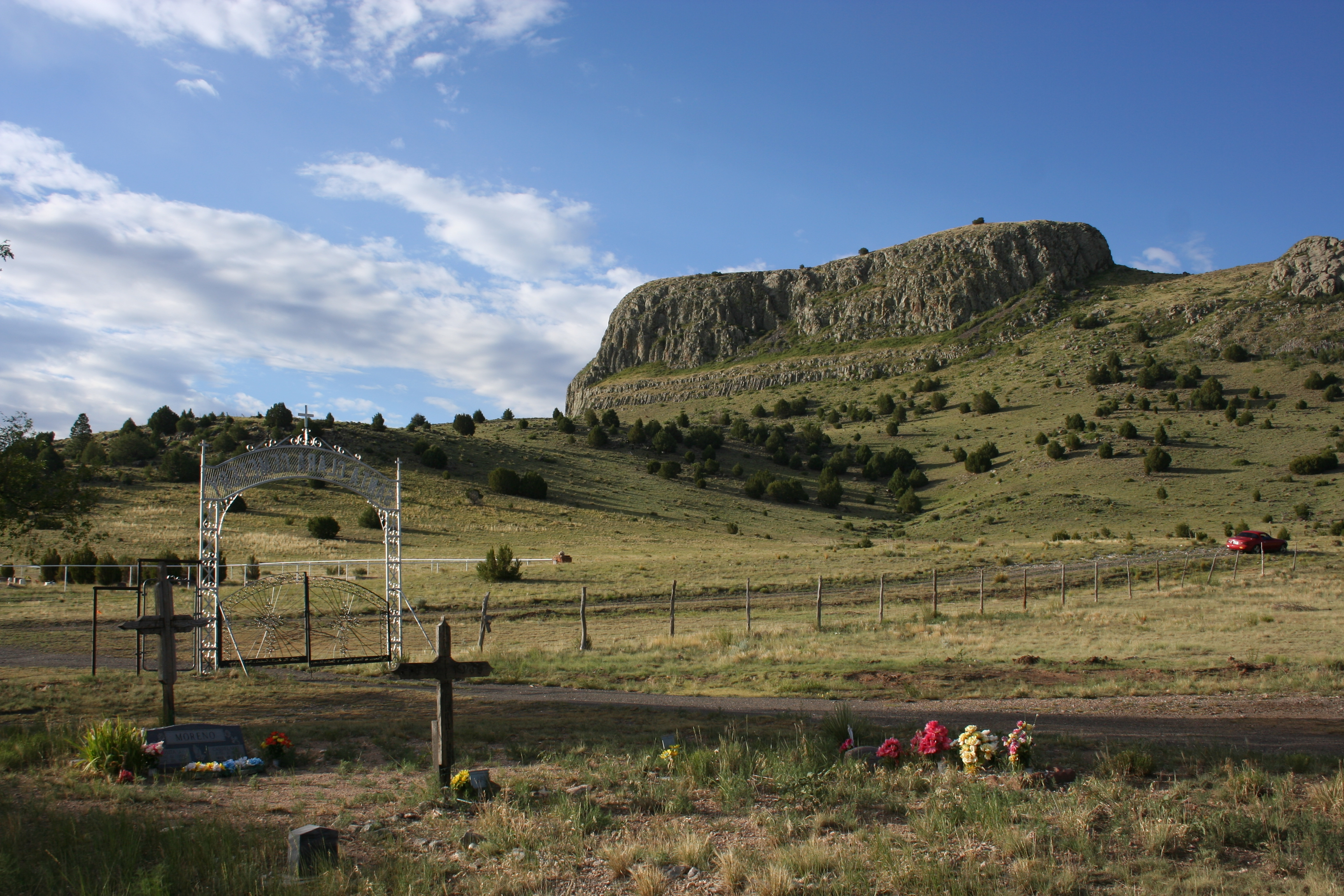
Wagon Mound from Santa Clara Cemetery
