= El Grito del Norte =

U.S. bilingual newspaper (1968–1973)

- Type: Semimonthly newspaper
- Format: Tabloid
- Associate editor: Jose Madril
- Managing editor: Elizabeth "Betita" Martínez
- Founded: 1968
- Ceased publication: 1973
- Political alignment: Left
- Language: English, Spanish
- Headquarters: Española, New Mexico

El Grito del Norte ("The Northern Call") was a bilingual (English and Spanish) newspaper based in Española, New Mexico, co-founded by the activist Elizabeth "Betita" Martinez and the attorney Beverly Axelrod in 1968. Before this, Martínez had worked with social issues such as the black movement and the Student Nonviolent Coordinating Committee while Axelrod had been involved in the first production of The Black Panther. The tabloid was originally the publication of the Reies Tijerina's Alianza Federal de Mercedes, an organization dedicated to recovering the lands of dispossessed Hispanos, whom Axelrod represented as a lawyer. It expanded to provide coverage of the Chicano Movement in urban areas, workers' struggles and Latino political prisoners, as well as other Leftist causes. The paper often advocated for the advancement of such minority groups as well as the Black and Native American communities.

El Grito was staffed by a mostly volunteer collective of editors, columnists, writers, artists, photographers and production workers. Of these, women, including Jane Lougee, Tessa Martinez, Adelita Medina, Kathy Montague, Sandra Solis, Rini Templeton, Valentina Valdes and Enriqueta Vásquez, were predominant. This gave the paper a decidedly feminist bent. Vasquez in particular wrote columns about racism, sexism and imperialism, often drawing from her own experiences to motivate Chicanos into joining the movement. Her collection, Enriqueta Vasquez and the Chicano Movement: Writings from El Grito del Norte consists of 44 columns that she wrote throughout her time with the newspaper. One major goal of the newspaper was training young Chicanas to run a newspaper. Two women who trained at El Grito went on to found their own newspaper, Tierra y Libertad, in Las Vegas, New Mexico.

The newspaper's social agenda countered prevailing negative images of Mexican-Americans by publishing cultural materials such as short stories, poetry, songs and recipes.

Though its existence was relatively short-lived, El Grito del Norte covered many notable events concerning the Chicano Movement in New Mexico. Some of these include the Alianza's creation of the People's Constitutional Party in 1968, the imprisonment of Reies Tijerina in 1969, the rise of Las Gorras Negras (Black Berets) between 1970 and 1971, the rise in police brutality in 1972 and the growing number of strikes and protests between 1972 and 1973 in the city of Artesia.

El Grito had a pro-socialist political agenda that was hostile to the power structure in New Mexico. This hostility prompted some repression. Antonio Cordova, a staff photographer, faced police harassment after photographing police teargassing protesters at a demonstration. He was later assassinated by the police in 1972.

El Grito del Norte ceased publication in 1973 when the managing editor, Martínez, and others moved to Albuquerque to found the Chicano Communications Center.
