= Land grants in New Mexico and Colorado =

Land grants in New Mexico and Colorado were awarded to individuals and communities by the Spanish and Mexican governments to encourage settlement and expansion of the Territorio de Nuevo Mexico, which included southern Colorado. Land grants by the Spanish and Mexicans between 1693 and 1846 numbered 291 in New Mexico, four partly in New Mexico and partly in Colorado, and three in Colorado. The land area of grants totaled tens of thousands of square miles. "The two major types of land grants were private grants made to individuals, and communal grants made to groups of people for the purpose of establishing settlements. Communal land grants were also made to Pueblos for the lands they inhabited." The majority of the land area within grants was designated as common land for residents. Common land was mostly used for grazing cattle and sheep and harvesting timber. Smaller acreages within the grants were devoted to irrigation agriculture and home sites. The principal objectives of the land grants were to encourage the foundation of new communities and to expand the settled area on the frontiers of New Mexico for defense from Native American raids an encroachments by the United States.

After its conquest of New Mexico in 1846, the United States adjudicated the grants and confirmed 157 as valid. The peace treaty between the U.S. and Mexico in 1848 guaranteed the right of former Mexican citizens to their land, but the adherence to that language was inconsistent and compromised by U.S. legal actions which were often corrupt and biased in favor of White claimants and White land practices. By the early 20th century, the Hispano grantees and their descendants had lost a large percentage of the grant land to Whites and public domain national forests. Hispano protests, legal action, and occasional violence to regain or retain their traditional rights to usage of grant lands continued into the 21st century.

== History during the colonial period ==
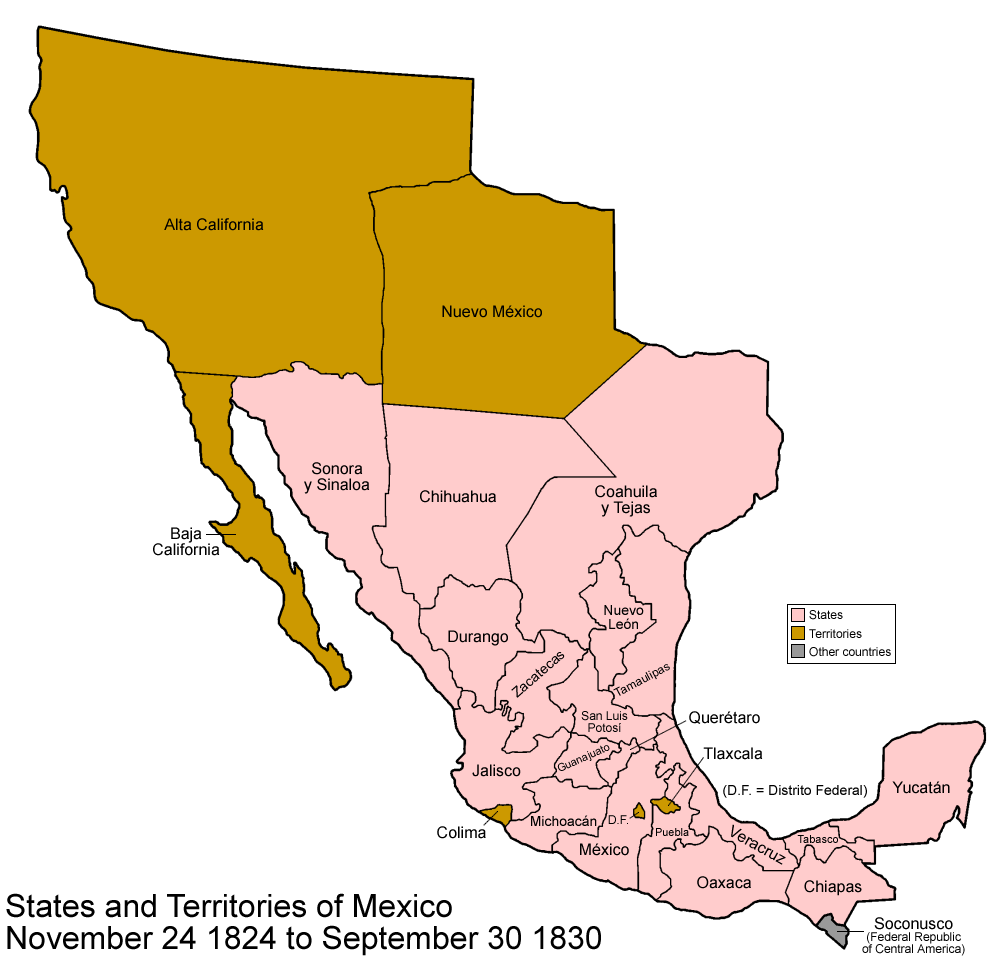
Context map showing the Mexican state of Nuevo México in much of the first decade after Mexican Independence (map represents territorial extent from November 1824 to 1830).

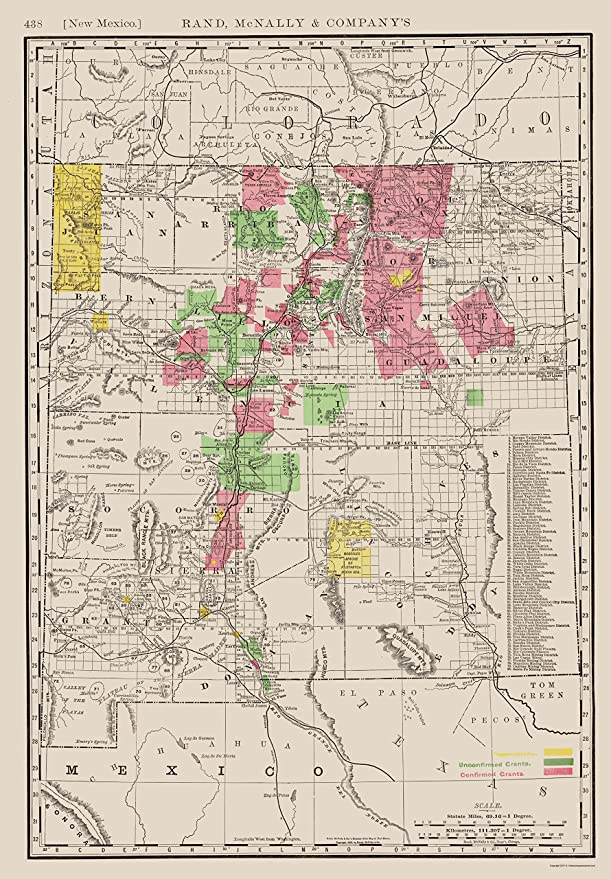
Rand McNally's 1897 map of New Mexico showing land grants recognized by the U.S.(red), not recognized (green), and some of the Indian reservations in the state (yellow).

Juan de Oñate established a colony in New Mexico in 1598. The initial settlement comprised more than 500 soldiers and settlers, including at least 129 men of fighting age, ten Franciscan missionaries, and more than 7,000 head of livestock. New Mexico was at the time 600 miles (970 km) north of the nearest settlement of Santa Bárbara, Chihuahua. The remoteness of New Mexico from the seat of government in Mexico remained a characteristic of the settlement during the next two and one-half centuries.

In 1598, about 50,000 Puebloans inhabited the valley of the Rio Grande River and its tributaries in New Mexico. They were sedentary agricultural people living in about 60 villages, mostly near sources of irrigation water. Their numbers decreased to about 16,500 by 1680. The decline was due to war, Spanish exploitation, and epidemics of diseases with European origins. Surrounding the New Mexico colony of Mexican settlers and Pueblo peoples were nomadic and semi-nomadic Indians: Apaches to the east and south, Navajo to the west, Ute to the north, and in the 18th century Comanche to the north and east.

In the early years of the colony, governors rewarded their supporters and soldiers in New Mexico with encomiendas which gave the grantee the right to exploit Pueblo labor and extract tribute, but did not give the grantee legal ownership of the land itself. The encomienda system was one of the grievances which led to the Pueblo Revolt (1680–1692) and the expulsion of the colonists from New Mexico by the Pueblos. After the Spanish Empire reconquered New Mexico in 1692–1693, their land policies became more conciliatory. They did not attempt to reimpose the encomienda system but rather made grants of land to communities (including Pueblo villages) and individuals. Subsequently, the Mexicans and their Pueblo subjects became allied due to raids, often retaliatory, by the surrounding Indian tribes, especially the Comanche who after 1706 became a major threat to the New Mexican colony. In 1821, Mexico (including the province of New Mexico) attained independence from Spain. The government of New Mexico continued to make grants to individuals and communities until Mexico became a possession of the United States after the Mexican–American War (1846–1848).

== Grants ==
From 1692 to 1846, the Spanish and Mexican governments awarded land grants to individuals, communities, and Pueblo villages. The U.S. recognized for adjudication 295 grants in New Mexico, four of which extended into southern Colorado, and three grants entirely in southern Colorado. The land grants later judged by the U.S. to be legal ranged in size from 200 acres (81 ha) for Cañada Ancha (now a suburb of Santa Fe) to 1,714,765 acres (6,939.41 km^{2}) for the Maxwell Land Grant on the eastern slope of the Sangre de Cristo Mountains extending northward into Colorado. Although the terms of each grant varied they fell into two broad categories: grants to communities and to individuals. Community grants included those made to Pueblo villages. The procedure for attaining a grant was for communities or individuals to submit petitions to the Governor of New Mexico who after investigation and consultation with local authorities approved the grant. The boundaries of a grant were often vague, "a river, a ridge, an arroyo," etc.

Between 1854 and 1904 the U.S. government adjudicated and "confirmed" (recognized the validity of) 154 of the grants in New Mexico and three in Colorado. Forty-seven New Mexican grants were to individuals, 84 were grants to communities, and 23 were grants to Pueblo villages. Individual grants were more common in the 18th century and community grants in the 19th century. Confirmed grants in New Mexico originally comprised about 12,000 sq mi (31,000 km^{2}) of land of which 98 percent was lost to the original owners and their descendants during and since the adjudication period. As of 2015, about 35 of the community grants in New Mexico continued to function, had boards of trustees, and owned in common about 200,000 acres (810 km^{2}) of land.

=== Grants to communities ===
Community grants were made to groups of settlers. Each settler received a house site and an irrigatable plot for agriculture. Most of the land, however, was held in common for all members of the community. Uses made of the common land included pastures for livestock, water, timber, firewood, hunting, fishing, foraging, and rock quarrying. Settlers owned their house sites and agricultural plots after four years of residence. The settler could sell his land and house, but the common property could not be sold. The primary economic activities of the settlers were subsistence agriculture and raising sheep or cattle. Many of the community grants were made for the purpose of defending the New Mexican frontier from Indian raids. After a durable peace with the Comanche was negotiated in 1786, settlement of frontier areas accelerated.

==== Grants to Pueblos ====
Spanish community grants to Pueblo villages dated as early as the 1690s and grants were made to 23 villages. The usual practice was for the Spanish to grant ownership of land in common to the residents of a pueblo. The standard size of a Pueblo land grant was one league in each cardinal direction from the church on the central plaza in the Pueblo. The acreage of each grant was, thus, four square leagues, later determined to be 17,712 acres (7,168 ha). A buffer area around the Pueblo land prohibited outsiders from grazing their livestock and growing crops. Nevertheless, encroachments on Pueblo land occurred. The sale of grant lands to non-Pueblos was permitted, but with restrictions.

When the United States acquired New Mexico, it initially regarded the Pueblos as full citizens and not entitled to any special protection. Encroachment on and sales of Pueblo land continued into the 20th century. In a series of decisions in the early 20th century, the U.S. reversed course and asserted legal guardianship of Pueblo land and forbade Pueblo peoples from selling land without Congressional permission. Legal disputes concerning land ownership and the respective rights and obligations of the Pueblos and the U.S. government continued into the 21st century.

=== Grants to individuals ===
The Spanish and Mexicans also granted land to individuals—or in some cases two people—as private property. The grantee could do as he wished with the land after the terms of the grant were met. In the case of some grants, such as the Sangre de Cristo Land Grant in southern Colorado, the individual grant functioned similar to a community grant. The grantee recruited settlers by providing them with tracts of land for agriculture and homes and access to common lands.

During the last years of Mexican rule, the New Mexican governor made several large individual grants to reward supporters and cronies, bolster possession of land on the periphery of New Mexico, and counter growing U.S. influence, including fear of invasion of New Mexico by either the U.S. or Texas which was independent from 1836 to 1845.

== U.S. rule ==
New Mexico in 1850 had a population of 56,223 mostly Spanish-speaking Indigenous Hispanos and detribalized Native Americans ("genizaros"), and including about 10,000 Puebloans. A salient fact is that it was an austere land in which sources of potential wealth were scarce—with the exception of land and mining—for an increasing population of Whites and Hispanos. Ownership of land was the vehicle for wealth and prominence in the American territory of New Mexico (1848–1912).

The United States agreed in the Treaty of Guadalupe Hidalgo (1848) that all residents of former Mexican territory had the right of "retaining the property which they possess in the said territories, or disposing thereof, and removing the proceeds wherever they please." The history in New Mexico and southern Colorado of land grants since the treaty consists of attempts to reconcile U.S. land laws with those of Mexico and adjudicating disputes between grant owners and claimants and the largely Anglo new arrivals to the territory and state. These disputes have continued into the 21st century. In the legal controversies about land grants and their owners, millions of acres of land have ended up as the property of wealthy Anglos or in the public domain, mostly as National Forests, of the United States.

In 1854, the U.S. established the Office of the Surveyor General for New Mexico to investigate land grants and recommend their disposition to the U.S. Congress. Claimants of land grants had to petition the Surveyor General to confirm their grant, but the claimants often did not speak English and were suspicious of and unfamiliar with the American legal system—so different from Spanish and Mexican systems. Many of the claimants were poor and unable to pursue the lengthy and expensive legal process of getting a claim confirmed. Moreover, the first and succeeding Surveyors General had little knowledge of Hispano land practices and customs. "The situation was ripe for fraud." The results were "large grants owned by speculators were erroneously confirmed; other grants which should have been confirmed were not...[and]...some valid grants were confirmed, but to the wrong people." The notorious Santa Fe Ring of lawyers and politicians, often in league with the Surveyors General, abused the adjudication system.

The shortcomings of the Office of Surveyor General resulted in the creation by the U.S. government of the Court of Private Land Claims in 1891 which established an adversarial system in which a panel of five judges decided land grant disputes. However, the attorney's office representing the United States had far greater legal resources than the claimants. In 1897, the U.S. Supreme Court made a ruling which also disadvantaged claimants. Title to the common lands of Spanish and Mexican land grants, the court decided, was held by the sovereign, i.e. the government of the United States. The consequences of losing access to resources on former common lands were severe for many Hispano settlements. The small garden plots individuals and families retained were inadequate for their subsistence.

Hispanos resisted the land policies of the United States. Among the movements and events at least partially related to land disputes were the Taos Revolt (1847), which saw the murder of several large land grantees. Attempts to expel both Hispano and Anglo settlers from the Maxwell Land Grant resulted in violent resistance from 1866 until 1899. Causes of the famous Lincoln County War (late 1860s to 1881), involving, among others, Billy the Kid; and the Colfax County War (1873–1888) included land disputes. Las Gorras Blancas (the White Caps) in San Miguel County from the 1880s until the 1920s cut pasture fences and committed several violent acts. The shadowy La Mano Negra (the Black Hand) flourished in Rio Arriba County in the 1920s and 1930s to protest Anglo ownership of the former common lands of the Tierra Amarilla Land Grant.

In 1967, the Alianza Federal de Mercedes, led by Reies Tijerina, raided the Rio Arriba County Courthouse. The objective was to make a citizen's arrest of the district attorney "to bring attention to the unscrupulous means by which government and Anglo settlers had usurped Hispanic land grant properties." An armed struggle resulted in which two persons were wounded and Tijerina was arrested and sentenced to prison. In 2014, also in Rio Arriba County, the Forest Service was accused of using "Gestapo-like tactics" to prevent local residents from accessing the National Forest for traditional uses such as grazing livestock.

In Colorado in 2021, a judge settled a long-running dispute in which descendants of settlers on the Sangre de Cristo Land Grant sued for access to the former common lands of the grant (the property of an Anglo rancher) by deciding in favor of the descendants.

== Notable land grants in New Mexico and Colorado ==
The following list of notable land grants in New Mexico and Colorado highlights some of the issues and controversies associated with land grants.

- Alameda Land Grant - (granted 1710, confirmed 1892, original size 89,346 acres (361.57 km^{2}) Situated on the west bank of the Rio Grande and presently a part of Albuquerque and Rio Rancho, the Alameda Grant was given to Francisco Montes Vigil, who sold the land two years later to Captain Juan Gonzales of the Spanish Army. In 1929, 20,500 acres (83 km^{2}) were purchased by Albert F. Black who established the Seven Bar Ranch. The Black family built an adobe home and in 1947 a small airport which was known as the "Alameda Airport". Surrounded by growing urban areas, the Black family sold off much of the remaining ranch for the development of new residential subdivisions. The Alameda Airport remained in operation until 1986. Cottonwood Mall opened on the airport site in 1996.
- Atrisco Land Grant - (granted 1692, confirmed 1894, original size 82,729 acres (334.79 km^{2}) The Atrisco Land Grant dates from 1692 when the Spanish government gave land to Fernando Duran y Chavez for his military service during the reconquest of New Mexico. The name of the grant derives from a Nahuatl word. The town of Atrisco was on the west bank of the Rio Grande River. By 1760, two hundred people lived in Atrisco and a second village, San Ignacio, was established on the Rio Puerco. The grant area is now in the metropolitan area of Albuquerque. Grant heirs have formed a private corporation to manage development of the remaining grant lands.
- Baca land grants - Five areas each of almost 100,000 acres (40,000 ha) in size located in New Mexico, Colorado, and Arizona. The grants are also called the "Baca floats."
- Elena Gallegos Land Grant - (granted 1693, confirmed 1893, original size 35,049 acres (141.84 km^{2}) The Elena Gallegos Land Grant was created in 1693 for Diego Montoya. In 1712 the grant, stretching from the crest of the Sandia Mountains to the Rio Grande, was transferred to Elena Gallegos. Much of northern Albuquerque is built on the former land grant. A large open space preserve is named for Elena Gallegos.
- Las Trampas Land Grant, (granted 1751, confirmed 1860, original size 28,132 acres (11,385 ha)
- Maxwell Land Grant (granted 1843, confirmed 1860, original size 1,714,765 acres (6,939.41 km^{2}) The largest land grant confirmed by the United States, it was originally titled the Beaubien and Miranda Grant, but both of the grantees were killed in the Taos revolt in 1847. The grant covers the area from the Great Plains near Raton, New Mexico westward to the crest of the Sangre de Cristo Range and extends northward into Colorado. The largest surviving piece of the grant is Ted Turner's Vermejo Park Ranch, a guest ranch of about 585,000 acres (2,370 km^{2}).
- Mora Land Grant (granted 1835, confirmed 1876, size 827,621 acres (334,926 ha) (1,293 square miles). Located mostly in Mora County, New Mexico, the great majority of grant land is now in private ownership or part of a National Forest.
- Sangre de Cristo Land Grant
- San Miguel del Vado Land Grant originally 350,000 acres in the Pecos River valley south of Pecos Pueblo. This land grant was a contributing factor in the demise of the nearby Pecos Pueblo, which deteriorated from one of the largest settlements of the Pueblo people to the point of the last families abandoning their land and moving to Jemez Pueblo. Overpopulation pressure and military protection centered at the settlement of San Miguel del Vado which also contributed to the establishment of other land grants northeast of it, including the Las Vegas Land Grant.
- Tierra Amarilla Land Grant

== See also ==
- Malcolm Ebright
- Ranchos of California
- Spanish land grants in Florida
