= Rini Templeton =

American artist

Lucille Corinne Templeton (July 1, 1935 – June 15, 1986), better known as "Rini" Templeton, was an American graphic artist, sculptor, and political activist. She was most active in Mexico and the Southwestern United States, although she also volunteered in Cuba and Nicaragua after the triumph of the Cuban Revolution and the electoral victory of the F.S.L.N. Although her name is not well known, her uncredited work has been used on countless fliers, posters, and banners for the labor, feminist, and social justice movements.

== Youth and education ==
Templeton was born in Buffalo, New York to a middle-class family. Her mother had two other children, a boy and a girl, before her family relocated to Washington, D.C. in 1943, where her father worked for the government's Bureau of the Budget. She exhibited signs of genius early on, and a local daily called The Evening Star published her poem about V-E Day on May 13, 1945. Her family moved to Chicago in June 1946, and, in 1947, she was given a full scholarship to the University of Chicago Laboratory School. From 1947 to 1949, she was a "Quiz Kid" on an NBC radio (and later television) show that featured questions asked of child prodigies in their fields of interest. Her winnings from the show later provided her independence from her family and from many economic pressures. This allowed her to travel, to dedicate herself to art and activism, and to donate her art to the struggles she espoused. She built her own darkroom at age 13, and, in 1949, published a collection of poems entitled Chicagoverse (under the name "Rinny" Templeton).

By 1950, she was the editor of the school's paper, and was on the editorial board of the Chicago Maroon (the whole of which faced McCarthy-era blacklisting) from 1951 to 1952. She hitchhiked around the U.S. from 1952 to 1954, and traveled Europe from 1955 to 1957, during which time she began a study of sculpture under Bernard Meadows at the Bath Academy in Corsham, England (where she briefly wed Scottish musician Alistair Graham) and spent time busking on the streets of London. She produced her first known commercial artwork in Mallorca, Spain, at the end of 1956, before resettling in Taos, New Mexico. She spent the next six years primarily in Taos, during which time she was art editor with Edward Abbey for the progressive newspaper El Crepúsculo, but also studied sculpture at Skowhegan School of Painting and Sculpture in Skowhegan, Maine, and printmaking at La Esmeralda in Mexico City. It was at this time that Templeton became involved in the Cuban Revolution.

== Cuba ==
On January 1, 1959, Templeton was in Havana, Cuba, having entered the country from Mexico with a group of students, to welcome the insurgents led by Fidel Castro as they entered the city. In early 1961, when an American invasion seemed imminent, she became active with the organization Amigos de Cuba, a group of Americans resident in Cuba who opposed intervention. The Amigos wrote articles, circulated petitions, and marched in opposition to the Bay of Pigs invasion. She then enlisted in one of the Worker's Brigades and was stationed in Las Vegas del Toro, a village near the U.S. naval base at Guantanamo Bay. From September to December 1961, she participated in the Cuban government's literacy campaign. In the same year, she attended the First Congress of Writers and Artists and the Festival de Teatro Obrero-Campesino, and before leaving the country in 1964, had cut sugarcane, taught ceramics, and founded the Taller de Grabado de la Catedral de la Habana (Havana Cathedral Printmaking Workshop). She also wrote articles in defense of the Revolution for the National Guardian. At some point during her stay in Cuban, she married a Cuban artist who she presumably later divorced. She was initially denied re-entry into the United States, but was finally permitted on the condition that she not speak about her experiences in Cuba or the successes of the Cuban government.

== New Mexico ==
Templeton returned to Taos in 1965, moving shortly thereafter to nearby Pilar Hill, where she married artist John DePuy in 1966. She was staff artist of El Grito del Norte from 1968 to 1973, a journal initially founded in support of the Alianza Federal de Mercedes, and staff artist of The New Mexico Review and Legislative Journal from 1969 to 1972, during which time she worked closely with novelist John Nichols. Both publications were leftist journals that covered the Vietnam War, the land struggles at Tierra Amarilla, U.S. intervention in Latin America, and other issues of concern to Chicanos, Native Americans, and progressives. She had her first solo exhibition, in 1969, at the Stables Gallery of the Taos Art Association. In 1970, she taught an art workshop to patients at the Austen Riggs Center, a Stockbridge, Massachusetts psychiatric hospital. She had separated from DePuy by 1973. After El Grito ceased publication, she worked with her former colleague from the paper Elizabeth Martínez on 450 Years of Chicano History/450 Años del Pueblo Chicano, which, when published in 1976, was one of the first Chicano histories. She also set up a workshop to teach silkscreening to young people, and, just after the coup against the government of Salvador Allende, provided images for a large pamphlet of the Pablo Neruda's poetry, intended to raise money for the struggle of the Chilean people.

Drawings by Templeton were used in Malcolm Ebricht's Land Grants & Lawsuits in Northern New Mexico.

== Mexico ==
In 1974, Templeton moved to Mexico, joining Mexico City's Taller de Gráfica Popular, which had been founded forty years earlier by Leopoldo Méndez. At that time, the Mexican Left was fighting on two major fronts: against charrismo and against IMF-imposed austerity policies, which included austerity capped wages, limited benefits, and crippled unions. The Mexican labor movement had suffered severe setbacks in prior years, but was engaged in a bitter and at times violent struggle nonetheless. It was to these parallel struggles that Templeton dedicated her time and talent, travelling to strikes and demonstrations throughout the country and often returning to the United States for mobilizations. Wherever she went, she drew what she saw and donated her art to the cause.

=== Strikes and actions visually documented ===
- 1970s Mexico City Children's Hospital workers struggle to maintain an independent union
- 1974 indigenous Zapotec Indians struggles in Juchitan
- late 1970s efforts by the Comite Pro-Defensa de Presos, Perseguidos, Desaparecidos y Exiliados Politicos to free imprisoned and disappeared people, some missing since the 1968 Tlatelolco massacre
- 1976 demonstrations against the police murder of young Jose Barlow Benavides in Oakland, California
- January 1977 visited Panama, documenting the idyllic and often poverty-ridden lifestyle, U.S. militarism, and popular support for Omar Torrijos she found there in her drawings
- 1977 Mexico City General Hospital strike
- 1977 STUNAM (Sindicato de Trabajadores de la Universidad Autonoma de Mexico) strike, a defeat that lead to anti-union laws and anti-union sentiment in Mexican higher education
- 1977 Mexican nuclear power workers fight for the right to strike
- 1977 SUTERM (Sindicato Unico de Trabajadores Electricistas de la Republica Mexicana), Mexico's national electrical worker's union, and Democratic Tendency's (whose membership was composed of individuals who had been expelled from SUTERM) struggle for democratic unions, organizing efforts, and the creation of Camp Dignity in front of Los Pinos that was later dismantled by police
- 1977 United Farm Workers strike in Delano, California
- 1977 Navajo struggle against relocation from Big Mountain, Arizona, about which she wrote a pamphlet
- 1978 copper miner's strike of La Caridad mine in Nacozari, Sonora for recognition of their union. The army took over the mine. She wrote and illustrated a pamphlet about the incidents to increase American awareness of the struggle
- 1978 for a strike against the Safeway grocery chain in Richmond, Virginia
- 1978 campaign against Proposition 13 (writing and illustrating a pamphlet, too) and the Bakke decision in California
- 1978 campesino life in Guerrero, home to several guerrilla movements from 1967–1974
- January 1979 demonstration against Right-to-Work laws in Santa Fe, New Mexico
- 1979 Farmworkers' struggle in Fresno, California
- 1979 fight to keep Chicago's Cook County Hospital open
- early 1980s struggles by the independent Coordinadora Nacional de Trabajadores de la Educacion (CNTE) (Independent Teachers Union) to fight for democratic unions and better conditions
- 1980 Nicaragua
- early 1980s Pro-Farabundo Martí National Liberation Front demonstrations in Mexico and San Francisco
- early 1980s anti-military actions at Kirtland Air Force Base in Albuquerque, New Mexico
- 1981 Farmworkers' struggles in El Mirage, Arizona
- 1981 worked closely with the independent union of Mexico City's Metropolitan University workers against austerity policies, designing publications for their press department
- April 10, 1981 Coordinadora Nacional Plan de Ayala (CNPA) farmer's march on Mexico City
- 1982 Coordinadora Sindical Nacional (CoSiNa) (National Coordinator of Unions-an umbrella group of over 50 labor groups) activities
- May 1, 1982 10th anniversary of the Vanguard Foundation in the Mission District's Dolores Park, San Francisco
- February 1982 commemoration of the 1980 prison uprising in Santa Fe, New Mexico
- 1983 mining strike in Cananea, Sonora, the first since 1906 (in the end, the military took over the mine)
- 1983 returned to support the farmworkers of El Mirage
- June 1983 sit-in at the Mexican Ministry of Labor in protest of pro-business policies
- June 25, 1983 First National Popular Worker-Peasant Assembly
- May 1984 Phelps-Dodge mine strike in Clifton and Morenci, Arizona (the National Guard was called in)
- August 1983 International Ladies Garment Workers Union strike in Los Angeles, California
- October 1983 demonstration against the Invasion of Grenada in Sacramento, California
- May 1985 Union Campesina Independiente (UCI) (Independent Small Farmers Union) congressional campaign in Veracruz
- May 1985 United Airlines strike
- September–October 1985 steel workers' strike of Aceros Chihuahua

== 1985 Mexico City earthquake ==
Templeton was in the United States when the earthquake struck, and immediately began putting together a relief fund. She also wrote a pamphlet that tied Mexico's difficulty in recovering from the earthquake to the government's austerity policies and political repression. She assured that the money she raised went to grassroots victim's and housing organizations rather than to government agencies.

== Work ==
Templeton began keeping sketchbooks during her youth. These sketchbooks accompanied her on her travels and she used them to draw what she saw. She incorporated stylization and abstraction via simplification into her style early on, eventually perfecting a genre she called "Xerox art". "Xerox art" refers to simple ink drawings that are easily reproducible using a photocopy (or Xerox) machine. This facilitated their use on signs and banners at demonstrations and in low-budget publications. A primary function of her work was didactic. She wrote and illustrated informational pamphlets on many subjects. She also wrote and illustrated two bilingual children's books that emphasized the social and moral value of labor, People Who Work in the Hospital/La Gente que Trabaja en el Hospital and People Who Work in the Supermarket/La Gente que Trabaja en los Supermercados. She also provided illustrations for a publication of the government of the Mexican state of Campeche entitled Los Ninos de Campeche Cantan y Juegan. Templeton produced almost-yearly pamphlets for the annual March 8 celebration of International Women's Day, and her work often features women prominently. Having mastered Spanish early on, she translated articles and prepared graphics for "Revolution and Intervention in Central America," a Special Emergency Issue of Contemporary Marxism. She also organized a travelling "mini-expo" for the Data Center in Oakland called "Your Right to Know" that examined issues of information accessibility in the United States. Her works continues to be used in NACLA publications.

It was during her time in New Mexico that she began sculpting in earnest. Here sculptures, mostly of welded or cast metal, reflected the influence of the natural forms of landforms, plants, and birds. She created dozens of works before quitting sculpting. Also, in New Mexico, she provided illustrations for John Nichols' The Milagro Beanfield War.

While in Mexico, she illustrated pamphlet on occupational safety in nuclear industries. She even produced a pamphlet on how to produce pamphlets. Rather than focussing on leaders, Templeton's visual works tend to emphasize collectivism, a crucial aspect of the labor and Chicano movements. They depict individuals with commitment, dignity, and intelligence, and in some ways visually refute the common stereotype of the "unwashed proletariat". She particularly enjoyed documenting cultural celebrations. Her final graphic work consisted of illustrations for Daniel Molina's Tlatelolco Mi Amor, a collection of writings highlighting Tlatelolco's centrality to the Mexican national identity. She did the cover art for his collection of poems Como Quieras; also highlights her print works in Mexico for record covers and concert ads for Los Folkloristas, Amparo Ochoa, Óscar Chávez and Salario Minimo.

== Personal life ==
Although she exhibited a great love for humanity as a whole, even some of her closest confidants remarked that they felt a certain distance from Templeton personally. She was intensely private about her personal, especially her family life. While she had romantic relationships with various men, she never developed lasting bonds with any of them. Her life was centered on selfless devotion to la causa, solidarity with workers, poor people, and the disadvantaged.

== Death ==
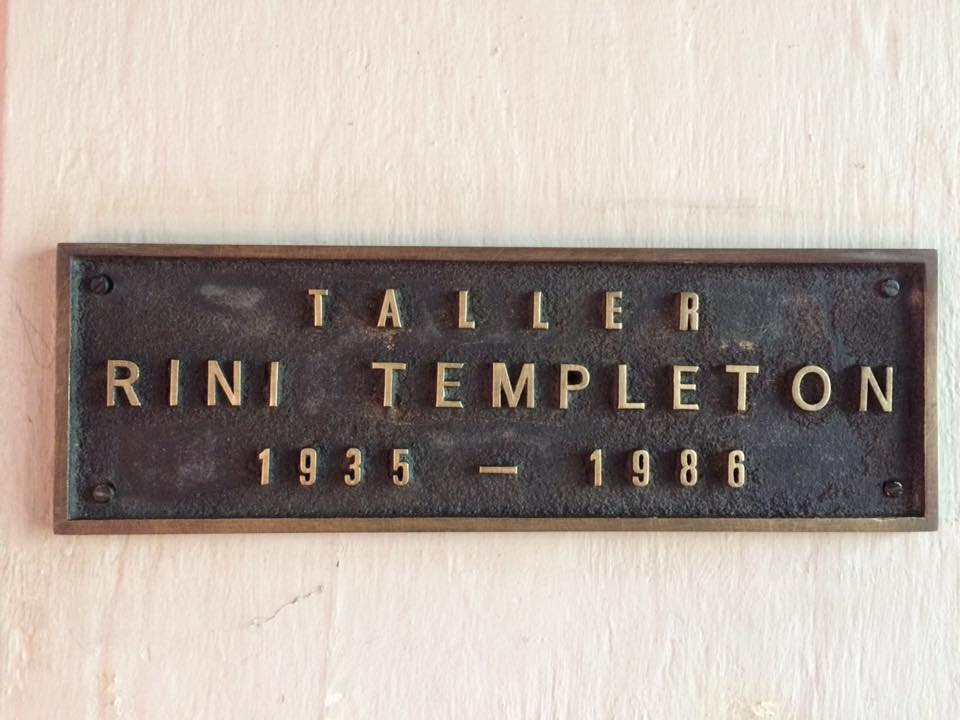
Rini Templeton Workshop at UAM-Xochimilco Graphic Design School, Mexico City.

On June 15, 1986, Templeton's body was found in her silkscreen studio. No cause of death was determined, but heart or lung failure are suspected, as she was a heavy smoker of unfiltered cigarettes. Her body was cremated and her ashes were scattered in New Mexico. In March 1987, the Rini Templeton Workshop was instituted at UAM-Xochimilco's school of graphic design. And in April 1987, a 490-unit apartment complex for earthquake victims in Mexico City was named for her in honor of her relief efforts.

== See also ==
- Venceremos Brigade

== Sources ==
- Nichols, John, et al. El Arte de/The Art of Rini Templeton. Mexico, D.F.: Centro de Documentacion Rini Templeton and Seattle: The Real Comet Press, 1988. ISBN 0-941104-24-9
