= Senator Lusk (disambiguation) =

Hall S. Lusk (1883–1983) was a U.S. Senator from Oregon in 1960. Senator Lusk may also refer to:

- Clayton R. Lusk (1872–1959), New York State Senate
- Gene Lusk (1920–1969), New Mexico State Senate
