= Fabian Chavez Jr. =

American politician

Fabian Chavez

Personal details
- Born: August 31, 1924 Wagon Mound, New Mexico, U.S.
- Died: January 20, 2013 (aged 88) Santa Fe, New Mexico, U.S.
- Party: Democratic
- Spouse: Coral Rustenbach (m. 1952–2006)
- Children: 1
- Education: Santa Fe University (attended); University of New Mexico, Albuquerque (BA)

Fabian Chavez Jr. (August 31, 1924 – January 20, 2013) was an American politician in the state of New Mexico and Majority Leader of the New Mexico Senate.

== Biography ==
Chavez was born in 1924 in Wagon Mound, New Mexico, one of 10 children. He graduated from Santa Fe High School and served in World War II. Chavez later attended St. Michael's College and the University of New Mexico. Chavez was elected as a Democrat to the New Mexico House of Representatives in 1950 and to the New Mexico Senate in 1956, becoming Majority Leader in 1961 and serving until 1965.

Chavez was the Democratic nominee for Governor of New Mexico in the 1968 election, losing to incumbent David Cargo by 3,000 votes. He also mounted unsuccessful campaigns for U.S. Congress in 1964 and 1970 and Governor in 1982. After his defeat, he served as New Mexico Director of Tourism from 1971–75 and Director of Development from 1975–77. Chavez served as United States Assistant Secretary of Commerce for Tourism under President Jimmy Carter.

Chavez died on January 20, 2013, at the age of 88, after a short illness.

== Personal life ==
Chavez and his wife, Coral Jeanne Rustenbach, were married 54 years before her death in 2006. They had one child, Christine J. Chavez Barrett, two grandchildren, and nine great grandchildren

Party political offices
Preceded by Gene Lusk	Democratic nominee for Governor of New Mexico; 1968	Succeeded by Bruce King
