= Tierra Amarilla Land Grant =

Tierra Amarilla Land Grant, New Mexico, Colorado
- Location within the state of New Mexico Tierra Amarilla Land Grant (the United States)
- Coordinates: 36°42′01″N 106°32′59″W
- Country: United States

Area
  - Total: 929 sq mi (2,410 km^{2})

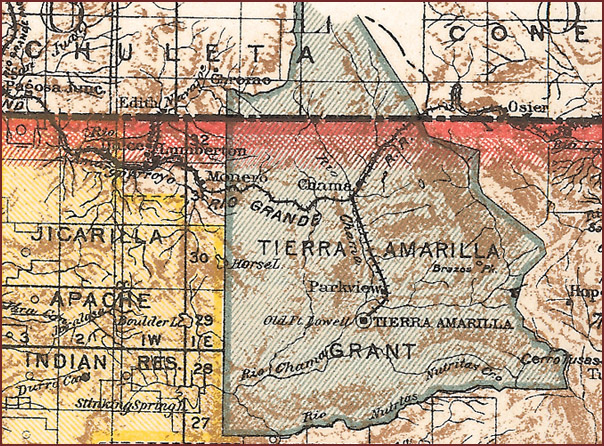
A map of the Tierra Amarilla Land Grant in New Mexico and Colorado

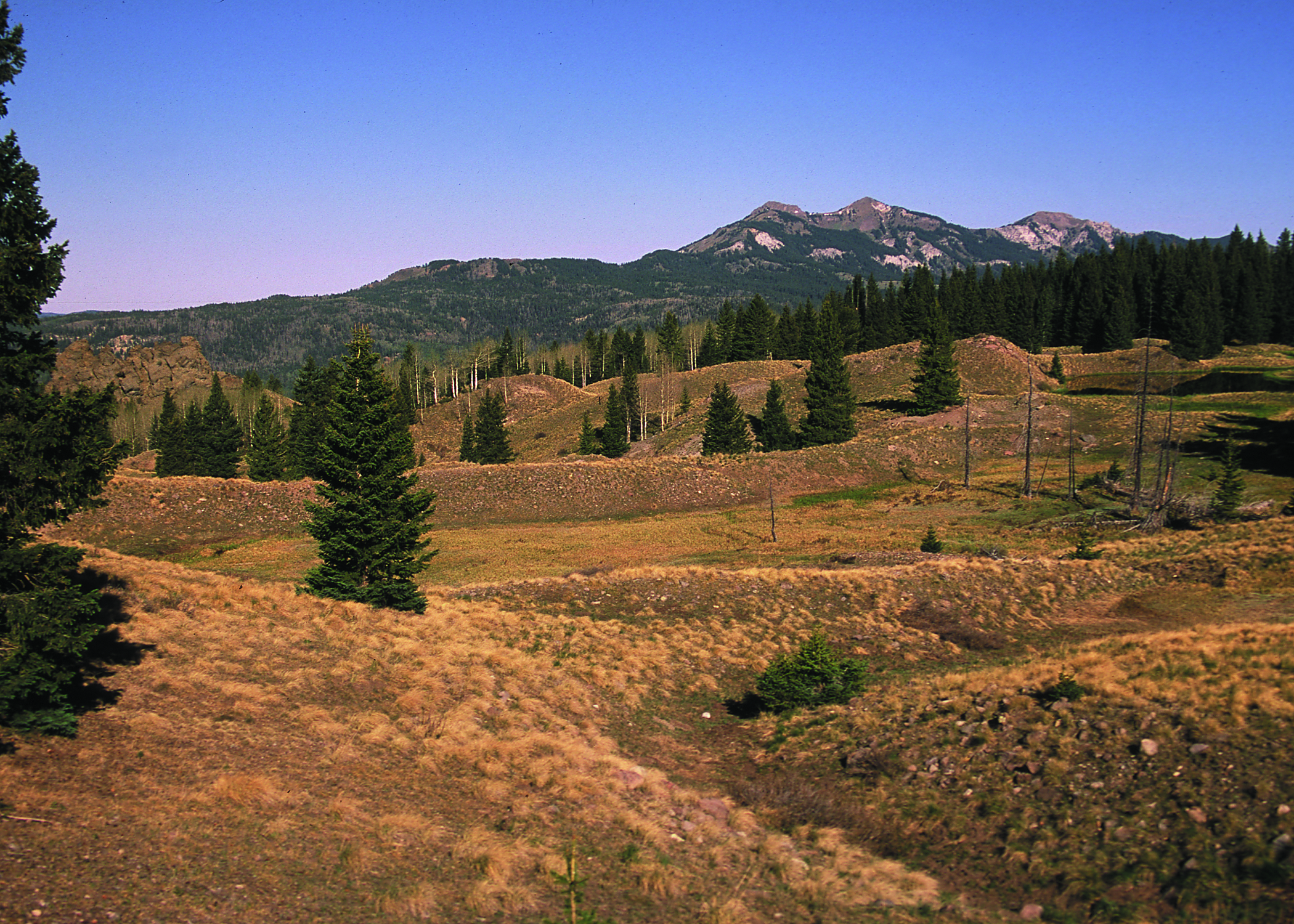
High country near Chama.

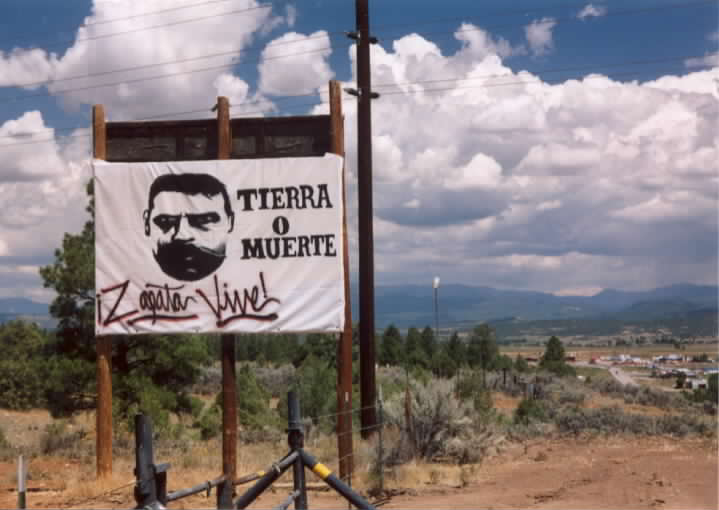
Land or Death! Zapata Lives! Emiliano Zapata was a revolutionary and agrarian reformer in Mexico.

The Tierra Amarilla Land Grant in northern New Mexico and southern Colorado consists of 594,516 acres (2,405.92 km^{2}) (929 sq miles) of mountainous land. The government of New Mexico awarded it to Manuel Martinez and his offspring in 1832. The grant was settled by Hispanics in the 1860s and the original inhabitants, the Ute Indians, were induced to leave. Settlers were given small plots, but most of the land in the grant area was designated as common land for the use of all the settlers and their descendants. After its conquest of New Mexico in 1846, the United States government upheld the validity of the grant, but subsequent actions by the U.S. did not protect the right to access common lands by the settlers. Politician and land speculator Thomas Catron, a member of the Santa Fe Ring, acquired nearly all the land by 1883 but later sold it to a development company. Access to the common lands of the grant by the Hispanic settlers and their descendants gradually disappeared as the common land became owned by Anglo ranchers, development companies, and speculators.

Legal disputes and protests, some with violence, between the descendants of the Hispanic settlers and speculators, ranchers, and developers about ownership of and access to land in the grant area were frequent and continued for more than 100 years. The best known incident was the 1967 occupation of the Rio Arriba county courthouse by Hispanic protesters asserting that grant land should be owned by descendants of the original settlers. Later, the Jicarilla Apache whose reservation borders the grant began purchasing land and in the 21st century became the largest landowner in the grant.

Scholar David Correia summed up a century of land grant controversies. The heirs and activists attempting to retain common lands for common usage as originally conceived in the land grants were "trapped in a legal system [of the United States] incapable of understanding common property."

== Geography ==
The Tierra Amarilla ("Yellow Land" in Spanish) Land Grant is about 40 mi (64 km) from north to south and 25 mi (40 km) east to west, occupying a large portion of Rio Arriba County, New Mexico and a small portion of Archuleta County Colorado. The land begins at the Rio Nutrias in the south and extends northward to the south San Juan Mountains of Colorado. Most of the land is mountainous. The lower elevations are semi-arid and vegetation is grassland and Pinyon pine woodland. Conifer forests are found at higher elevations. Elevations on the grant range from 6,653 ft (2,028 m) at the junction of the Nutrias with the Rio Chama in the south to 12,778 ft (3,895 m) at Banded Peak in Colorado. Two small towns are in the grant area: Tierra Amarilla (population 297 in 2020) and Chama (population 917). Chromo is a community at the edge of the grant in Colorado. The former town of El Vado, which in 1910 had a population of 1,000, is now beneath the waters of El Vado Lake.

== History ==
On July 20, 1832, the governor of New Mexico granted Manuel Martinez of Abiquiu, his eight offspring, and "some others" the land comprising the Tierra Amarilla Grant. Martinez was instructed to distribute small plots of land for residences and farming to settlers, but the majority was to be designated as common land for the use of all the residents of the grant. The document establishing the land grant did not mention that the Capote Utes occupied the land and were hostile to Hispanic settlement. Several attempts by Hispanics to found settlements on grant land failed due to Ute resistance. Manuel Martinez died in 1846 and his son Francisco became the leader of the grant owners.

In 1846, the United States conquered New Mexico. In 1848, the Treaty of Guadalupe Hidalgo guaranteed the right of Mexican citizens to retain ownership of their property. In 1860, the U.S. government "confirmed" (recognized as legal) the Tierra Amarilla grant. However, the U.S. decision was that Tierra Amarilla was a "private grant" to Francisco Martinez rather than the original New Mexican grant described as a "community grant" in which the land was to be owned jointly by a community of settlers. By virtue of being declared owner of Tierra Amarilla, Martinez became one of the largest land owners in the United States. The designation by the U.S. of Tierra Amarilla as a private grant to Martinez became the background for endless legal disputes in courts over the years as the descendants of settlers claimed that Tierra Amarilla was intended to be a grant to a community by the original grantor, the government of New Mexico.

In the late 1850s, the Jicarilla Apache began to move westward to join the Ute on grant lands. In 1868, the Utes gave up their claim to Tierra Amarilla land and began to relocate to a reservation in western Colorado. Clashes of settlers, militias, and the U.S. army with the Ute and Jicarilla continued until 1872 when the army and militias forced the last of the Utes to move from the grant to their reservation. In 1886 the U.S. established a reservation for the Jicarilla on the western boundary of the Tierra Amarilla Grant.

Between 1860 and 1865, with the Indian threat declining, Martinez encouraged the first permanent non-Indian settlement in the grant area by conveying small plots of land to 130 Hispanic families totaling about 1,000 people. He designated most of the land as common land to be used by all the settlers, a typical feature of Hispanic land practices in New Mexico. However, U.S. law regarded the common lands as owned by Martinez, thus coming into conflict with Hispanic practices. Meanwhile, Martinez's seven brothers and sisters each claimed one-eighth of the grant's common land and began selling it to land speculators. A flurry of speculation followed in which, by 1883, nearly all the Tierra Amarilla land was owned by Thomas B. Catron, an attorney and politician and a member of the notorious Santa Fe Ring of land speculators. Catron filed suit to establish his ownership and to obtain the right to evict the 2,000 settlers by then living on grant lands. His claim to ownership of the land was confirmed by an English-speaking court two hundred miles distant and did not become known to the Hispanic settlers on the grant for nearly seven years.

Despite the court ruling granting him ownership of the grant land, Catron did not attempt to evict settlers with titles (hijuelas) to the small plots of land allocated to them in the 1860s nor exclude them from access to common lands, but rather leased common land to outsiders for sheep grazing and harvesting timber. Legal complications concerning land ownership caused problems for him in attempting to sell the grant. In 1909 he sold it to Minnesota investors of the Arlington Land Company for the modest price of $500,000. The Arlington Company and subsequent owners sold much of the common property of the grant to Anglo ranchers and loggers. The Hispanic settlers on the grant lands thus lost access to the former common lands for their traditional uses of the land such as grazing, timber harvest, and firewood gathering.

=== A century of land disputes ===
The sale by investment companies of former common property led to violence and endless legal disputes. From 1919 to 1924 "night riders" associated with a shadowy organization called La Mano Negra ("Black Hand") cut fences, burned barns, and threatened the new owners of Tierra Amarilla grant land. The violence subsided until 1940 when fence cutting sporadically began again, continuing into the 1960s. Most of Tierra Amarilla was fenced and in the firm possession of large landowners by 1937 when a tenant farmer named Medardo Abeyta initiated legal action to reclaim access to the former common lands of the grant for heirs to the original Hispanic settlers. Abeyta founded an organization called La Corporacion de Abiquiu with the objective of removing private ranchers "from the property which had been fraudulently appropriated." He lost the court case.

The Alianza Federal de Mercedes (Federal Alliance of Land Grants), led by Reies Lopez Tijerina, was founded in 1963 with the objective of reclaiming the land given to Hispanic settlers by Spanish and Mexico land grants. The Alianza confronted ranchers and the United States Forest Service in its attempts to reclaim common land. The U.S. government demanded a list of the membership of the Alianza and arrested several members during a meeting. Those arrested were charged with unlawful assembly and extortion.

On June 5, 1967, Tijerina and 20 men occupied the Rio Arriba County courthouse in the town of Tierra Amarilla. They attempted to make a citizen's arrest of the district attorney, Alfonso Sanchez (who was not present), "to bring attention to the unscrupulous means by which government and Anglo settlers had usurped Hispanic land grant properties." An armed struggle in the courthouse ensued. Eulogio Salazar, a prison guard, was wounded and Daniel Rivera, a sheriff's deputy, was injured. Three hundred and fifty National Guardsman, armed with tanks and artillery, FBI agents, and New Mexico State Police expelled the occupiers and successfully pursued and arrested Tijerina but in his trial was declared innocent on December 13, 1968. He was later tried again and imprisoned briefly. The FBI continued to investigate land grant activists during the 1970s characterizing them as "domestic terrorists."

In 1969, Amador Flores, a resident of Tierra Amarilla, wrote himself a deed and paid real estate taxes for a 500 acres (200 ha) plot of land. He later built a house on the land. Not until 1985 was his ownership challenged by a development corporation, the Vista del Brazos. In 1988, a judge ordered his expulsion and arrest but 20 armed supporters defended him. The ACLU claimed Flores' constitutional right to due process had been violated, but Flores served about a month in jail for contempt of court. Flores' supporters occupied the land for 14 months until he reached a settlement with the corporation which awarded him 220 acres (89 ha) and cash.

In the 1970s land grant activists stopped plans to build an airport near the town of Tierra Amarilla to encourage tourism. One opponent of the airport said it would doom the residents to a life of "cleaning up the shit of tourists and hunters who have no respect for our culture and get mad when we speak Spanish."

In 2017, fifty years after the courthouse raid, described as "a watershed moment in New Mexico history," the movement to regain the Tierra Amarilla land by the heirs of the original settlers had subsided, although, according to the Santa Fe New Mexican, emotions were still raw. An irony of the lengthy dispute over Tierra Amarilla grant lands is that in the late 20th century the Jicarilla Apache, who had lived on the grant in the 19th century, began buying land with their gas and oil royalties. By 2013, the Jicarilla owned about one fourth of the grant lands, roughly 150,000 acres (61,000 ha).
