= Rio Nutrias =

Rio Nutrias Arroyo de las Nutrias, Rio de las Nutrias, Nutrias Creek
- Native name: Oyotepʼoe (Tewa); Pajapaana (Taos)

Location
- Country: United States
- State: New Mexico
- Region: Rio Arriba County
- City: Las Nutrias

Physical characteristics
- Source
  - location: North slope of Canjilón Mountain, Carson National Forest
  - coordinates: 36°36′10″N 106°20′20″W
  - elevation: 10,544 ft (3,214 m)
- Mouth: Confluence with the Rio Chama
  - coordinates: 36°33′10″N 106°42′57″W
  - elevation: 6,653 ft (2,028 m)

Basin features
- Tributaries
  - left: Terrero Creek, Canada del Policarpo

Rio Nutrias is a 35-mile-long (56 km) westward-flowing stream originating on the north slope of Canjilón Mountain in the Carson National Forest, in Rio Arriba County, New Mexico, United States. Rio Nutrias is a tributary to the Rio Chama which it joins about 3-mile-long (4.8 km) below El Vado Reservoir in Rio Arriba County, in northern New Mexico.

== History ==
Rio Nutrias is archaic sixteenth and seventeenth century Spanish (primarily rural Castilian) for "beavers river". On August 2, 1776 Francisco Silvestre Vélez de Escalante wrote in his diary, "...we halted in a small plain on the bank of another arroyo which is called Rio de las Nutrias, because, although it is of permanent and running water, apparently during all or most of the year it stands in pools where they say beavers breed." In his annotated 1900 translation of the diary of Francisco Garcés, Elliott Coues wrote in a footnote: "In proof of this use of nutrias for beavers I can cite a passage in Escalante's Diario. Doc. para Hist. Mex.,2d ser., i, 1854, p. 426: "Aqui tienen las nutrias hechos con palizades tales tanques, que representan a primera vista un rio mas que mediano - here have the beavers made with sticks such ponds that they look at first sight like a river larger than usual"; the reference being of course to the damming of the stream by these animals." In his dictionary of New Mexico and Southern Colorado Spanish, Rubén Cobos also translates the contemporary Spanish word nutria for otter, as meaning beaver in the archaic Spanish that persists in the region from the earliest settlers since 1598.

== Watershed and course ==
The Rio Nutrias passes through the village of Nutrias, not to be confused with Las Nutrias (Census designated place in Socorro County, NM) at the Highway 84 crossing. It enters Nutrias Canyon in its last couple miles before its confluence with the Rio Chama. This Rio Nutrias is not to be confused with the Rio Nutrias that is a tributary to the Rio San Antonio, or Rio Nutria that is a tributary to the Zuni River.

== Ecology ==
Not surprisingly, the river is excellent habitat for beavers (Castor canadensis).

== See also ==
- List of tributaries of the Rio Grande
- List of rivers of New Mexico
