= Spanish land grants in Florida =

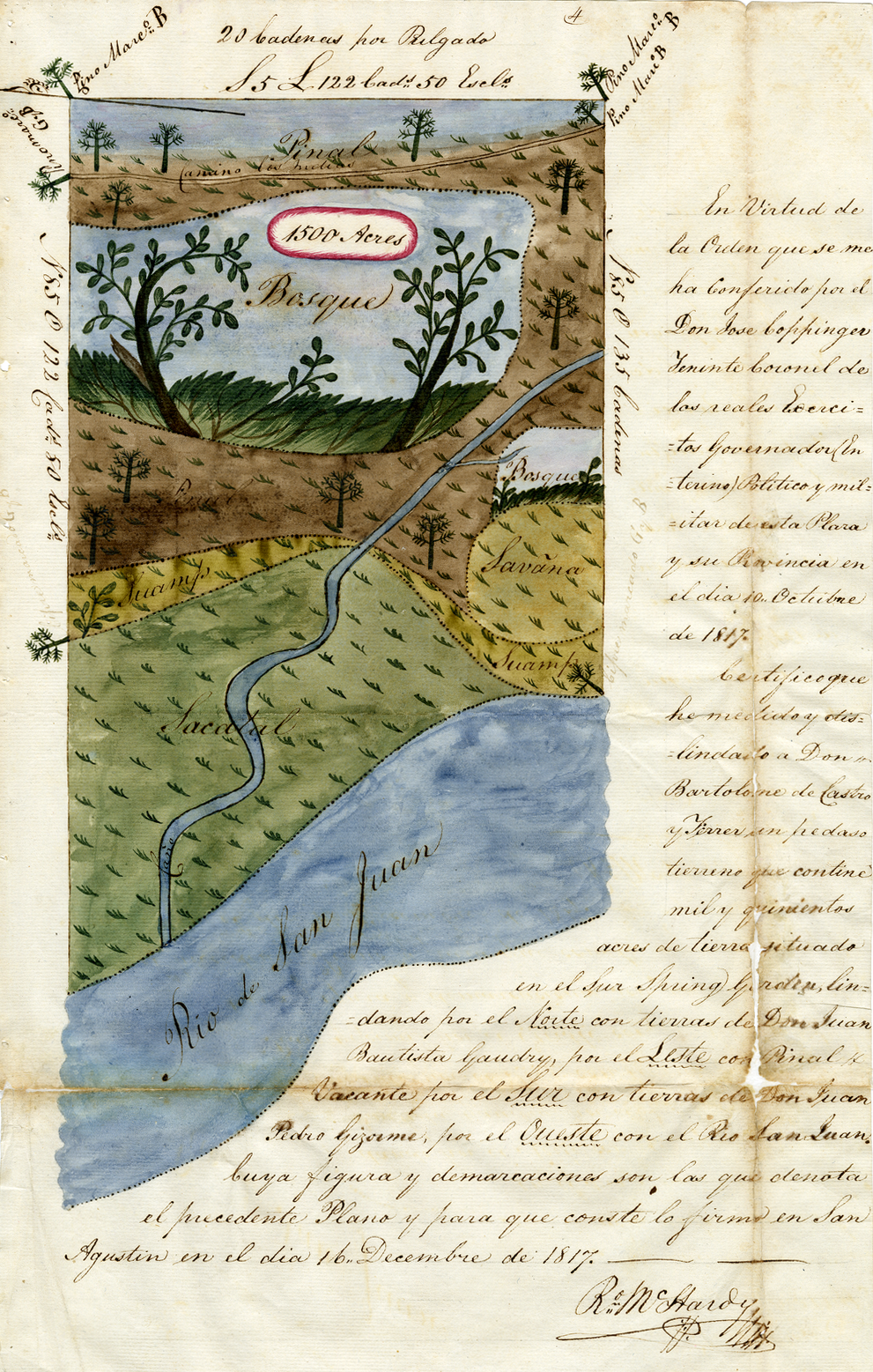
A single page from the Spanish land grant claim of Spanish nobleman John B. Gaudry, who founded a plantation near DeLeon Springs, Florida after he received a land grant in 1807. This is page 8 of 53, depicting a parcel of land adjacent to the St. Johns River.

Spanish land grants documented claims of land ownership when Spain ceded the territory of Florida to the United States in 1821. Under Spanish rule, land grants were offered to settlers beginning in 1790, to induce settlement of the colony. The United States agreed to honor these land grants when it gained control of the territory, provided that they were shown to be valid.

== History ==
In 1819, under the terms of the Adams-Onís Treaty, Spain ceded Florida to the United States in exchange for $5 million and the American renunciation of any claims on Texas that they might have from the Louisiana Purchase.

The United States required that residents had documented or testimonial proof of the validity of their land grants. Land commissions and other government bodies reviewed these claims, either confirming or denying their validity, and thus the ownership of the land. Dossiers were assembled for each land parcel, consisting of survey plats, deeds, wills, royal grants, and other documents supporting the claims.

== Publication ==
In 1942, the Spanish land grants were first published by the Work Projects Administration's (WPA) Florida Historical Records Survey. The records were transcribed into a five volumes, with an introduction written by historian Louise Biles Hill. More recently, the State Library and Archives of Florida published digitized copies of the land grants online.

== See also ==
- Land grants in New Mexico and Colorado
