= Elizabeth Martínez =

American Chicana feminist (1925–2021)

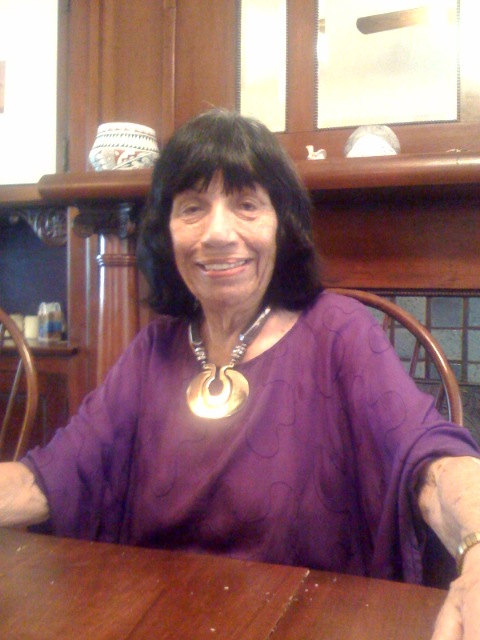
- Born: December 12, 1925; Washington, D.C., U.S.
- Died: June 29, 2021 (aged 95); San Francisco, California, U.S.
- Education: Swarthmore College
- Occupation: Author
- Writing career
- Notable work: 500 years of Chicano History in Pictures
- Movement: Chicana

Elizabeth "Betita" Martínez (December 12, 1925 – June 29, 2021) was an American Chicana feminist and a long-time community organizer, activist, author, and educator. She wrote numerous books and articles on different topics relating to social movements in the Americas. Her best-known work is the bilingual 500 years of Chicano History in Pictures, which later formed the basis for the educational video ¡Viva la Causa! 500 Years of Chicano History. Her work was hailed by Angela Y. Davis as comprising "one of the most important living histories of progressive activism in the contemporary era ... [Martínez is] inimitable ... irrepressible ... indefatigable."

== Life ==
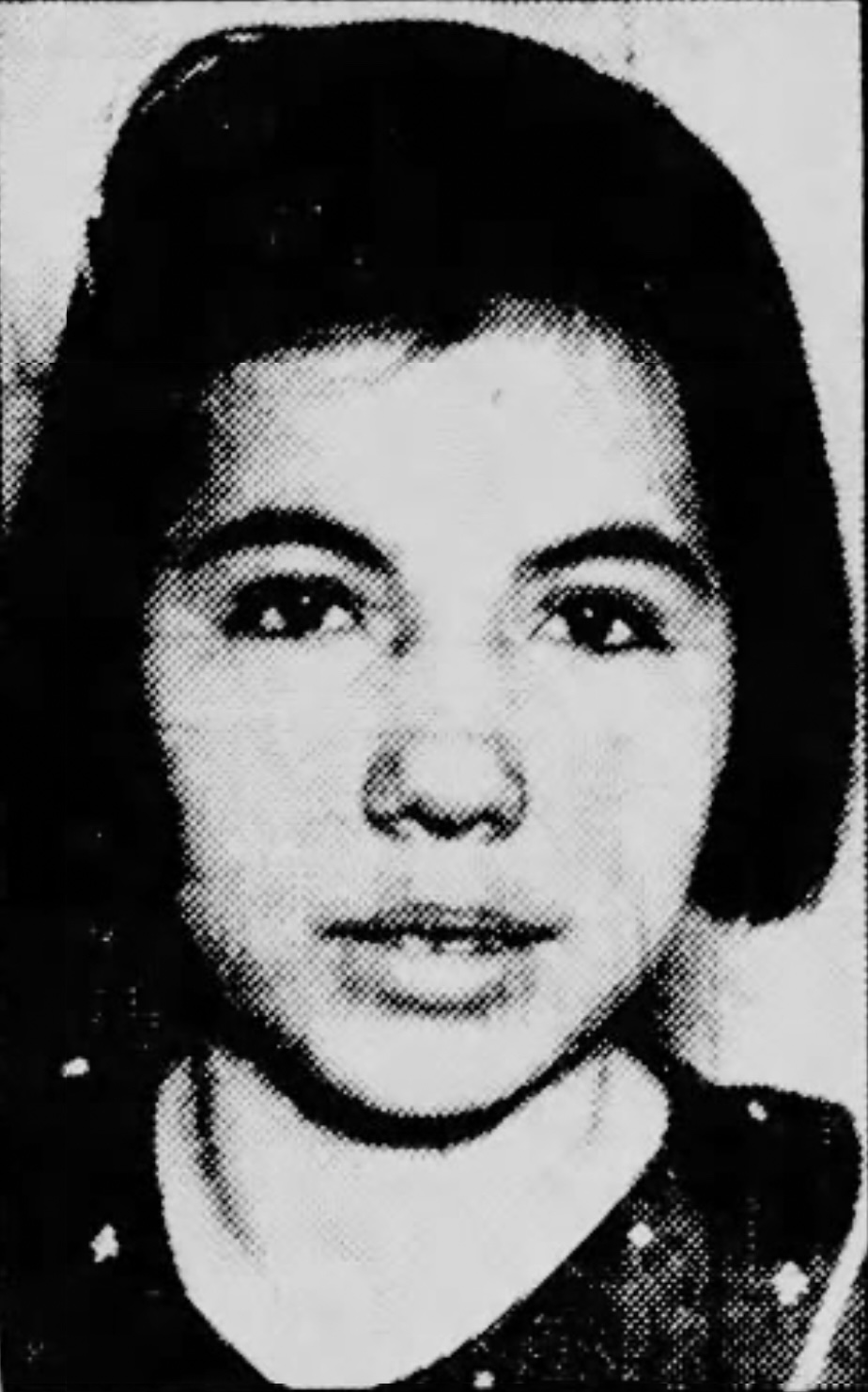
11-year-old Martinez, April 18, 1937

Martínez was the daughter of Manuel Guillermo Martinez and Ruth Philips Martínez. Her parents nicknamed her "Betita" for short. She grew up in a middle class predominately white neighborhood in Washington, D.C. because her father worked as a secretary in the Mexican Embassy. Her mother, Ruth Philips Martínez, received a master's degree from George Washington and taught advanced high school Spanish. Some of Martínez's first jobs included a clerk-typist at an insurance company, a waitress at an ice-cream store, and a copy girl at the Washington Post. Martínez was the first Latina student to graduate from Swarthmore College in 1946 where she received a Bachelor of Arts degree with Honors in History and Literature. When Martínez was twenty-three she married her first husband Leonard Berman and then divorced in 1952. She married her second husband Hans Koning in 1952 and they had their daughter Tessa Koning-Martínez together in 1954. In May 2000, Swarthmore awarded Martínez an honorary doctorate. Martínez worked for Simon & Schuster as an editor and for The Nation Magazine as Books and Arts Editor. Her daughter, Tessa, is an actress and co-founder of San Francisco's Latina Theater Lab. She died at the age of 95 in San Francisco due to vascular dementia.

== Activism ==
Martínez began her political work in the early 1950s. She worked in New York for the United Nations Secretariat as a researcher on colonialism and decolonization in Africa. Martinez was an activist who advocated for all different areas of life whether it be racism, poverty, or issues in military. During the 1960s, Martínez served full-time in the Civil Rights Movement with the Student Nonviolent Coordinating Committee (SNCC) in the South and as a coordinator of its New York office. Martínez edited the photo history book, The Movement, that raised funds for the SNCC. She was one of only two Latina women who worked for the SNCC. In 1968, she moved to New Mexico to start a newspaper to support the Alianza Federal de Mercedes. Along with lawyer Beverly Axelrod, Martínez thus founded the bilingual movement newspaper El Grito del Norte, which she worked on for five years. In 1973, she co-founded and directed the Chicano Communications Center, a barrio-based organizing and education project. Martínez edited the bilingual pictorial volume 500 Years of Chicano History that influenced her video Viva La Causa! that has been shown at film festivals and in classrooms across the country.

After moving to the Bay Area in 1976, Martínez organized around Latino community issues, taught Women's studies part-time, conducted anti-racist training workshops, and worked with youth groups. Martínez taught Ethnic Studies and Women's Studies at Hayward State University. Throughout her career Martínez wrote many articles. She wrote pieces for Z Magazine, Ms.Magazine, and many other publications. Martinez is credited for the creation of the term Oppression Olympics. Martínez ran for Governor of California on the Peace & Freedom Party ticket in 1982 and received many awards from student, community, and academic organizations, including Scholar of the Year 2000 by the National Association for Chicana and Chicano Studies. In 1997, she and Phil Hutchings co-founded the Institute for MultiRacial Justice, which "aims to strengthen the struggle against white supremacy by serving as a resource center to help build alliances among peoples of color and combat divisions." In 2004, she served on the advisory board for the group 2004 Racism Watch. She was also an adviser to the Catalyst Project, an anti-racist political education organization that focuses on white communities. She was also at one point affiliated with the Committees of Correspondence for Democracy and Socialism. Martínez died on June 29, 2021, at the age of 95.

== Selected publications ==
- 500 years of Chicana women's history = 500 años de historia de la mujer Chicanas (2008) ISBN 9780813542249
- De Colores Means All of Us: Latina Views for a Multi-Colored Century (1998) ISBN 0-89608-583-X
- 500 years of Chicano History in Pictures (1976) ISBN 978-0-9631123-0-9
- The Youngest Revolution: A Personal Report on Cuba (1969) ISBN 978-0-273-31434-9
- Letters from Mississippi (1964) ISBN 978-0-939010-71-4

Party political offices
Preceded by Marilyn Seals	Peace and Freedom Party Californian Gubernatorial candidate 1982 (lost)	Succeeded by Maria Elizabeth Muñoz
