= 1968 New Mexico gubernatorial election =

- November 5, 1968
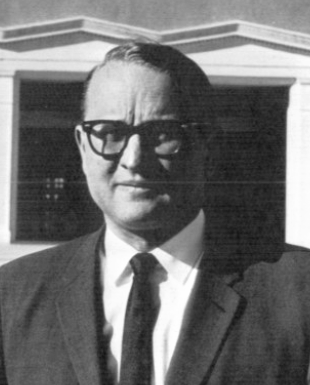

Nominee	David Cargo	Fabian Chavez Jr.
Party	Republican	Democratic
Popular vote	160,140	157,230
Percentage	50.20%	49.29%
- County results Cargo: 50–60% Chavez Jr.: 50–60% 60–70%
Governor before election
David Cargo
Republican
Elected Governor
David Cargo
Republican

The 1968 New Mexico gubernatorial election took place on November 5, 1968, in order to elect the Governor of New Mexico. Incumbent Republican David Cargo ran for reelection to a second term. This election was the last in which the governor was elected to a two-year term, instead of to a four-year term. As of 2022, this is the last time that Mora County and San Miguel County have voted for the Republican candidate.

== Primary election ==
=== Democratic primary ===
The Democratic primary was won by former state senator Fabian Chavez Jr.

==== Results ====
Democratic primary results
Party	Candidate	Votes	%
Democratic	Fabian Chavez Jr.	41,348	30.88%
Democratic	Bruce King	24,658	18.42%
Democratic	Calvin Horn	24,376	18.21%
Democratic	Mack Easley	21,436	16.01%
Democratic	Bobby M. Mayfield	19,528	14.59%
Democratic	Harry Stowers	2,543	1.90%
Total votes		133,889	100.00%

=== Republican primary ===
The Republican primary was won by Governor David Cargo. He narrowly defeated Clifford Hawley, a securities broker and former state representative who had previously challenged Cargo for the nomination in the 1966 election.

==== Results ====
Republican primary results
Party	Candidate	Votes	%
Republican	David Cargo (incumbent)	28,014	54.86%
Republican	Clifford J. Hawley	23,052	45.14%
Total votes		51,066	100.00%

=== People's Constitutional Party ===
Jose Maestes was the nominee of the People's Constitutional Party. He replaced Reies Tijerina, who was denied ballot access due to his status as a convicted felon.

== General election ==
=== Results ===
1968 New Mexico gubernatorial election
Party	Candidate	Votes	%	±%
Republican	David Cargo (incumbent)	160,140	50.20%	−1.53%
Democratic	Fabian Chavez Jr.	157,230	49.29%	+1.03%
People's Constitutional	Jose Maestes	1,540	0.48%	
	Scattering	65	0.02%	
Majority		2,910	0.91%	
Total votes		318,975	100.00%	
Republican hold		Swing	-2.56%	

=== Results by county ===
County	David Cargo Republican		Fabian Chavez Jr. Democratic		Jose Maestes PCP		Scattering Write-in		Margin		Total votes cast
County	#	%	#	%	#	%	#	%	#	%	Total votes cast
Bernalillo	50,801	50.41%	49,570	49.19%	410	0.41%	0	0.00%	1,231	1.22%	100,781
Catron	607	57.92%	437	41.70%	2	0.19%	2	0.19%	170	16.22%	1,048
Chaves	8,089	59.93%	5,385	39.90%	23	0.17%	0	0.00%	2,704	20.03%	13,497
Colfax	2,238	46.05%	2,611	53.72%	10	0.21%	1	0.02%	-373	-7.67%	4,860
Curry	5,291	54.41%	4,388	45.12%	45	0.46%	1	0.01%	903	9.29%	9,725
De Baca	506	47.47%	552	51.78%	6	0.56%	2	0.19%	-46	-4.32%	1,066
Doña Ana	9,182	47.23%	10,214	52.54%	45	0.23%	0	0.00%	-1,032	-5.31%	19,441
Eddy	7,589	52.08%	6,921	47.50%	59	0.40%	2	0.01%	668	4.58%	14,571
Grant	3,440	47.24%	3,822	52.49%	20	0.27%	0	0.00%	-382	-5.25%	7,282
Guadalupe	1,052	46.53%	1,193	52.76%	16	0.71%	0	0.00%	-141	-6.24%	2,261
Harding	432	56.62%	330	43.25%	1	0.13%	0	0.00%	102	13.37%	763
Hidalgo	673	45.91%	789	53.82%	3	0.20%	1	0.07%	-116	-7.91%	1,466
Lea	7,383	50.66%	7,114	48.81%	69	0.47%	8	0.05%	269	1.85%	14,574
Lincoln	1,641	54.18%	1,379	45.53%	8	0.26%	1	0.03%	262	8.65%	3,029
Los Alamos	3,386	54.20%	2,856	45.72%	5	0.08%	0	0.00%	530	8.48%	6,247
Luna	2,063	56.14%	1,599	43.51%	8	0.22%	5	0.14%	464	12.63%	3,675
McKinley	4,342	47.59%	4,630	50.75%	150	1.64%	2	0.02%	-288	-3.16%	9,124
Mora	1,189	52.94%	1,053	46.88%	4	0.18%	0	0.00%	136	6.06%	2,246
Otero	4,740	48.21%	5,053	51.39%	33	0.34%	6	0.06%	-313	-3.18%	9,832
Quay	2,158	54.72%	1,766	44.78%	19	0.48%	1	0.03%	392	9.94%	3,944
Rio Arriba	3,816	42.78%	4,948	55.46%	157	1.76%	0	0.00%	-1,132	-12.69%	8,921
Roosevelt	2,823	52.71%	2,520	47.05%	13	0.24%	0	0.00%	303	5.66%	5,356
San Juan	8,086	59.25%	5,413	39.66%	140	1.03%	9	0.07%	2,673	19.59%	13,648
San Miguel	4,140	50.08%	4,066	49.19%	60	0.73%	0	0.00%	74	0.90%	8,266
Sandoval	1,630	34.61%	3,030	64.34%	49	1.04%	0	0.00%	-1,400	-29.73%	4,709
Santa Fe	8,788	45.52%	10,427	54.01%	75	0.39%	15	0.08%	-1,639	-8.49%	19,305
Sierra	1,456	55.36%	1,158	44.03%	16	0.61%	0	0.00%	298	11.33%	2,630
Socorro	1,882	44.76%	2,315	55.05%	8	0.19%	0	0.00%	-433	-10.30%	4,205
Taos	2,908	47.02%	3,260	52.72%	16	0.26%	0	0.00%	-352	-5.69%	6,184
Torrance	1,276	52.23%	1,156	47.32%	3	0.12%	8	0.33%	120	4.91%	2,443
Union	1,152	54.91%	939	44.76%	6	0.29%	1	0.05%	213	10.15%	2,098
Valencia	5,381	45.69%	6,336	53.80%	61	0.52%	0	0.00%	-955	-8.11%	11,778
Total	160,140	50.20%	157,230	49.29%	1,540	0.48%	65	0.02%	2,910	0.91%	318,975

==== Counties that flipped from Democratic to Republican ====
- Curry
- Eddy
- Lea
- Luna
- Quay
- Roosevelt
- Union

==== Counties that flipped from Republican to Democratic ====
- Socorro
- Valencia
