= People's Constitutional Party =

Political party from New Mexico, United States

- Leader: Pedro Arechuleta; Moises Morales
- Founder: Supporters of Reies Tijerina
- Founded: 1968
- Dissolved: 1971
- Membership (1970): 169
- Ideology: Chicano nationalism
- Political position: Left-wing

The People's Constitutional Party was a political party active in the U.S. state of New Mexico during the late 1960s and early 1970s.

== History ==
The party was formed in 1968 by supporters of Reies Tijerina and his Alianza Federal de Mercedes, who was active in the Chicano Movement and advocated for land grants in New Mexico to be restored to descendants of their original Spanish and Mexican owners. The party, which was led by Pedro Arechuleta and Moises Morales, called for "bilingual education, civilian police review boards, and an increase in welfare payments." Due to his status as a convicted felon, Tijerina was disqualified as a gubernatorial candidate in the 1968 election and was replaced by Jose Maestes. The party ran several candidates in the 1968 and 1970 elections, but none were successful, or even received more than 2% of the vote, and it dissolved shortly afterward, largely due to Tijerina's imprisonment a year prior. In May 1970, the People's Constitutional Party had 169 registered members.

== See also ==
- Raza Unida Party
