= 1966 New Mexico gubernatorial election =

- November 8, 1966
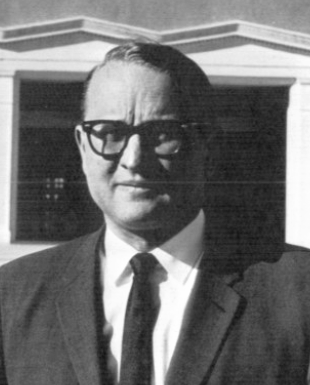

Nominee	David Cargo	Gene Lusk
Party	Republican	Democratic
Popular vote	134,625	125,587
Percentage	51.73%	48.26%
- County results Cargo: 50–60% 60–70% Lusk: 50–60% 60–70% 70–80%
Governor before election
Jack M. Campbell
Democratic
Elected Governor
David Cargo
Republican

The 1966 New Mexico gubernatorial election took place on November 8, 1966, in order to elect the Governor of New Mexico. Due to term limits, incumbent Democrat Jack M. Campbell could not run for reelection to a third term. Republican David Cargo defeated Democrat Gene Lusk in a close race.

== Primary election ==
=== Democratic primary ===
The Democratic primary was won by former state senator Gene Lusk.

==== Results ====
New Mexico Democratic gubernatorial primary, 1966
Party	Candidate	Votes	%
Democratic	Gene Lusk	85,211	59.86%
Democratic	John Burroughs	57,143	40.14%
Total votes		142,354	100.00%

=== Republican primary ===
The Republican primary was won by state representative David Cargo. Cargo narrowly defeated fellow state representative Clifford Hawley. Hawley would again run for the Republican nomination for governor in 1968.

==== Results ====
New Mexico Republican gubernatorial primary, 1966
Party	Candidate	Votes	%
Republican	David Cargo	17,836	51.81%
Republican	Clifford J. Hawley	16,588	48.19%
Total votes		34,424	100.00%

== General election ==
=== Results ===
1966 New Mexico gubernatorial election
Party	Candidate	Votes	%	±%
Republican	David Cargo	134,625	51.73%	+11.95%
Democratic	Gene Lusk	125,587	48.26%	−11.95%
	Scattering	20	0.01%	
Majority		9,038	3.47%	
Total votes		260,232	100.00%	
Republican gain from Democratic		Swing	+23.90%	

=== Results by county ===
County	David Cargo Republican		Gene Lusk Democratic		Margin		Total votes cast
County	#	%	#	%	#	%	Total votes cast
Bernalillo	50,274	63.08%	29,431	36.92%	20,843	26.15%	79,705
Catron	555	53.57%	481	46.43%	74	7.14%	1,036
Chaves	6,380	53.31%	5,582	46.64%	798	6.67%	11,967 (Note: Includes 5 write-in votes)
Colfax	1,719	40.47%	2,529	59.53%	-810	-19.07%	4,248
Curry	3,624	47.19%	4,055	52.81%	-431	-5.61%	7,679
De Baca	354	38.60%	563	61.40%	-209	-22.79%	917
Doña Ana	6,568	48.52%	6,969	51.48%	-401	-2.96%	13,537
Eddy	5,297	39.27%	8,191	60.72%	-2,894	-21.45%	13,489 (Note: Includes 1 write-in vote)
Grant	1,969	32.49%	4,091	67.51%	-2,122	-35.02%	6,060
Guadalupe	1,025	46.17%	1,195	53.83%	-170	-7.66%	2,220
Harding	391	52.20%	358	47.80%	33	4.41%	749
Hidalgo	346	29.32%	834	70.68%	-488	-41.36%	1,180
Lea	4,226	39.20%	6,553	60.79%	-2,327	-21.59%	10,780
Lincoln	1,423	56.63%	1,090	43.37%	333	13.25%	2,513
Los Alamos	2,646	54.75%	2,185	45.21%	461	9.54%	4,833 (Note: Includes 2 write-in votes)
Luna	1,161	38.78%	1,833	61.22%	-672	-22.44%	2,994
McKinley	3,069	47.63%	3,375	52.37%	-306	-4.75%	6,444
Mora	1,195	51.09%	1,144	48.91%	51	2.18%	2,339
Otero	3,159	43.63%	4,082	56.37%	-923	-12.75%	7,241
Quay	1,556	43.83%	1,994	56.17%	-438	-12.34%	3,550
Rio Arriba	3,209	39.85%	4,843	60.15%	-1,634	-20.29%	8,052
Roosevelt	1,838	48.66%	1,939	51.34%	-101	-2.67%	3,777
San Juan	5,734	53.83%	4,918	46.17%	816	7.66%	10,652
San Miguel	4,134	53.29%	3,623	46.71%	511	6.59%	7,757
Sandoval	1,505	39.99%	2,257	59.98%	-752	-19.98%	3,763
Santa Fe	7,945	48.69%	8,369	51.29%	-424	-2.60%	16,318 (Note: Includes 4 write-in votes)
Sierra	1,349	54.93%	1,106	45.03%	243	9.89%	2,456
Socorro	1,963	51.50%	1,849	48.50%	114	2.99%	3,812
Taos	2,670	46.98%	3,010	52.96%	-340	-5.98%	5,683 (Note: Includes 3 write-in votes)
Torrance	1,227	51.99%	1,131	47.92%	96	4.07%	2,360
Union	893	44.54%	1,112	55.46%	-219	-10.92%	2,005
Valencia	5,221	51.61%	4,895	48.39%	326	3.22%	10,116
Total	134,625	51.73%	125,587	48.26%	9,038	3.47%	260,232

==== Counties that flipped from Democratic to Republican ====
- Bernalillo
- Catron
- Chaves
- Los Alamos
- Mora
- San Juan
- San Miguel
- Sierra
- Socorro
- Torrance
- Valencia
