= Gene Lusk =

American politician (1920–1969)

Member of the New Mexico Senate
- In office 1953–1961

Personal details
- Born: June 4, 1920 Lovington, New Mexico, U.S.
- Died: February 14, 1969 (aged 48) Carlsbad, New Mexico, U.S.
- Party: Democratic
- Children: 3
- Parent: Georgia Lee Lusk (mother)
- Education: University of Michigan

Military service
- Branch/service: United States Army
- Years of service: 1942–1946

Thomas Eugene Lusk (June 4, 1920 – February 14, 1969) was an American politician from the state of New Mexico.

== Early life and education ==
Lusk was born in 1920 on a ranch near Lovington, New Mexico, to Dolph and Georgia Lee Lusk, who served one term as U.S. Representative. He graduated from the New Mexico Military Institute in 1937 and the University of Michigan in 1948.

== Career ==
Lusk began practicing law in 1949. Lusk also served in the United States Army from 1942 and 1946.

In 1952, Lusk was elected to the New Mexico Senate, serving as majority leader from 1957 until 1959. In 1960, he ran for the United States House of Representatives, but lost in the Democratic primary to Joseph Montoya. He ran for Governor of New Mexico in 1966 and defeated John Burroughs in the primary, but narrowly lost the general election to David Cargo. He served as a delegate to the 1968 Democratic National Convention.

== Personal life ==
Lusk married Phyllis Raymond in 1943. They had three children: Ann, Allison, and Bill.

Lusk died from a self-inflicted gunshot wound on February 14, 1969, while visiting his wife in the hospital.

Party political offices
Preceded by Jack M. Campbell	Democratic nominee for Governor of New Mexico; 1966	Succeeded by Fabian Chavez Jr.
