= Reies Tijerina =

American activist (1926–2015)

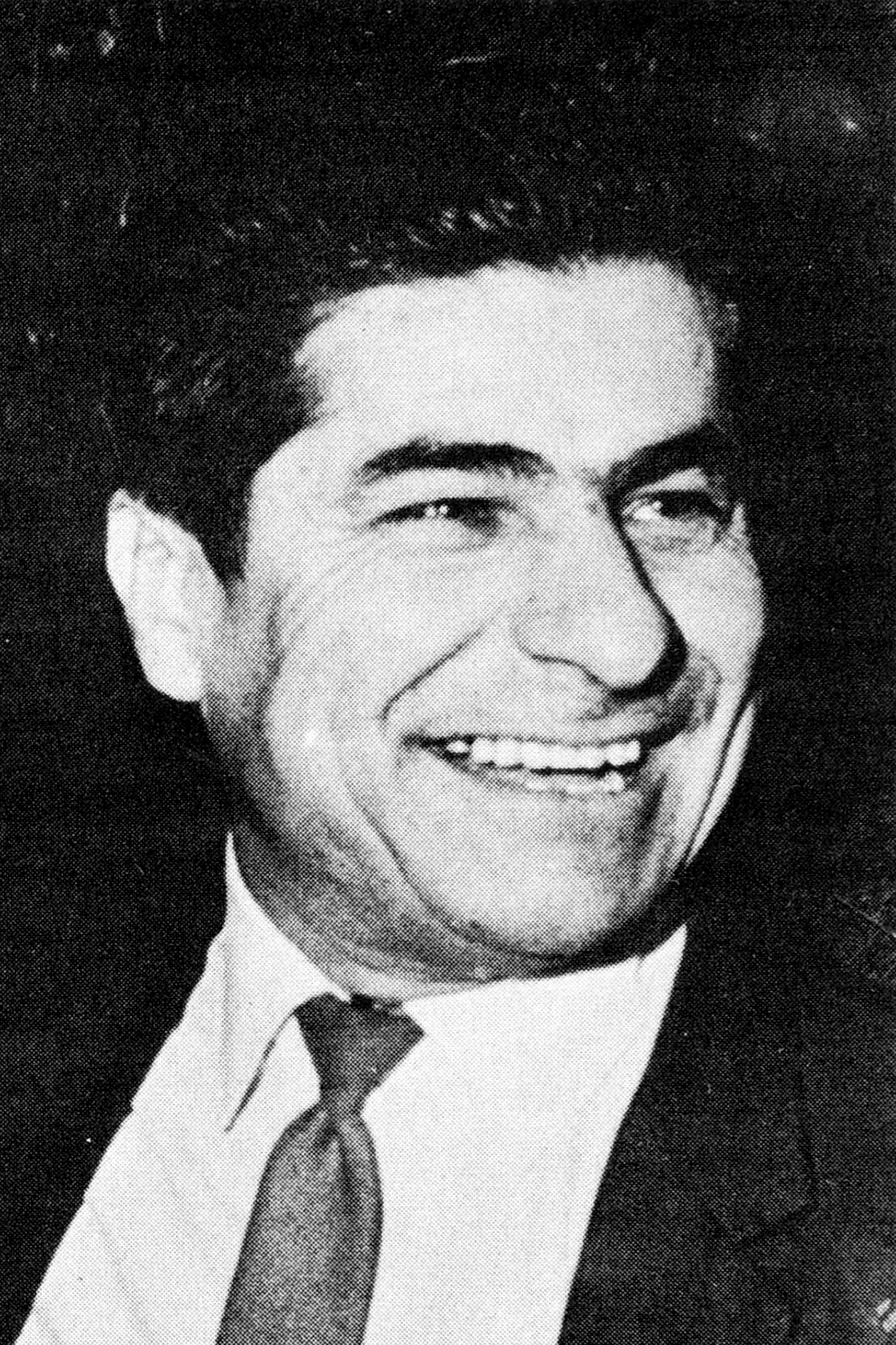
Tijerina in 1968

Reies López Tijerina (September 21, 1926 – January 19, 2015), was an American activist who led a struggle in the 1960s and 1970s to restore New Mexican land grants to the descendants of their Spanish colonial and Mexican owners. As a vocal spokesman for the rights of Hispanos and Mexican Americans, he became a major figure of the early Chicano Movement (although he preferred "Indohispano" as a name for his people) and founded the Alianza Federal de Mercedes. As an activist, he worked in community education and organization, media relations, and land reclamations. He became famous and infamous internationally for his 1967 armed raid on the Tierra Amarilla courthouse located on the Tierra Amarilla Land Grant whose lands, originally designated for Hispanic settlers, had largely been acquired by Anglo ranchers and land developers.

== Early life ==
Born in Falls City, Texas in 1926, Tijerina spent several years as a pastor starting in 1950 and later as an itinerant preacher.

== Career ==
=== Kingdom of God ===
In 1956, Tijerina and 17 families of his followers sought to purchase land in Texas on which to create their version of the Kingdom of God. Finding Texas land too expensive, they opted for 160 acres (647,497 square meters) in the Southern Arizona desert, which they bought with $1,400 in pooled funds. Situated just north of the Papago Tohono O'odham Indian reservation, the land was secluded and undeveloped, the perfect conditions for a community seeking to remove itself from the "vanity and corruption" of the cities. They especially sought to protect their children from the influence of public schooling.

At first, the families, referred to as "los Bravos" or the "Heralds of Peace", lived under trees, but they soon dug themselves subterranean shelters, covering them with automobile hoods recovered from garbage dumps outside the cities of Casa Grande and Eloy. Tijerina obtained a permit from the Arizona Department of Education to construct a school and to educate their children. He and the other men spent three months building the schoolhouse, only for it to be burned to the ground.

The members of the colony made friends with the neighboring communities, especially African Americans and Native Americans, particularly the Pima Indians. Tijerina soon found himself thrust into the role of bail bondsman for these minority communities. Officials from the Pima County school board began visiting the Valley of Peace early in the year, encouraging the settlers to send their children to public schools. Citing the recent rape and murder of a local eight-year-old girl who was waiting for the bus, Tijerina and the other parents requested police protection for their children, which was denied. As a result, the commune-dwellers retained the right to educate their own children.

On April 18, 1956, Tijerina delivered his daughter Ira de Alá, the first person to be born in the colony. He chose the name Ira de Alá, literally "Wrath of Allah", because he "knew that if there was a just God, he had to be angry and unhappy with those that managed our government and religion here on Earth". During the first year, a jet crashed on the property. Valley of Peace residents reported the crash, and officials came to take away the remains but neglected to ask about the condition of the property or the residents. Not long after the crash, a group of Anglo-American youths rode their horses over the tops of the settlers' subterranean homes, damaging them. Thinking that the pranks were but youthful mischief, the commune members simply repaired their dwellings and made no complaint. But shortly thereafter, they returned from work in the cotton fields to discover two residences destroyed by fire. Tijerina and two other men went to file a report with Sheriff Lawrence White. But when White found out the direction from which the horse tracks came, he refused to investigate. Don Pelkam, an FBI agent stationed in Casa Grande who had investigated the crash, also refused to investigate, claiming that the arson had occurred outside his jurisdiction.

Shortly after his daughter was born, a storm flooded the Valley of Peace. Devastated by his losses, Tijerina could not sleep. During the night he had a vision:

A man landed near my subterranean home. Behind him another man landed to his right ... Then a third ... landed nearby. The three sat over something that appeared to be a cloud. They spoke to me. They told me they came from far away, that they were coming for me, and they would take me to an old ancient regime.

My wife said, "Why my husband? Aren't there others?"

The three responded, "There is no other in the world that can do this job. We have searched the earth and only he can do this." At that moment, I interrupted and I asked, "What job?"

They responded, "Secretary."

— Reies Lopez Tijerina, They Called Me "King Tiger": My Struggle for the Land and Our Rights

Following the vision, Tijerina felt that his life had purpose and direction, and his experience, which he interpreted as divine, gave him an unwavering conviction.

In the early 1950s, Tijerina was first encouraged to divert his religious energy into politics. After a sermon in Dallas one day, a man invited him home for lunch. As Tijerina recalls, "He said to my face, 'I don't like preachers, they take advantage of the people. What I think you should do is quit talking religion. What the Spanish-American people need is a Spanish-American politician, you may be that ... you should study law and history and help your people.'" In June 1956, Tijerina and a few bravos went to Monero, New Mexico, to visit a community that had previously welcomed him. There he learned about land grants, a controversial issue regarding Hispanic property rights. Zebedeo Martínez, Zebedeo Valdez, and other elderly men, all members of the Brotherhood of Jesus, shared the story of how their families were dispossessed of their lands. The next day, they took Tijerina's group to Chama, Tierra Amarilla, and Ensenada to meet with other unhappy heirs.

Tijerina empathized with their plight, and offered to do what he could to help them, on the condition that they unite to "re-gather the strength that the Anglos had taken from" them. But when he discovered that they held no titles to the land, having been turned over to Governor William Anderson Pile in the late nineteenth century, he resolved to go to Mexico to study the issue.

He left in the fall of 1956 and stayed in Mexico until the new year, researching at the General National Archive and meeting with lawyers and other influential people. One of the most important documents he studied was the Laws of the Indies, which had governed the American portion of the Spanish Empire for more than 300 years. Another was a re-drafted version of the Treaty of Guadalupe Hidalgo containing a protocol that guaranteed land grants to descendants of the original grantees, which he obtained in the Tepito barrio for twenty-five cents. On this trip to Mexico, Tijerina realized that the biggest obstacle to his success was "the fear the Anglo had placed in [the land grant-heirs'] hearts through their foreign education." While education had been a key factor in the founding of the Valley of Peace, it now took on an even more important dimension in the life of Tijerina and in the struggle for the land.

In January 1957, officials from the Arizona State Department of Education threatened Tijerina and the other parents with jail time if they did not send their children to public school. Even when confronted with the Supreme Court cases defending the right to home-schooling, the officials would not back down. Tijerina claims to have later found out that the real reason for the harassment was "Rockefeller money was planning to build a model city about a mile from the Valley of Peace." As a last resort, Tijerina took his case to the Phoenix press. However, neither of the two major papers covered the story of the persecution.

On March 19 of the same year, Tijerina was charged with the grand theft of six feed-trailer wheels. The case was thrown out for lack of evidence, but the next month, he was charged with another theft, this time for hardware discovered in the Valley of Peace. During the investigation, officials found out that Margarito Tijerina, who had joined the commune, was wanted in Indiana and took him into custody.

Reies was accused of being the getaway driver during a failed attempt to free his brother from Pinal County Jail. During a recess at his hearing, he left the courthouse, becoming a fugitive.

Tijerina and the other families with children sought refuge in New Mexico. They arrived in the ghost town of Gobernador in early 1957 and took refuge in a church. Desperate for food, Tijerina and his brother Margarito set out to find help. They met Don Manuel Trujillo, a local rancher. Tijerina later called Trujillo his "first and best teacher on the question of land grants in New Mexico." In New Mexico, Tijerina got the idea to organize the heirs of the New Mexico land grants into a corporation that could compete with "the great corporations of the Anglos". But realizing that survival came first, Tijerina and two other bravos returned to the Valley of Peace to look for work. They were arrested and imprisoned in Florence, Arizona for ninety days. Margarito, who had violated the conditions of his parole, was not released. While in prison, Margarito asked Tijerina to help the wife and child of a fellow inmate. Commune members clothed and fed the woman and child, and Tijerina secured the man's release. Two days later, he was imprisoned and charged with attempting to free his brother. Released on bond, his court-appointed attorney urged him to flee the state for his own safety. After consulting with the other families, Tijerina decided to risk losing the Valley of Peace and flee.

Tijerina spent the next seven years as a fugitive in Arizona, New Mexico, Texas, and Mexico. By this time he had seven children and had to leave them with his wife. While on the run, Tijerina continued to research communal land rights, the U.S. Constitution, and the rights guaranteed by the Treaty of Guadalupe Hidalgo. The biggest weakness he saw in U.S. law was its failure to provide specific protection for the family.

In May 1958, he was invited to speak in front of a group of land grant heirs in Chama, New Mexico. During his speech, he was attacked and struck over the head with a club. In the ensuing melee, Tijerina was removed to safety and his brother, Anselmo, was arrested for assaulting Tijerina's attacker.

In 1959, Tijerina went to an archive in Guadalajara, Jalisco. When he requested the documents concerning the New Mexican land claims, the attendant was unable to locate them. His nephew from Pleasanton Texas then hid the files in his house in the closet. The last person to access the documents was an American commissioned by the Mexican government to convert them to microfilm.

The authorities came close to apprehending Tijerina many times, and he was maligned in the local press as a "Communist" and a "bandit". In September 1959, he organized a strike in Shamrock, Texas, in protest of unequal working conditions for Mexican laborers. When thus confronted, the cotton farmer gave in to the strikers' demands.

Tijerina secured housing in Ensenada, New Mexico, where he came into further contact with members of the Brotherhood of Jesus, who told him of Thomas B. Catron's leadership of the Santa Fe Ring, a group of ranchers, and government officials who systematically dispossessed the land grantees and their heirs of their claims from 1848 until 1904. He also became aware that the federal government itself had claimed portions of the Tierra Amarilla grant in the name of the Forest Service.

When Tijerina's brother Margarito was released from prison in Michigan City, Tijerina took advantage of the opportunity to meet with Elijah Muhammad. They met daily over the course of a week, during which time they discussed the need for unity among the minority groups of the United States.

On December 12, 1959, Tijerina sent a letter signed by some eighty families asking President Eisenhower to investigate the land claims. Two months later, they received a cold response. Having failed to receive redress of their grievance from one signatory of the Treaty of Guadalupe Hidalgo, Tijerina and his supporters turned to the government of Mexico. His goal was to deliver a 500-signature petition, historical documents, and legal opinions to President Adolfo López Mateos. Arriving in Mexico City, Tijerina made the acquaintance of the labor leader Vicente Lombardo Toledano, who listened patiently to the story of the struggle of "the forgotten community" over the land, and offered to do what he could for the price of $25,000. Having failed to reach López Mateos via Toledano, he turned to other acquaintances in the religious and academic communities. But before he could meet with the president, his documents were stolen during a visit to the post office. Devastated, Tijerina returned to the United States, along with his nephew Johnny Tijerina.

He returned to Mexico in late 1961 and succeeded in obtaining an audience with General Lázaro Cárdenas. The General offered his support, but warned auspiciously, "if you are not willing to see blood spilt, forget about all of this."

=== La Alianza ===
In August 1962, while living in Albuquerque, Tijerina drafted the first plan of the Alianza Federal de Mercedes. A letter calling for an Alianza of Pueblos and Pobladores (Alliance of Towns and Settlers) followed soon afterwards in October. La Alianza, as it became known, was officially incorporated on February 2, 1963, the 115th anniversary of the signing of the Treaty of Guadalupe Hidalgo. Tijerina was elected president and Eduardo Chávez was elected vice-president. The Alianza sought "to organize and acquaint the heirs of all Spanish land-grants covered by the Guadalupe Hidalgo Treaty" with their rights. The group further sought to foster pride the heritage of the Native New Mexicans and to command Anglo respect on their behalf. The Alianza began publishing a newspaper, and Tijerina wrote a weekly column for The News Chieftain. In June 1963, the Alianza sent letters to the governments of the United States and Mexico reminding them of their obligations under the Treaty of Guadalupe Hidalgo.

At the same time, Tijerina's fugitive lifestyle was taking its toll on his family life. He and his wife discussed divorce as a possible solution to their problems at the beginning of 1963, which she obtained later in the year.

It was also at this time that the local press gave Tijerina the nickname of Don Quixote, belittling his quest to restore the property rights of land grant heirs. By 1964 the Alianza had over 6,000 members; a year later, its membership had increased to 14,000. At its 1966 convention, the Alianza counted 20,000 people in its fold. Nevertheless, the Alianza's activities raised the ire of many New Mexican Hispanics, who saw Tijerina as an outsider who had come to upset the status quo. For example, U.S. Senator Joseph Montoya, spoke out against Tijerina and the Alianza, stating that "the last thing the Spanish-speaking need is agitation, rabble-rousing, or creation of false hopes," and characterized Tijerina as an "outsider who sparked violence and set back racial relations and an enemy of the United States."

To promote the cause of the Alianza, Tijerina began planning an automobile caravan to Mexico. While laying the groundwork in Mexico, he was detained and deported by Mexican officials. The insult crushed the hopes of many Alianzistas that Mexico would bring their case to the United Nations, and led Tijerina to suspect that the FBI was behind the deportation.

On April 1, 1965, Tijerina began broadcasting the daily radio program "The Voice of Justice". The 5,000 watt station, KABQ-FM, provided "the best medium to reach the community about the issue of the land." In August 1965, he adapted the show to a televised format.

Tijerina's single status had begun to cause him trouble as the leader of a family-based organization, but his attempts to reconcile with his wife failed. On August 8, 1965, he met Patricia, and the two were wed on September 25.

=== March on Santa Fe and the taking of San Joaquín ===
In 1966, Tijerina went to Spain and learned a great deal about the Spanish laws governing land grants. When he returned, he planned a July 4 protest march from Albuquerque to Santa Fe called "the Spanish American March for a Redress of Grievances." On the march, some white New Mexicans shouted epithets at them. Some even shot at them. Arriving in the capital, they met with the governor and delivered a written demand for an investigation into the theft of the communal land holdings.

Failed attempts to petition the government for redress of grievances led the Alianza to take direct action. In October 1966, Alianza members occupied part of the "Echo Amphitheater Park," part of the Carson National Forest that had been part of the San Joaquín del Río de Chama grant. The Alianza set up and proclaimed the "Republic of San Joaquín del Río de Chama." Descendants of the original settlers elected officials, and, according to some accounts, issued visas to passing tourists. When two forest rangers attempted to remove the occupiers, they were arrested by the newly elected marshals. The rangers were tried, convicted of trespassing, given suspended sentences, and released along with their trucks.

After five days, the claimants turned themselves in. Of the 300 people involved, only five—Tijerina, his brother Cristóbal and three other Alianza members—were charged with assault on the Rangers and converting government property to personal use. Bail in the amount of $5,000 each was imposed.

=== Courthouse raid ===
Released on bond, Tijerina called a meeting of the Alianza in the village of Coyote. On June 3, 1967, District Attorney Alfonso Sánchez ordered police to disband the meeting, alleging that the Alianza was inspired by communists and outside agitators, and had the state police set up roadblocks to arrest Alianza members. During the meeting, eleven Aliancistas were taken into custody. Tijerina and several members managed to avoid arrest and met near the town of Canjilón, where the Alianza condemned the arrests as illegal acts.

On June 5, 1967, Tijerina led an armed raid on the Rio Arriba County courthouse in Tierra Amarilla, New Mexico, to free the imprisoned members and to place a citizen's arrest on Sánchez for violating the Alianza's right of peaceable assembly in Coyote two days prior. Unbeknownst to Tijerina, the county judge had already freed the imprisoned members while Sánchez himself was not present at the courthouse that day. In the ensuing confrontation, Eulogio Salazar, a prison guard, was shot and Daniel Rivera, a sheriff's deputy, was badly injured. The Aliancistas headed for the mountains of Canjilón with two abductees.

Lieutenant Governor of New Mexico E. Lee Francis ordered the National Guard out as well as a large array of law enforcement agencies, including state police from all the northern counties, local sheriffs and unofficial posses, Jicarilla Apache police, and cattle inspectors, to arrest all members of the Alianza involved in the incident, thus launching the biggest manhunt in New Mexico history. In a crude translation of his name, the press dubbed Tijerina "King Tiger". The Ballad of Río Arriba, a corrido based on the raid written by Roberto Martínez, received heavy radio play. The next Monday, Tijerina surrendered to authorities in Albuquerque and was charged with fifty-four criminal counts including kidnapping and armed assault.

The courthouse raid caught the attention of the national press and brought Tijerina's regional land grant crusade into the larger Chicano and civil rights movements. He met with activists from around the country such as Rodolfo Gonzales, the founder of the Denver-based Chicano organization, La Cruzada por Justicia. At his trial, Tijerina defended himself with the help of two court-appointed lawyers. He was convicted of assault with intent to commit a violent felony (intent to kill or to commit mayhem) and of false imprisonment. He appealed his conviction to the New Mexico Court of Appeals, who certified the case to the New Mexico Supreme Court. His convictions were affirmed. Las Cruces was the venue for the San Joaquín trial. Forbidden from discussing the history of the land grant, Tijerina was ultimately convicted of destruction of federal property and assault on a federal officer and sentenced to two years' imprisonment.

=== Poor People's Campaign ===
Tijerina (left) with his brother Cristobal (right), during their arrest on April 26, 1968

In March 1968, Tijerina was elected to lead the Chicano contingent of the Southern Christian Leadership Conference's (SCLC) Poor People's March on Washington. Despite stunning setbacks, including the April 4 assassination of Martin Luther King Jr., the president of the SCLC, and the April 25 bombing of Tijerina's Albuquerque home, the SCLC was undeterred. Under the leadership of new SCLC president Ralph Abernathy, the march proceeded as planned, on May 2, 1968. Tijerina, with three busloads from New Mexico, met up with the Corky Gonzales-led Hispanic contingency from Colorado, the Alicia Escalante-led contingency from Los Angeles, the Reverend Nieto-led contingency from Texas, and a group of Puerto Ricans from New York. Together, they convened in "Resurrection City" with the African American factions led by Coretta Scott King and Abernathy. Tijerina insisted that the Native American delegations spearhead the march and be the first to demand justice, a proposal that had been approved during the original planning meeting with Dr. King. But when it came time to march, Abernathy's followers resisted the idea. Much was made of this "rift" in the mainstream press, which claimed that Tijerina insisted that the Hispanic delegation go first. En route to D.C., a group of Native Americans who were accompanied by Dick Gregory were detained by Washington State police. In protest, Tijerina organized a demonstration in front of the United States Supreme Court building on May 29. Police brutalized the demonstrators, but eventually, twenty delegates were permitted to meet with John Davis, the clerk of the court. The following month, leaders met with Secretary of State Dean Rusk. On June 23, 1969, the day that Warren E. Burger was sworn in as Chief Justice, Tijerina returned to Washington to place him under citizen's arrest. As he waited outside the Senate chamber, Burger never exited. He had dodged the arrest by exiting out a back door.

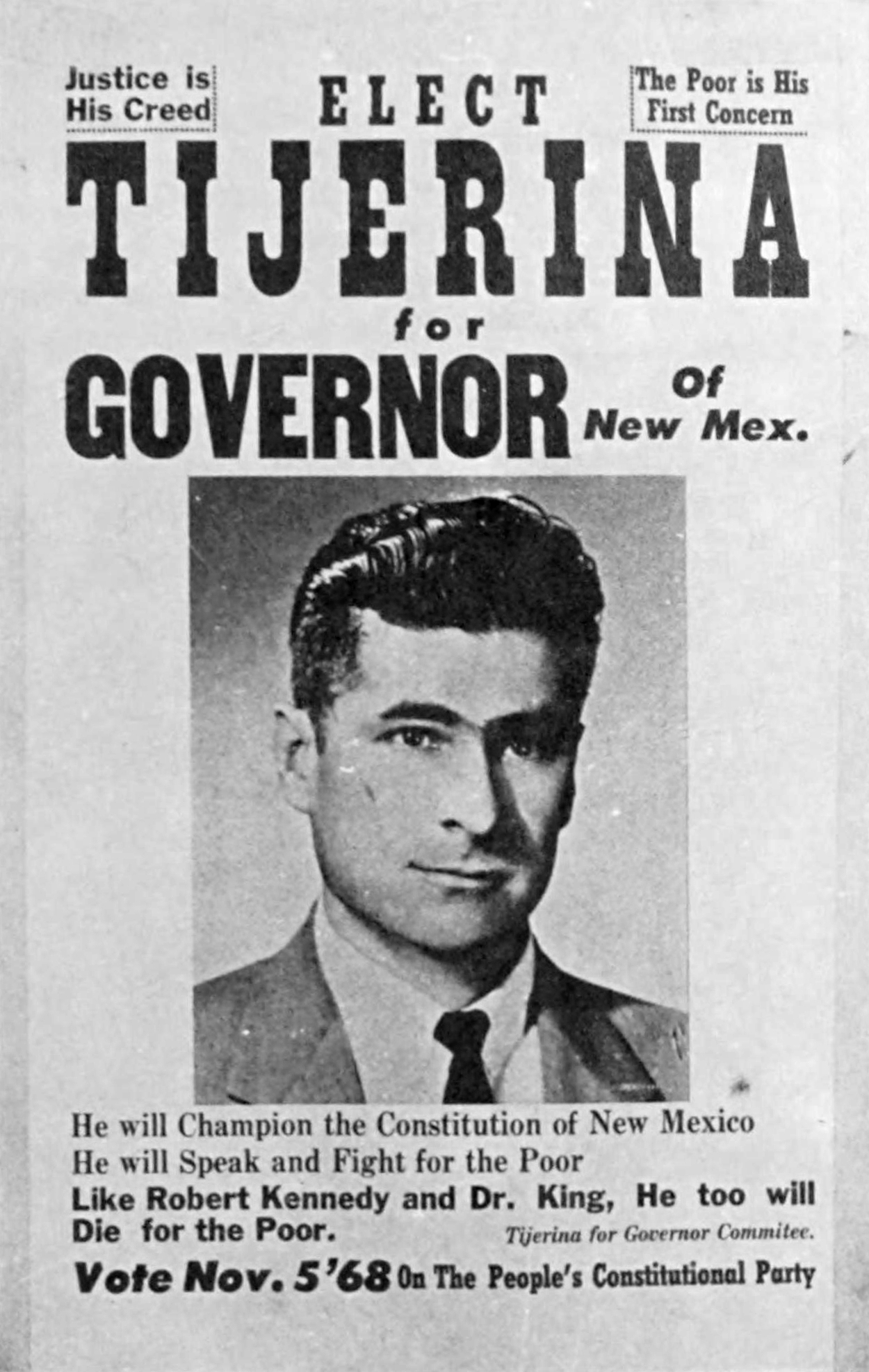
People's Constitutional Party campaign poster featuring Tijerina as a candidate for governor of New Mexico, 1968

Supporters of Tijerina formed the People's Constitutional Party in 1968. He was their candidate for governor of New Mexico that year, but was denied ballot access due to his status as a convicted felon.

=== Trial and incarceration ===
In early 1970, Tijerina was sentenced to prison for charges related to the 1967 Tierra Amarilla courthouse raid. The presiding judge, Garnett Burkes, denied defense claims of double jeopardy. A team of four lawyers spent eighteen months preparing the case, but on the opening day of the trial, Tijerina dismissed them, opting to defend himself. He was charged with the false imprisonment and assault of Daniel Rivera. Rivera, the prosecution's star witness, admitted under Tijerina's cross-examination that he neither knew federal civil rights laws, nor had he been trained in how to protect peoples' civil rights. He also testified that Tijerina was not to blame for the events at Tierra Amarilla. The Albuquerque Tribune compared Tijerina's courtroom performance with Clarence Darrow's. Dr. Frances Swadesh, a University of Colorado anthropologist, testified that Anglos had used force and legal maneuvers to steal the land. Tijerina based his closing argument on Article 6, Section two of the Constitution, which obligates the government to comply with the terms of international treaties, i.e., the protection of the property rights of land-grantees as provided by articles 8 and 9 of the Treaty of Guadalupe Hidalgo. He continued to assert his constitutional right to place a citizen's arrest on the law enforcement officers who, by their own admission, were ignorant of the law and had violated the Alianza's right of free assembly.

Tijerina was sentenced to two years in a federal prison. He was incarcerated in La Tuna, Texas, where he shared a cell with Joe Valachi. Suspecting a plot to poison him and blame the mafia, Tijerina refused to eat, preferring scraps saved by fellow Mexican prisoners.

At one point, he was transferred to Albuquerque, where he shared a cell with 25-year-old Walter Payton, a member of the white militia the Minutemen, who had been arrested by the FBI on weapons charges after five tons of weapons and ammunition were discovered near Truth or Consequences. When Payton learned that "King Tiger" was being held in the same facility, he told the authorities not to put them together, swearing he would kill Tijerina if he saw him. Prison officials promptly locked them in the same cell. But when the two talked peacefully for more than four hours, Payton was transferred out of the cell.

In 1970 Tijerina was transferred to a mental hospital in Springfield, Missouri. His exposure to the mentally ill combined with his historical research crystallized his concept of "Anglo psychopathy":

I believe the origins of the Anglo psychopathy began when the English were excluded from the Treaty of Tordesillas, signed June 7, 1494, between Spain and Portugal. The treaty was brokered by the Pope. It was at this time that the Anglo not only rejected the legitimate body of the era, but also the religion that went against them. The Anglo, without respect for authority and religion, and to get back into the colonization game, legalized piracy. They had to operate outside the law to become the law. Over the last 480 years, the Anglo complex of psychopathy has worsened. His conscience tortures him, and his thinking grows demented for having violated his own religion, his own law, and humanity.

It was also in the mental hospital that Tijerina began focusing on a "solution for peace among humanity" and found a new goal: "to promote fraternity and harmony among human beings."

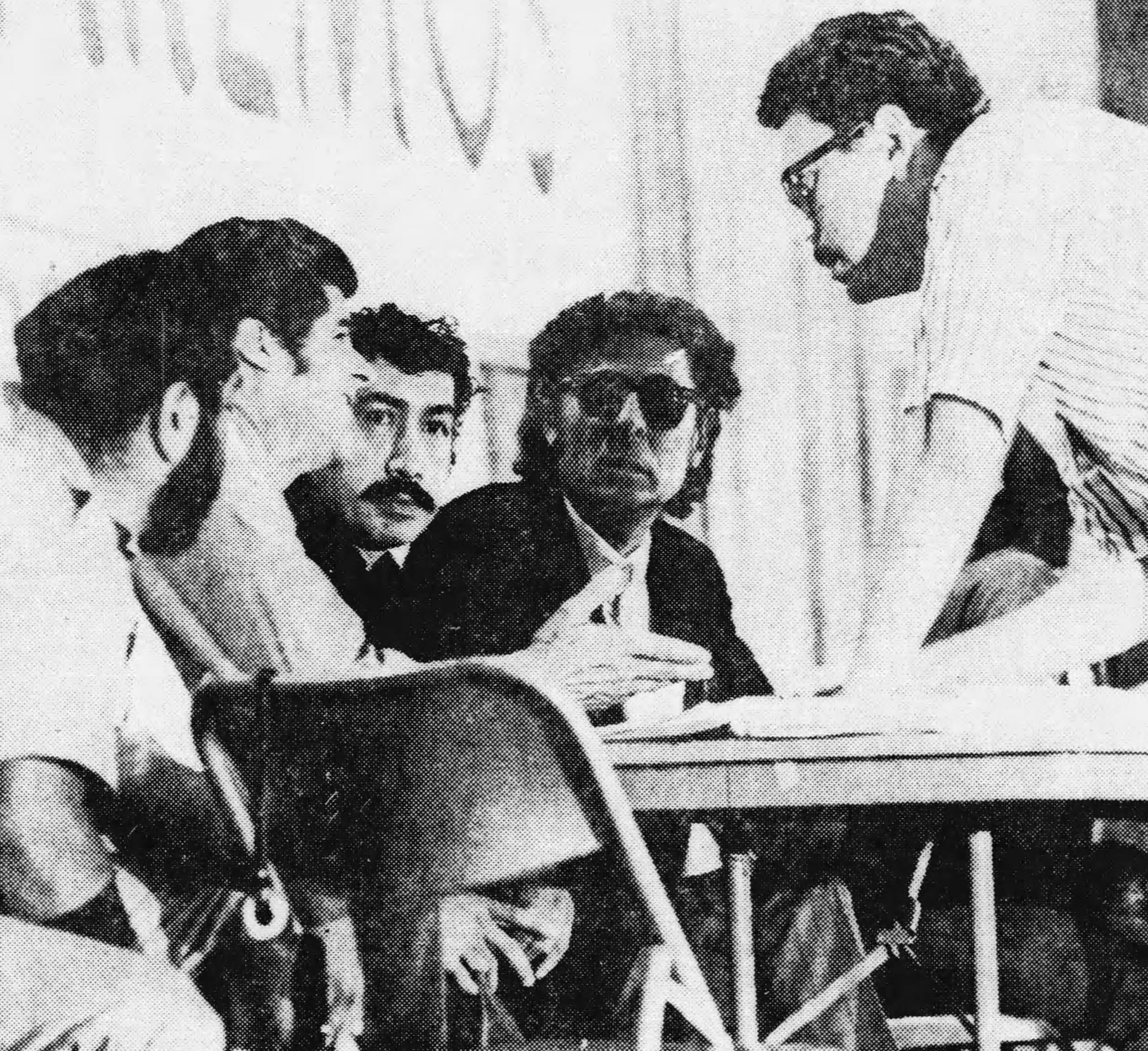
Three of the "Big Four" of the Chicano movement at the Raza Unida Party's 1972 convention: Reies Lopez Tijerina, New Mexico (second from left), Rodolfo "Corky" Gonzales, Colorado (center), and José Ángel Gutiérrez, Texas (far right). Cesar Chavez, California, did not attend.

One of the terms of his 1971 release was that he not hold any leadership in the Alianza. Nonetheless, Tijerina continued to advocate for land rights, for human unity, and for an investigation into the death of Eulogio Salazar. The League of United Latin American Citizens lent their support to the land grant cause in 1972 after the publication of a supportive report in the Tribune. But in spite of the new invigoration of the movement, little progress was made outside of the sphere of public awareness.

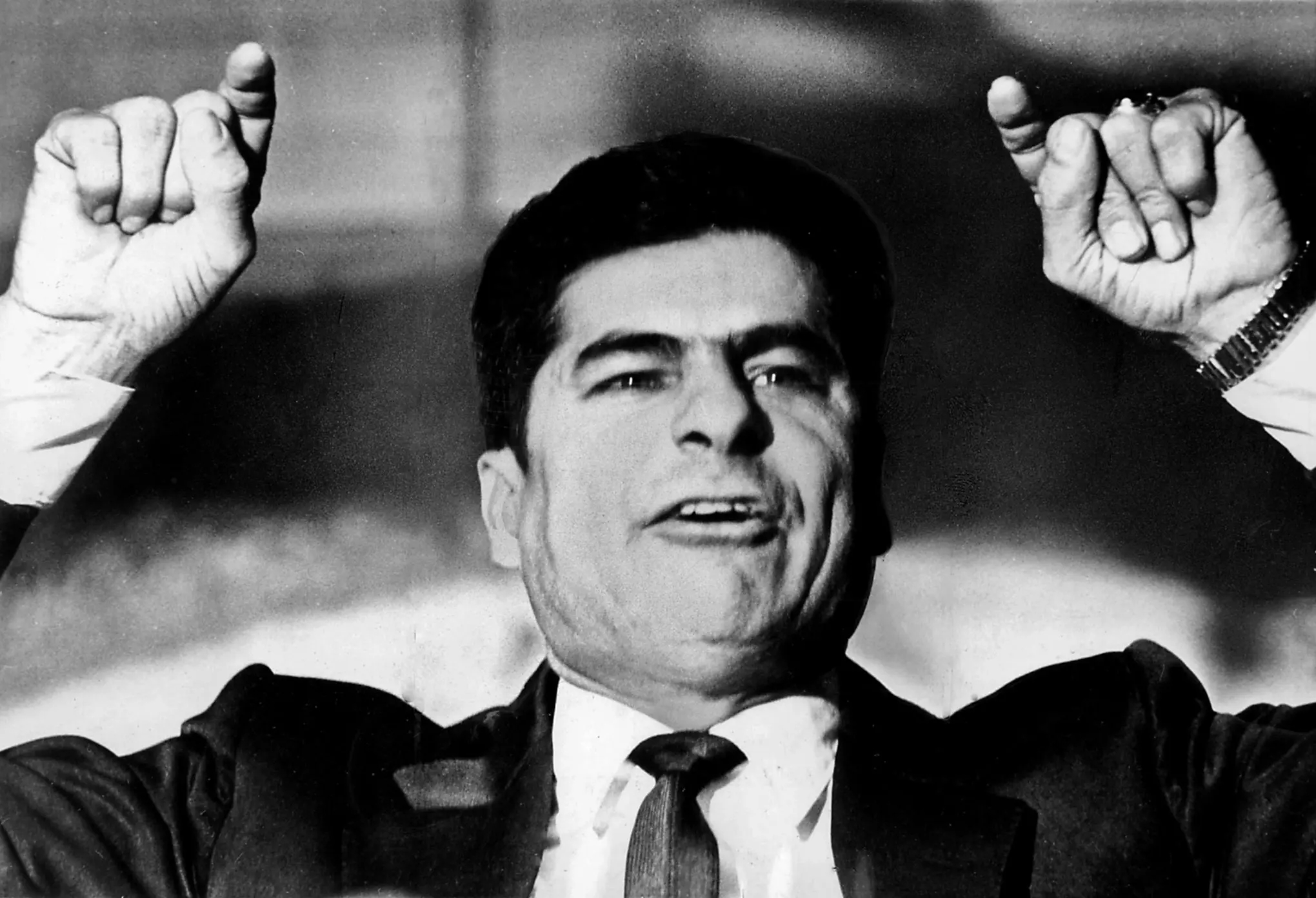
Tijerina in 1972

On June 29, 1974, Tijerina began his second prison term. During his incarceration he came into contact with Blas Chávez, a World War II veteran who had been involved in New Mexico politics and ended up out of favor with the powerful. He told Tijerina of the corrupt dealings of Senator Joseph Montoya and other politicians, as well as the details behind the murder of Eulogio Salazar.

== Later years ==
He lived in El Paso, Texas after about a year in Ciudad Juárez, Mexico where he moved in April 2006. After a fire claimed his New Mexico house in 1994, Tijerina moved to Uruapan, Michoacán, where he married for the third time. He presented his archival materials to the University of New Mexico on October 19, 1999. On November 5 of the same year, he met with senior staff of then-Governor of Texas George W. Bush's administration about land issues. A translation of his memoirs, previously only available in a 1978 Spanish version published by Mexico's Fondo de Cultura Económica, was published in 2000.

He died in El Paso, aged 88, on January 19, 2015.

== Notes ==
1. Tijerina, quoted in Nabokov, 195
2. Nabokov, 199
3. Tijerina, 1
4. Tijerina, 3
5. Tijerina, 5
6. Tijerina, 22
