= David Cargo =

American politician (1929–2013)

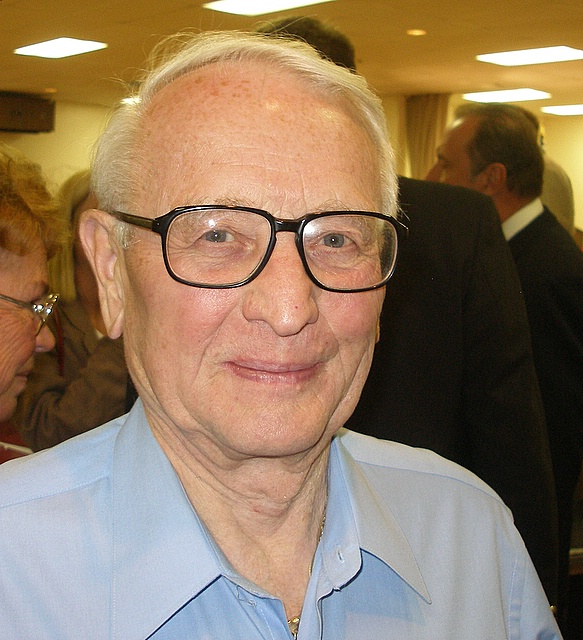

22nd Governor of New Mexico
- In office January 1, 1967 – January 1, 1971
- Lieutenant: Lee Francis
- Preceded by: Jack M. Campbell
- Succeeded by: Bruce King

Member of the New Mexico House of Representatives
- In office January 1, 1963 – January 1, 1967

Personal details
- Born: David Francis Cargo; January 13, 1929 Dowagiac, Michigan, U.S.
- Died: July 5, 2013 (aged 84) Albuquerque, New Mexico, U.S.
- Resting place: Santa Fe National Cemetery; Santa Fe, New Mexico
- Party: Republican
- Spouse: Ida Jo Anaya Cargo (divorced)
- Children: 5
- Education: University of Michigan (BA, MA, LLB)

Military service
- Allegiance: United States
- Branch/service: United States Army
- Years of service: 1953-1955

David Francis Cargo (January 13, 1929 – July 5, 2013) was an American attorney and politician who served as the 22nd governor of New Mexico between 1967 and 1971.

He was a member of the Republican Party.

== Early life and education ==
Cargo was born in Dowagiac, Michigan, the eldest of three children of Francis and Mary Harton Cargo. He received a Bachelor of Arts (1951), Master of Arts (1953), and in 1957, a L.L.B., all from the University of Michigan.

== Career ==
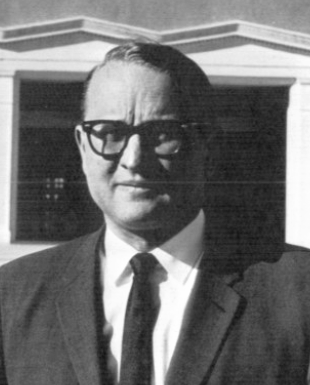
Cargo as governor.

He represented the Albuquerque area in the New Mexico House of Representatives from 1963 to 1967, when he was elected governor at the age of thirty-seven. As a representative he won one of the first lawsuits forcing proportional representation in the state legislature. He remains one of the youngest governors elected to date in U.S. history, along with Harold Stassen in Minnesota (1938), Bill Clinton in Arkansas (1978), Christopher "Kit" Bond and Matt Blunt in Missouri (1972) and (2004), respectively, and Bobby Jindal in Louisiana (2007).

Cargo ran for Governor in 1966, facing Clifford J. Hawley of Santa Fe in the Republican primary. In 1966, Cargo won with 17,836 (51.8 percent) to Hawley's 16,588 (48.2 percent). He improved his primary performance in 1968, when he defeated Hawley, 28,014 (54.9 percent) to 23,052 (45.1 percent).

Cargo won the general election of 1966, narrowly defeating Democrat Gene Lusk. Cargo received 134,625 votes (51.7 percent) to Lusk's 125,587 (48.3 percent). Running again in 1968, Cargo won by an even smaller margin, 160,140 (50.5 percent) to Democrat Fabian Chavez Jr.,'s 157,230 ballots (49.5 percent).

As governor, Cargo established the state film commission, which brought millions of dollars in revenue to the state of New Mexico. Cargo established ties to Hollywood and was even asked to appear in several films. In 1971, he made a cameo appearance in Bunny O'Hare, starring Bette Davis and Ernest Borgnine, as well as in Up in the Cellar (1970), starring Larry Hagman and Joan Collins. During his first campaign for governor, he was known as "Lonesome Dave."

On May 8, 1970, Cargo sent National Guard troops to the UNM campus when Jane Fonda spoke to an estimated 700 protesters. Gathered to protest the Vietnam War and the Kent State massacre that had happened just four days earlier, the National Guard was given orders to end the protest and bayonetted 11 people, including students who were not part of the protest. A class action lawsuit was brought against Cargo and individual guardsmen by six of the bayonetting victims. A jury in Albuquerque eventually sided with Cargo, the National Guard, and the other politicians involved leaving victims to pay their own medical bills.

Cargo could not seek a third two-year term in 1970 due to term limits. Cargo ran for the U.S. Senate in 1970, but he lost the Republican primary to Anderson "Andy" Carter. Carter polled 32,122 (57.8 percent) to Cargo's 17,951 (32.3 percent). Andy Carter then lost the general election to incumbent Democrat Joseph Montoya. Cargo ran unsuccessfully for New Mexico's other Senate seat in 1972 but again lost the primary, this time to the eventual winner, Pete Domenici.

From 1973 to 1985, Cargo lived in Lake Oswego, Oregon, and ran unsuccessfully for Oregon State Treasurer in 1984, placing third in the Republican primary won by appointed incumbent Bill Rutherford.

After returning to New Mexico, Cargo won the Republican nomination for Congress in 1986 for New Mexico's 3rd congressional district but was defeated by the incumbent, Democrat Bill Richardson. Cargo ran for mayor of Albuquerque in 1989 but placed third, and thus did not advance to the top-two runoff. In 1993 he ran again but lost to Martin Chávez. He tried for a gubernatorial comeback in 1994 but finished in fourth place with 13 percent in the primary and lost to the eventual winner, Gary Johnson. Cargo made his final race in 1997 when he again contested the Albuquerque mayoralty, but he finished third and lost to Jim Baca.

Cargo continued to practice law in Albuquerque. In 2010, he wrote an autobiography titled Lonesome Dave.

The Library for the Luna Community College site in Mora, NM is named after David Cargo.

== Personal life ==
Cargo and his wife, Ida Jo, had five children: Veronica, David, Patrick, Elena and Eamon.

Cargo died at the age of eighty-four of complications of a stroke which he had two years earlier.

Party political offices
Preceded by Merle Tucker	Republican nominee for Governor of New Mexico; 1966, 1968	Succeeded by Pete Domenici
Preceded by Harry E. Kinney (1981)	Republican nominee for Mayor of Albuquerque; 1993	Succeeded by Vickie Perea
Political offices
Preceded by Jack Campbell	Governor of New Mexico; January 1, 1967 – January 1, 1971	Succeeded by Bruce King
