= Canjilón Mountain =

Mountain in New Mexico, United States

- Location within New Mexico

Highest point
- Elevation: 10,922 ft (3,329 m) NAVD 88
- Prominence: 1,034 ft (315 m)
- Coordinates: 36°34′05″N 106°21′06″W

Geography
- Location: Rio Arriba County, New Mexico, U.S.
- Parent range: Tusas Mountains
- Topo map: USGS Canjilon Mountain

Canjilón Mountain is a 10,922 feet (3,329 m). mountain approximately six miles northeast of the village of Canjilón, in the Carson National Forest.

The word cajilon is the term for "deer antler" in Northern New Mexican Spanish. The mountain was so named because of its resemblance to an antler. The mountain gave its name to the nearby creek (Canjilon Creek), to the nearby lakes (Canjilon lakes), and to the village of Canjilon.

Canjilón Mountain was the site of a 3.7 magnitude earthquake on June 4, 2008.
