= Alianza Federal de Mercedes =

Federal Land Grant Alliance of the 1960s that fought for Chicano New Mexicans

Alianza Federal de Mercedes, which in English translates to Federal Land Grant Alliance, was a group led by Reies Tijerina based in New Mexico in the 1960s that fought for the land rights of Hispano New Mexicans.

The Alianza had affiliates in Tierra Amarilla, New Mexico and San Luis, Colorado.

Hispano residents had settled in the areas of northern New Mexico and southern Colorado centuries before. Under the Treaty of Guadalupe Hidalgo, the United States Congress ostensibly guaranteed that current residents would retain their land rights after the New Mexico Territory was transferred to U.S. ownership. However, by the 1960s, many traditional shepherds had lost their land to cattle ranchers and the U.S. Forest Service.

Justice is Our Creed and the Land is Our Heritage.

— Alianza Federal de Mercedes' slogan,

== The Tierra Amarilla incident ==
On June 5, 1967, in Tierra Amarilla, a small band of Chicanos affiliated with Alianza Federal de Mercedes attempted to arrest the county's district attorney and put him on trial. There were shots fired and two men were wounded. The invaders held the courthouse for two hours, ransacking it, but the district attorney was out of town. The National Guard, equipped with armored tanks, was called in by Governor of New Mexico David Cargo. While the gunmen were in hiding, the National Guard held many of their family members captive. This incident received national publicity and brought the Alianza's cause to public attention.

Prior to the incident, quoted from The Chicanos: Mexican American Voices, edited by Ed Ludwig and James Santibanez. "In June, 1967, Tijerina attempted to hold a mass meeting of the Alianza. The District Attorney of Rio Arriba County, Alfonso Sanchez, issued a statement on a radio broadcast:

... I wish to give all notice to all Alianza members who plan to be present and participate in the meeting at Coyote tomorrow. That meeting is versus the law since it is planned to take over private property. Criminal charges of unlawful assembly will be filed against all persons who attend.

The District Attorney did not stop with the warning. The night before the meeting, cars of the State Police traced swift paths through the night, through the small, darkened towns of Rio Arriba County and to the homes of those members of the Alianza who, they thought, might attend the meeting arranged by Reies Tijernia. There was sudden pounding on wooden doors, house lights flicked on, startled faces appeared in the night. "You're under arrest," were the often repeated words. Nine Alianza members were jailed. Two days later the Alianza had procured a warrant for the arrest of District Attorney Alfonso Sanchez. Armed, their group entered the courthouse at Tierra Amarilla in an attempt to make a citizen's arrest.

== See also ==
- People's Constitutional Party
- Tierra Amarilla Land Grant
