= Lake Alamosa =

Former lake in Colorado, United States

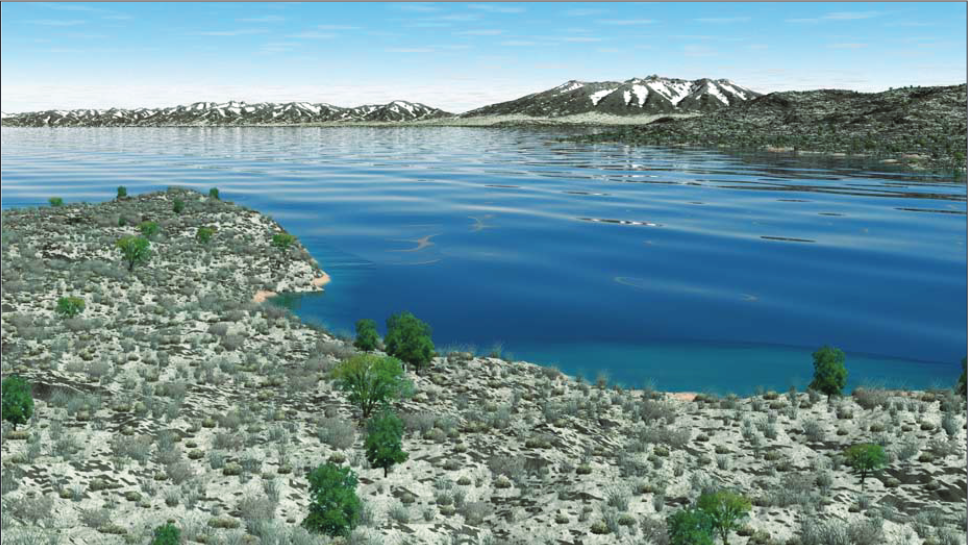
- Simulation of Lake Alamosa's surface, looking towards Blanca Peak

- Location within Colorado
- Location: San Luis Valley, Colorado
- Coordinates: 37°12′N 105°25′W
- Type: former lake
- Basin countries: United States of America

Lake Alamosa is a former lake in Colorado. It existed from the Pliocene to the middle Pleistocene in the San Luis Valley, fed by glacial meltwater from surrounding mountain ranges. Water levels waxed and waned with the glacial stages until at highstand the lake (high water level in the lake) reached an elevation of 2,335 meters (7,661 ft) and probably a surface of over 4,000 square kilometers (1,500 sq mi), but only sparse remains of the former waterbody are visible today. The existence of the lake was postulated in the early 19th century and eventually proven in the early 20th century.

The lake eventually overflowed into the Rio Grande river system during the middle Pleistocene. The overflow cut down a valley that eventually drained the lake, leaving only the San Luis Closed Basin as a remnant. The Alamosa Formation is a rock formation left by the lake. Groundwater resources are contained trapped between sediments left by the former lake.

== Description ==
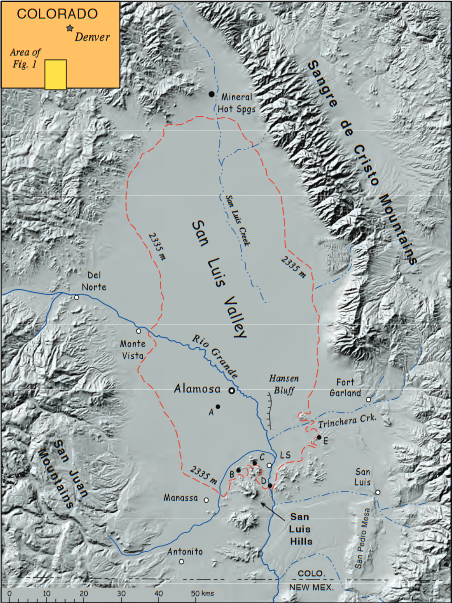
Map of the San Luis Basin, with margins of the lake outlined with red lines

The lake was in southern Colorado, at high altitude, covering most of the San Luis Valley/San Luis Basin north of the San Luis Hills. It reached an elevation of 2,335 meters (7,661 ft) at highstand. Westwards, Lake Alamosa spread to the San Juan Mountains close to Monte Vista to the west. Northwards, it almost reached the present-day location of Saguache. It was about 105 kilometers (65 mi) long in north–south direction and reached a maximum width of 48 kilometers (30 mi), making it one of North America's largest high elevation lakes, comparable only to the historic Lake Texcoco in Mexico. The surface area may have exceeded 4,000 square kilometers (1,500 sq mi) at highstand. It is likely that some water seeped out of the lake before its final overflow as groundwater.

Saddleback Mountain was an island in Lake Alamosa, and its northern side was swept by waves during storms owing to the lake's long fetch. Additional islands were located in its southern basin; today they are hills. The city of Alamosa and possibly also the town of Center, Colorado are located within the former lake's floor. San Luis Lake presently occupies a small basin in the former lake floor; the basin was previously occupied by a leftover of Lake Alamosa, Lake Sipapu.

Because of the old age of Lake Alamosa, shorelines and shoreline features are often buried or eroded; in many places former shorelines are only highlighted by changes in vegetation patterns or slope angle. Barrier bars, lagoons and spits formed in Lake Alamosa when it reached its highest stand. In particular, two spits at Saddleback Mountain are testimony to the existence of the former lake, and additional large spits formed close to Sierra del Ojito and at the Brownie Hills. Barrier bars dammed creeks which in turn formed lagoons; such lagoon-bar systems are found for example around Trinchera Creek. Wind-eroded rock structures occur along its former southeastern shore.

== Climate ==
During the glacial times of Lake Alamosa's existence, the basin was colder than today and possibly also drier. The lake was nourished by glacial meltwater coming from the San Juan, Sawatch, and Sangre de Cristo Mountains. Presently, the climate at Alamosa is cold and dry, with mean annual temperatures of 5 °C (41 °F) and mean annual precipitation of 180 millimeters per year (7.1 in/year).

== Geologic history ==
The San Luis Basin is the largest basin of the Rio Grande Rift and is bordered to the east by a fault. It constitutes an east-tilted half-graben that is subdivided by additional fault systems. Its southern reaches are covered by the volcanic Servilleta Formation. The valley forms the headwaters of the Rio Grande.

Lake Alamosa existed for about 3 million years, from the Pliocene to the middle Pleistocene. Rocks in the San Luis horst stretch across the entire Alamosa Basin and together with 4.8-3.7 million years old basaltic lava flows of the Taos Plateau blocked the basin from draining to the south. Tectonic uplift of the Jemez lineament, tectonic subsidence of the Lake Alamosa area and the emplacement of these lava flows may have obstructed former drainages, but evidence of prior southwards drainage has been found only recently. South of Lake Alamosa an even older lake, Lake Sunshine, occupied the Sunshine Valley during the Pliocene.

Many lakes in western North America are cyclical, becoming deep and large during stadials and shallow and small during interstadials. Lake Alamosa briefly reached elevations of 2,292–2,304 meters (7,520–7,559 ft) at Hansen Bluff four times during its history. According to modelling, ongoing sedimentation in the lake basin would have led to gradually increasing water levels during each stadial over time. Aside from climatic influences, the Bishop Tuff eruption of the Long Valley caldera in California and the Huckleberry Ridge eruption of the Yellowstone Caldera deposited tephra in Lake Alamosa. Sedimentation occurred in the basin floor, although slip along the Sangre de Cristo fault to the east created accumulation space.

=== Overflow ===
It overflowed about 440,000 years ago, when it reached a highstand during oxygen isotope stage 12, one of the major glaciations of the Northern Hemisphere. This date is not firmly established, however, and the overflow might have occurred between 690,000 and 440,000 years ago or after 376,000 years ago. The glaciation was ending at that time, and meltwater from declining glaciers may have helped raise the water levels until the lake overflowed. Continuing uplift in the Southern Rocky Mountains may also have played a role.

Lake Alamosa overflowed through the Costilla Plain into New Mexico, in a gap between the Fairy Hills and the Brownie Hills. From there water would have flowed across the Costilla Plain and the Taos Plateau to join the Rio Grande and Red River west of Questa, New Mexico. Faulting had weakened rocks at the overflow threshold, thus facilitating erosion of the threshold. More than one channel may have been active as overflow path before the flow became focused on the present-day path of the Rio Grande. The water would have reached the Culebra Creek and eventually the Red River at La Junta Point; the Red River constituted the headwater of the Rio Grande during that time. The overflow of Lake Alamosa into the Rio Grande expanded its catchment by about 22,000 square kilometers (8,500 sq mi)-18,000 square kilometers (6,900 sq mi), adding the high, glaciated San Juan Mountains, the upper Sangre de Cristo Mountains and Sawatch Range to its watershed.

Water levels dropped quickly after the overflow began, preventing the formation of the repeated shorelines that are common at shrinking pluvial lakes where the decline in water levels is paced by evaporation. The decline probably was not as quick as during the Bonneville flood of Lake Bonneville, another example of a lake overflow event in North America, as the rocks at Lake Alamosa were more solid and there is no clear indication of a catastrophic overflow flood. Later research has indicated that the downcutting of the outlet may have continued for several hundred thousand years after the initial breach, and was accompanied by an integration of the Rio Grande all the way to the Gulf of Mexico. That the lake drained after groundwater sapping has also been postulated but is less likely.

=== After the overflow ===
After the drainage of the lake the lakefloor was eroded by streams, which redeposited its sediments, and soils formed. The lake would have been replaced by dry lakes and anastomosing stream networks. Creeks cut into the lake floor, forming valleys that later filled with alluvium.

The Alamosa Formation, a geological formation, fills the basin of Lake Alamosa; it represents the deep water deposits of Lake Alamosa. Impermeable deposits of the lake such as the "blue clay" generate groundwater accumulations that are exploited for irrigation purposes. The Verdos Alluvium of the Denver Basin may correlate to certain deposits on the shores of Lake Alamosa.

While it was formerly thought that the Great Sand Dunes were formed from sediments on the floor of Lake Alamosa but later research indicated that these sediments probably played an only minor role. The development of the dunes however certainly post-dated the disappearance of Lake Alamosa as the lake would have impeded the transport of sand across the San Luis Valley.

== Research history ==
Decades before the region was settled and earlier than other geologic expeditions such as those of John Wesley Powell, in 1811-1812 Jacob Fowler recorded the following:

I Have no doubt but the River from the Head of those Rocks up for about one Hundred miles Has once been a lake of about from forty to fifty miles Wide and about two Hundred feet deep—and that the running and dashing of the Watter Has Woren a Way the Rocks So as to form the present Chanel.

— Jacob Fowler

The lake is named after the Alamosa Formation, which in turn received its name from Siebenthal 1910 who in that year postulated the existence of a former lake in the Alamosa Basin. In the same year proof of the existence of the lake was found in well logs.

Later, the geologist Ferdinand Vandeveer Hayden in 1875 wrote a more detailed account of the former lake, although he got some details wrong, and proposed the name "Coronado's lakes" for Lake Alamosa and another lake he believed to have existed in the Costilla Plain. It took almost a century after 1910 until a more detailed analysis of the deposits of the former lake - including identifying its former maximum elevation - was possible, however. Most information on the history of Lake Alamosa's water levels has been obtained at the "Bachus pit" gravel pit in Alamosa County, as elsewhere lake deposits have been altered. Both beach and deep-water deposits (from the highstand before overflow) are encountered there.
