= Rio Grande del Norte National Monument =

Protected area in New Mexico, United States

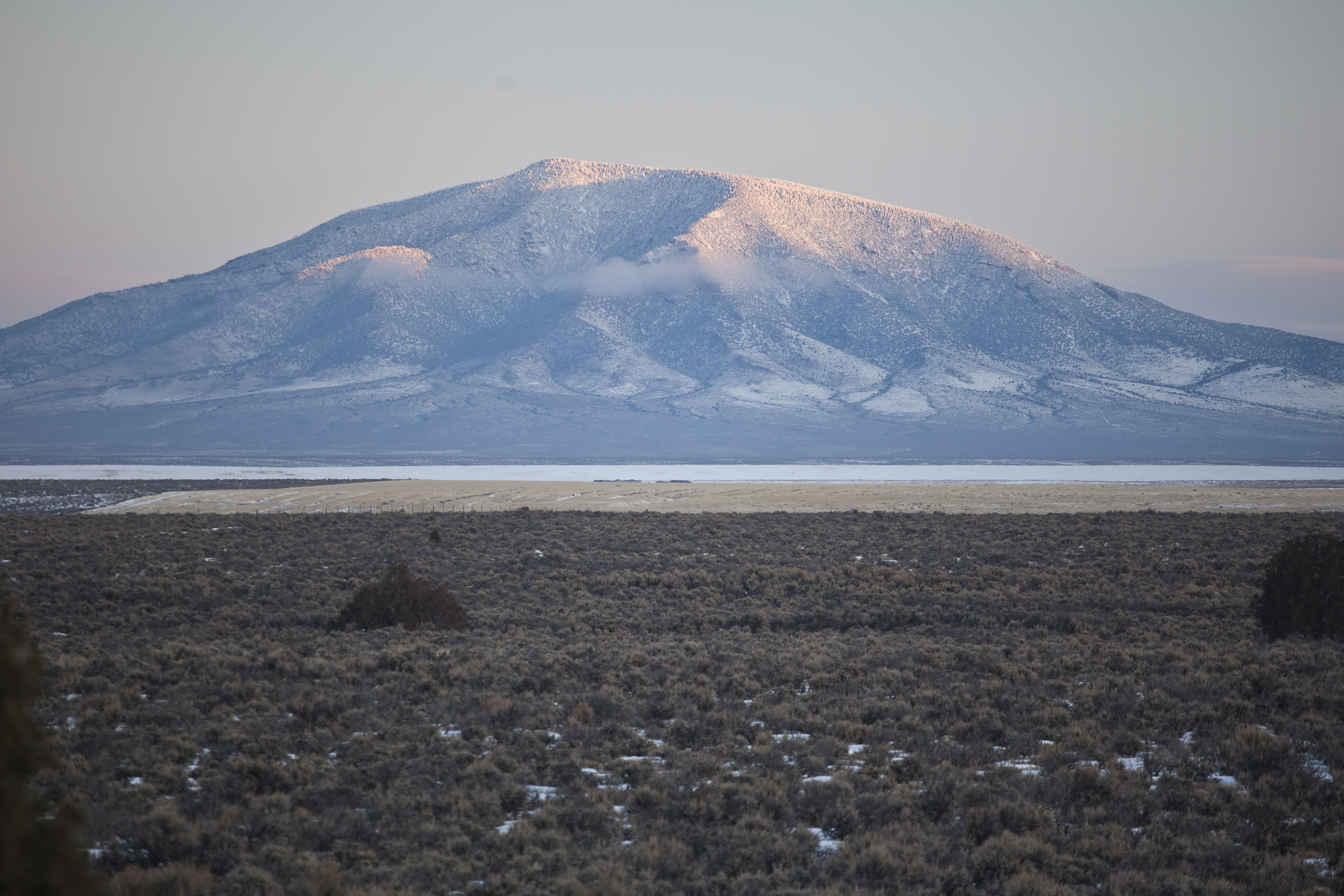
- Río Grande del Norte, New Mexico.

- Location within New Mexico Location within the United States
- Interactive map of Rio Grande del Norte National Monument
- Location: Taos County, New Mexico, United States
- Nearest city: Questa, New Mexico
- Coordinates: 36°40′0″N 105°42′0″W
- Area: 242,555 acres (98,159 ha)
- Established: March 25, 2013
- Governing body: U.S. Bureau of Land Management
- Website: Rio Grande del Norte National Monument

U.S. National Monument

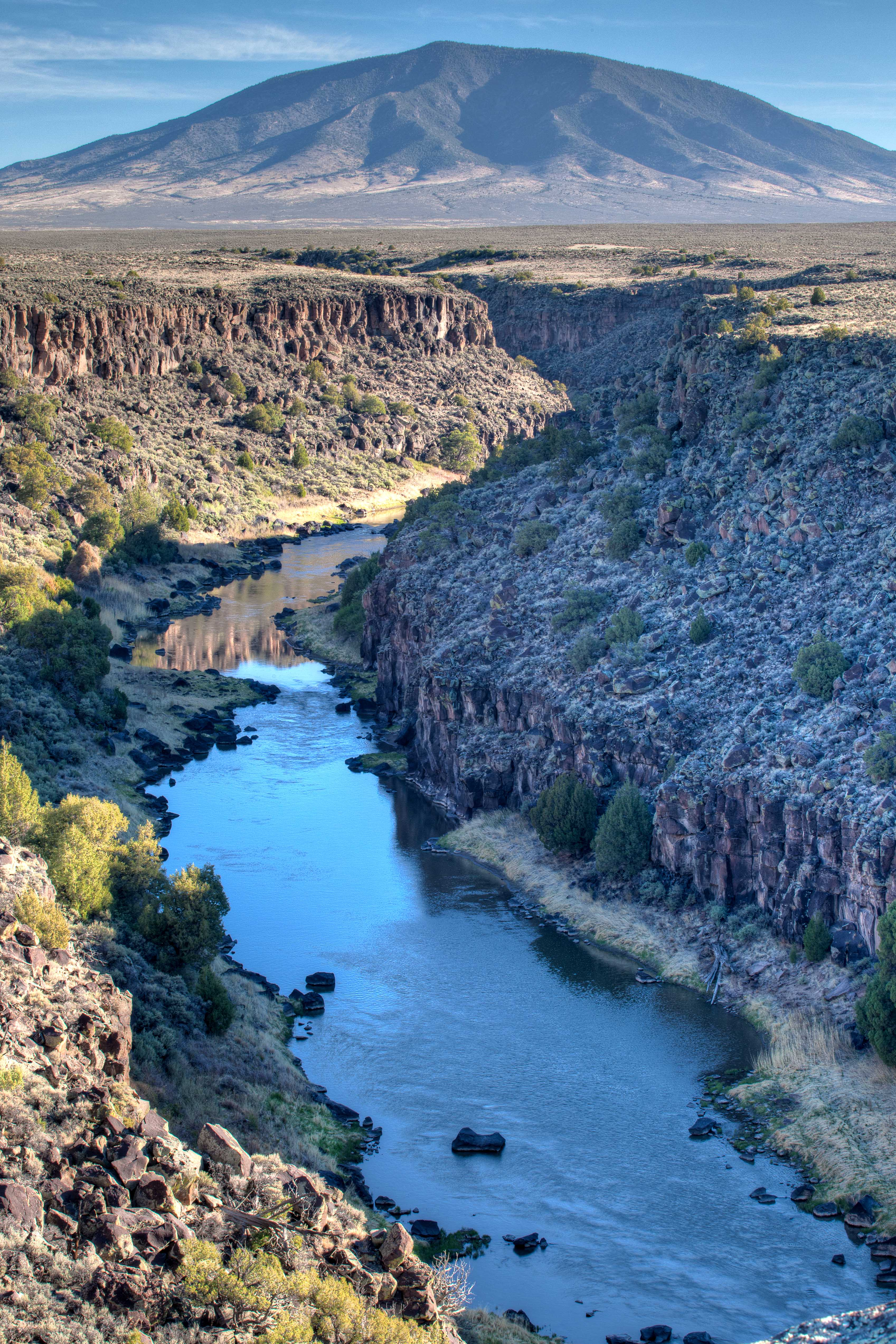
Ute Mountain (10, 093 ft) and the upper Rio Grande gorge

The Rio Grande del Norte National Monument is an approximately 242,555-acre (98,159 ha) area of public lands in Taos County, New Mexico, United States, proclaimed as a national monument on March 25, 2013, by President Barack Obama under the provisions of the Antiquities Act. It consists of the Rio Grande Gorge and surrounding lands, managed by the Bureau of Land Management (BLM).

The monument includes two BLM recreation areas, a portion of the Rio Grande designated as a Wild and Scenic River, and the Red River Wild and Scenic River. On March 12, 2019, the John D. Dingell Jr. Conservation, Management, and Recreation Act designated two federal wilderness areas within the monument: the Rio San Antonio Wilderness in the northwest corner, and the Cerro del Yuta Wilderness in the northeast corner.

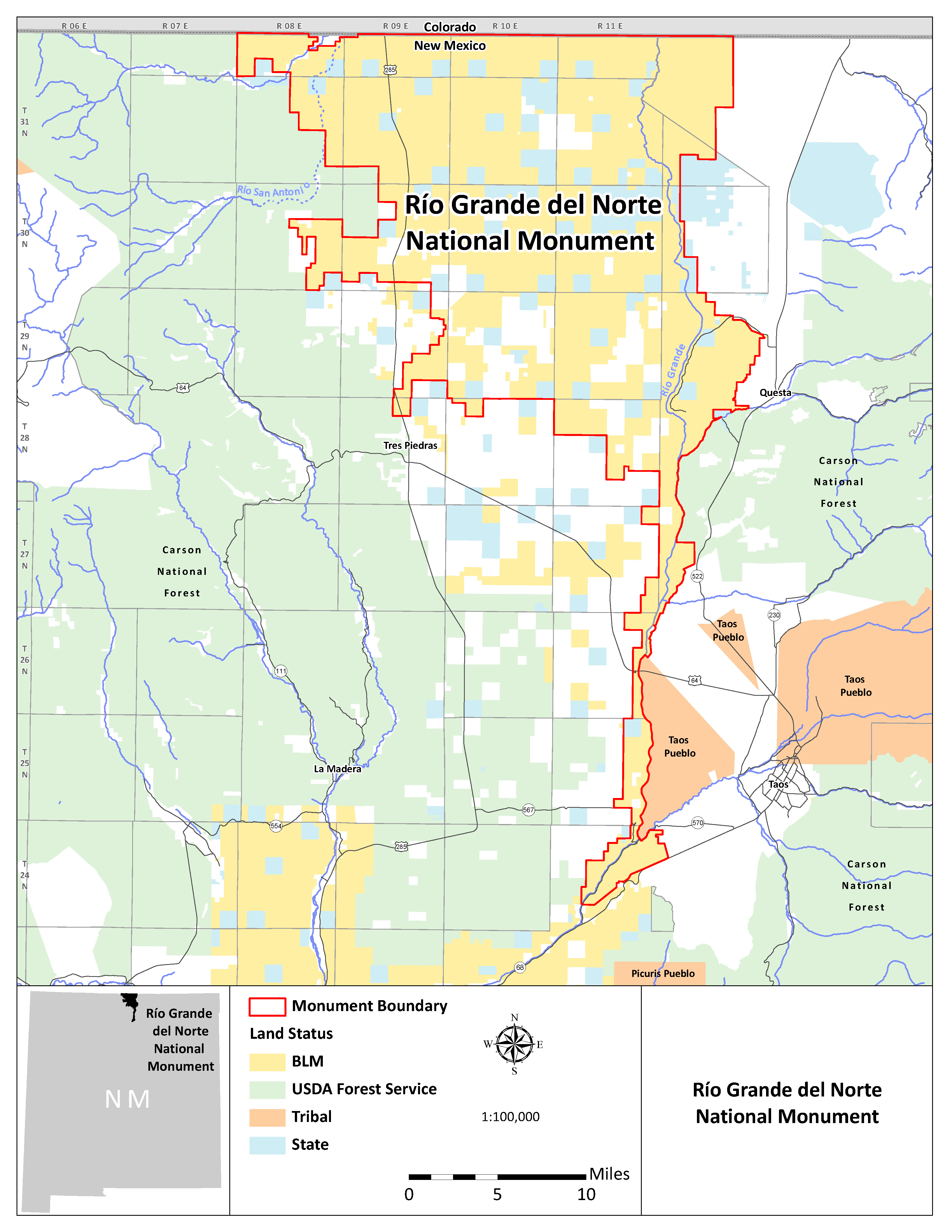
Map of Rio Grande del Norte National Monument. Also see resolution adjustable pdf map.

== Environment ==
The monument includes portions of the Taos Plateau volcanic field, cut by the gorges of the Rio Grande and the Rio San Antonio. Significant volcanic peaks include Cerro de la Olla, Cerro Chiflo, and Ute Mountain which, at 10,093 feet (3,076 m) ft, is the tallest peak entirely within the national monument. San Antonio Mountain, which at 10,908 feet (3,325 m) is the tallest peak in the volcanic field, is only partially within the bounds of the monument. The volcanoes and the rhyolite-basalt plateau, as well as the course of the Rio Grande, are the result of spreading along the Rio Grande rift, that transects north–south from Colorado to Mexico. Large springs, some of them hot, are believed to be the outflow from flooded lava tube systems. Ecosystems vary from willow and cottonwood stands along the rivers to sagebrush plains on the plateau, transitioning to pinyon pine in the hills and ponderosa pine and Douglas-fir in the mountains. The monument provides habitat for a variety of resident and migrant birds. Large mammals include elk, mule deer, pronghorn and bighorn sheep, as well as predators such as cougar, bobcat, river otters, black bears and coyotes. The plateau provides winter range for many of the larger grazing animals.

== History ==
The valley of the Rio Grande has been inhabited at least to the Archaic period, as evidenced by petroglyphs on exposed rock surfaces, and by the remains of stone tools quarried in the mountains. San Antonio Mountain was a significant source of dacite for tools. Other artifacts include potsherds, projectile points and the remains of pit houses. In historic times the Jicarilla Apache and Utes, as well as the peoples of Taos Pueblo and Picuris Pueblo have inhabited the area. Settlement in the area was not successful, leaving the abandoned remains of early 20th century homesteads, mainly in the area of Cerro Montoso.

== Activities ==
Rafting and boating through the Rio Grande Gorge is a popular activity. Rapids vary between Class II and Class V. Rafting and boating trips are available from commercial outfitters. Mountain biking is permitted on designated trails and roads. Off-highway vehicles are permitted on designated roads. A number of paved highways cross the monument, including the Wild Rivers Backcountry Byway, New Mexico Highway 570, and U.S. Routes 64 and 285. Route 64 crosses the Rio Grande Gorge on the 660-foot (200 m) high Rio Grande Gorge Bridge. Fishing for brown and rainbow trout and northern pike is available on the Red River and the Rio Grande, subject to New Mexico regulations. Hunting is also permitted in the monument, subject to game regulations. There are five campgrounds located within the monument, one in the river gorge.

== Administration ==
The national monument is administered by the Bureau of Land Management as a unit of the National Landscape Conservation System. Monument lands are withdrawn from mineral exploration apart from pre-existing claims. Existing utility line rights-of-way will be regulated by the BLM, as will traditional native access and grazing rights. The use of motorized vehicles is permitted only on designated roads.

Two BLM visitor centers serve the monument. The Wild Rivers Visitor Center is located in the Wild Rivers Recreation Area near Questa. The Rio Grande Gorge Visitor Center is near the Orilla Verde Recreation Area near Pilar. The monument is administered from the BLM's Taos field office.

== See also ==
- List of national monuments of the United States
