= Cerro del Yuta Wilderness =

Protected area in New Mexico, US

- IUCN category Ib (wilderness area)
- Location within the United States
- Location: Taos County, New Mexico, USA
- Nearest city: Questa, NM
- Coordinates: 36.9375366°N 105.6926552°W
- Area: 13,420 acres (54 km^{2})
- Established: 2019
- Governing body: U.S. Department of Interior Bureau of Land Management

Cerro del Yuta Wilderness is a 13,420-acre (5,625 ha) wilderness area in the Rio Grande del Norte National Monument managed by the U.S. Bureau of Land Management in the U.S. state of New Mexico. Established in 2019, this Wilderness is centered around Ute Mountain (not to be confused with Ute Mountain, a different peak in Colorado), the high point of the monument at 10,093 feet (3076 m). The mountain is a volcanic cone set atop the Taos Plateau. The area's forest is made up of pinyon pine and juniper on the lower slopes, with ponderosa pine and douglas fir on the upper north facing slopes, and even some aspen groves close to the summit.

== See also ==
- List of U.S. Wilderness Areas
