= San Antonio Mountain (New Mexico) =

Volcanic mountain in New Mexico, US

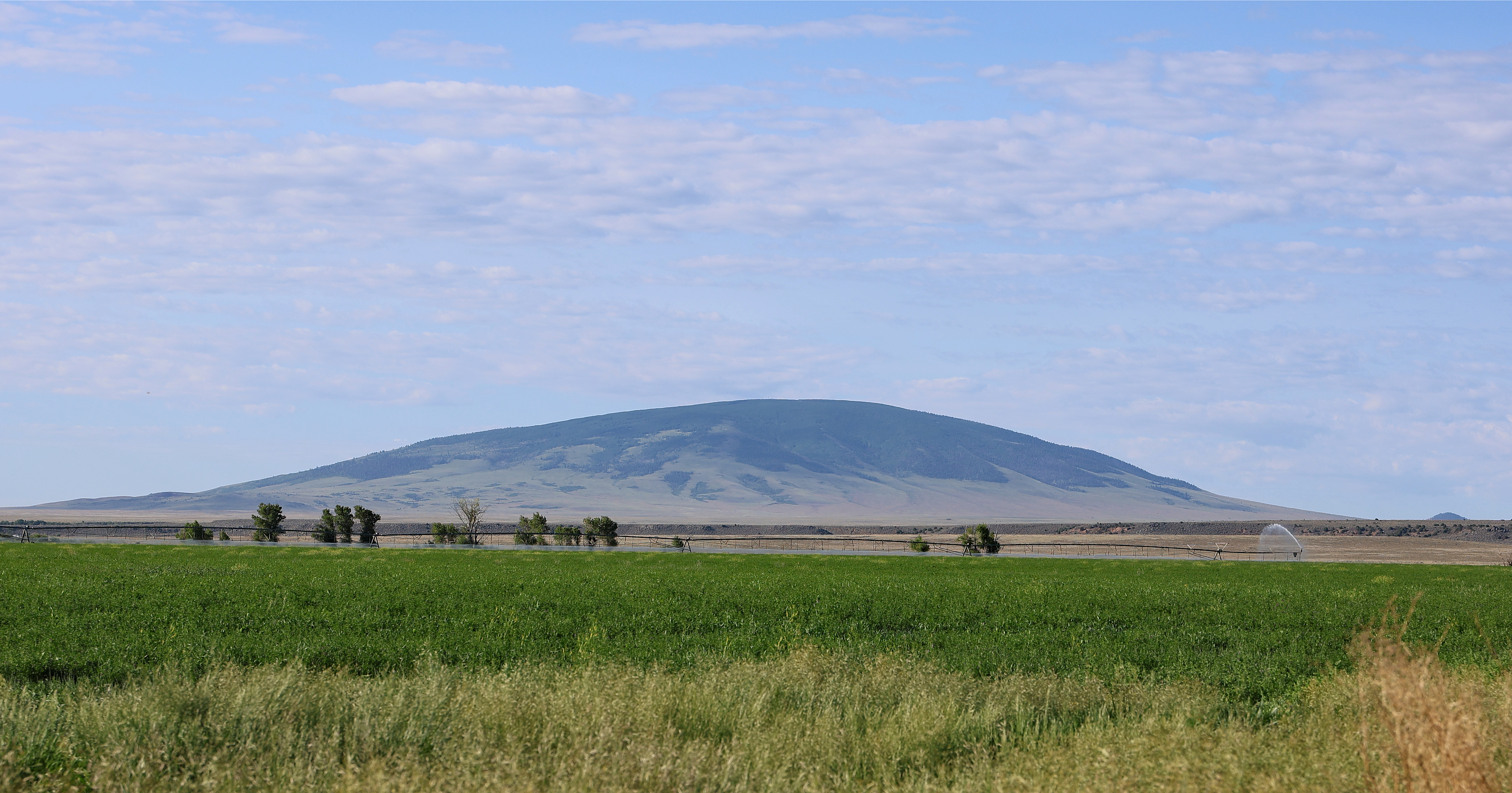
- The mountain's north aspect, viewed from a point along Colorado State Highway 17 west of Antonito

Highest point
- Elevation: 10,912 ft (3,326 m) NAVD 88
- Prominence: 2,108 ft (643 m)
- Coordinates: 36°51′34″N 106°01′07″W

Geography
- Location within New Mexico
- Location: Rio Arriba County, New Mexico, U.S.
- Topo map: USGS San Antonio Mountain N. Mex.

Geology
- Mountain type: Shield volcano
- Volcanic field: Taos Plateau volcanic field

San Antonio Mountain is a free-standing volcanic peak in Rio Arriba County, New Mexico. With an elevation of 10,908 feet, San Antonio Mountain is the highest peak within the Taos Plateau volcanic field, the largest volcanic field within the Rio Grande Rift valley.

The mountain lies just outside a northwest boundary of the Rio Grande del Norte National Monument. It lies within the Carson National Forest and is administered by the U.S. Forest Service rather than the Bureau of Land Management.

It is called Kay Pʼin (pronounced [kèː pʼìŋ], lit. 'bear mountain') by Tewa-speaking peoples in the Rio Grande valley, and is known as the mountain of the north in their cosmology.

== Geography ==
San Antonio Mountain is one of several volcanic peaks within the 7000 square kilometer Taos Plateau volcanic field, a region of volcanic activity within the Rio Grande rift valley. Other nearby peaks include Ute Mountain (10,082 feet), Cerro de la Olla (9,475 feet), Cerro del Aire (9,023 feet), and Cerro Montoso (8,655 feet). San Antonio Mountain is both the highest peak in the region and possesses the greatest relief, but it is shorter than the highest peaks in the surrounding ranges: Grouse Mesa (11,403 feet) in the Tusas Mountains to the west, and Wheeler Peak (13,161 feet) in the Sangre de Cristo Mountains to the east. However, because it stands alone, San Antonio Mountain is a distinctive feature that can be seen from as far as 60 or more miles away in southern Colorado and northern New Mexico.

San Antonio Mountain has a base diameter of five miles, and rises dramatically from the surrounding sagebrush plains of the lower San Luis Valley.

Forest Road 418 goes to the top, where there are radio and television towers. However it may not be open to motorized travel by the general public, as there is a locked gate where the road crosses private property. Hikers may walk around the private property.

=== Climate ===
Climate data for San Antonio Mountain 36.8596 N, 106.0263 W, Elevation: 10,794 ft (3,290 m) (1991–2020 normals)
Month	Jan	Feb	Mar	Apr	May	Jun	Jul	Aug	Sep	Oct	Nov	Dec	Year
Mean daily maximum °F (°C)	31.1 (−0.5)	32.0 (0.0)	38.6 (3.7)	44.2 (6.8)	53.3 (11.8)	65.0 (18.3)	68.8 (20.4)	66.3 (19.1)	60.3 (15.7)	50.0 (10.0)	38.2 (3.4)	31.0 (−0.6)	48.2 (9.0)
Daily mean °F (°C)	20.6 (−6.3)	21.2 (−6.0)	26.9 (−2.8)	32.3 (0.2)	41.3 (5.2)	51.9 (11.1)	56.2 (13.4)	54.4 (12.4)	48.5 (9.2)	38.7 (3.7)	28.0 (−2.2)	20.9 (−6.2)	36.7 (2.6)
Mean daily minimum °F (°C)	10.1 (−12.2)	10.4 (−12.0)	15.1 (−9.4)	20.4 (−6.4)	29.3 (−1.5)	38.9 (3.8)	43.6 (6.4)	42.5 (5.8)	36.7 (2.6)	27.3 (−2.6)	17.9 (−7.8)	10.8 (−11.8)	25.3 (−3.8)
Average precipitation inches (mm)	3.15 (80)	3.28 (83)	3.47 (88)	2.42 (61)	1.56 (40)	0.97 (25)	2.20 (56)	2.63 (67)	1.91 (49)	2.03 (52)	2.54 (65)	3.20 (81)	29.36 (747)
Source: PRISM Climate Group

== Geology ==
The mountain is a dacite dome, built up of lava high in silica and mildly elevated in alkali metal oxides that erupted between 3.36 and 2.9 million years ago. Most of the mountain consists of dacite flows up to 30 meters (100 ft) thick. These are glassy at their bases, massive and grey in their center sections, and blocky on the upper surfaces. These are sometimes oxidized to a red color. The mountain has north and south summits separated by a shallow saddle, with cinder and spatter around the southern summit that shows this was the youngest vent area. The mountain almost buries a slightly older and much smaller andesite cone to the northwest.

== Flora and fauna ==
The mountain features Gambel oak and ponderosa pine, with Douglas fir, Engelmann spruce, and quaking aspens at higher elevations.

San Antonio Mountain is an important winter habitat for migrating herds of elk, and hosts one of the largest populations of elk in New Mexico, estimated at 7,000 individuals. The mountain and its surroundings also provide habitat for pronghorn, golden eagle, hawks, bears, mountain lions, mule deer and white-tailed jackrabbits among other smaller mammals. In the fall, the Stuart Meadows wetlands on the nearby Rio San Antonio provide a stopover for migrating Sandhill cranes, mallards, American wigeon, Northern pintail, common yellowthroat, and sora.
