= Wild Rivers Recreation Area =

Coordinates: 36°40′47.12″N 105°40′23.03″W

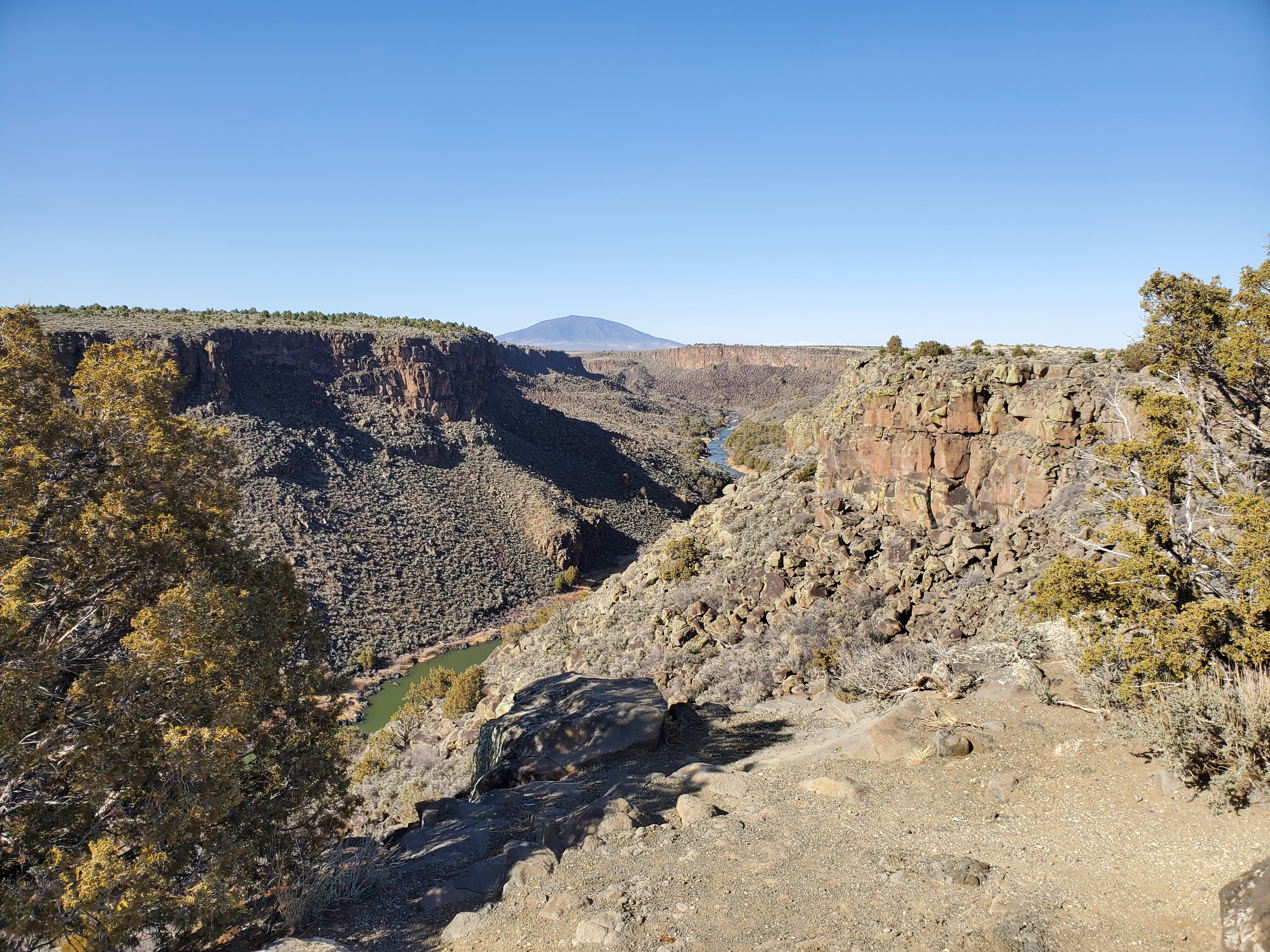
Rio Grande at Wild Rivers Recreation Area, New Mexico, March 2021

Wild Rivers Recreation Area is located in north central New Mexico within the Rio Grande del Norte National Monument. Two rivers that run through the park, the Rio Grande and Red River are National Wild and Scenic Rivers. NM 378 that traverses the recreation area is designated a New Mexico Scenic Byway. Recreational opportunities include whitewater rafting, hiking, biking, fishing and camping.

== Geography ==
The recreation area is located in the high plains 20 miles (32 km) from Questa. It is accessed via NM 378 off of NM 522. It is located west of the Sangre de Cristo Mountains, east of the Tusas Mountains on the Taos Plateau volcanic field. The Rio Grande and Red River, both designated National Wild and Scenic Rivers System, intersect in the park at an 800-foot (240 m) deep canyon. It has ancient forests of juniper and piñon trees. Geographic features include volcanic cones, black rock canyons, and cliffs.

== Description ==
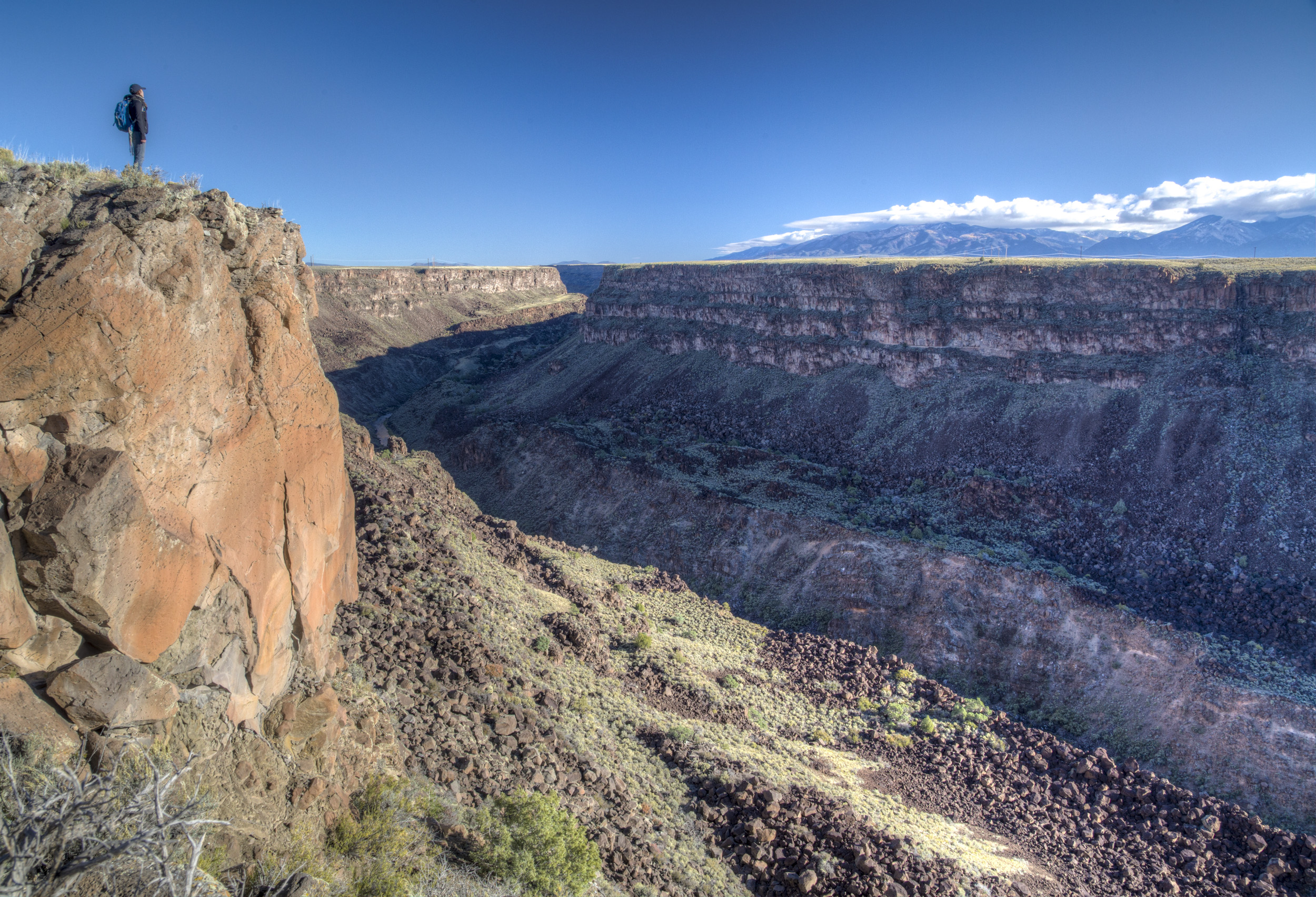
Wild Rivers Recreation Area

The recreation area has the following services:

- Visitor center
- Overlooks, including La Junta Point over the confluence of the Rio Grande and Red River
- A 13-mile back country byway
- Five campgrounds, picnic areas and restrooms
- Two group shelters
- Trails access the Taos plateau, Guadalupe Mountain, back country campsites or down to the river beds. Petroglyphs are visible on the walls of the gorge. Many of the trails begin at the campgrounds.

The recreation area is wheelchair accessible.

Wildlife in the park include mountain blue-birds, red-tail hawks, mule deer and prairie dogs. Fishing and boating is available with stipulations for fishing licenses, boating permits and other requirements. Mountain bikes may traverse roads and the Guadalupe Mountain Trail, Rinconada Loop Trail, and Red River Fault Trails. Whitewater rafting, kayaking, and rock climbing activities are also available at the park.

The recreation area is open throughout the year, but during the winter months road conditions should be checked prior to travel. The Visitor Center is open between Memorial Day and Labor Day.

== Wild Rivers Back Country Byway ==
The byway is a designated one of the New Mexico Scenic Byways and operated between an area two miles north of Questa and Cerro. The 13 mile byway—NM 378—has panoramic views that include many mountain peaks like Blanca Peak. It also provides access to park facilities, like the Wild Rivers visitor center and parking lots to campgrounds and trail heads.

== Administration ==
The recreation is managed by the Taos Field Office of the Bureau of Land Management.
