= Rio Grande Wild and Scenic River =

Protected river in New Mexico, United States

- IUCN category V (protected landscape/seascape)
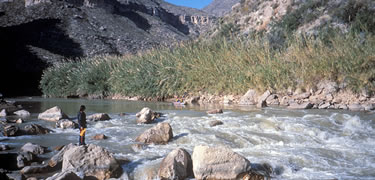
- Rio Grande - Wild and Scenic River

- Location within Texas Location within the United States
- Location: New Mexico and Texas
- Coordinates: 29°29′0″N 103°18′0″W
- Area: 9,600 acres (3,900 ha)
- Established: October 2, 1968
- Governing body: Bureau of Land Management, United States Forest Service, National Park Service
- Website: Rio Grande Wild and Scenic River

National Wild and Scenic River
- Type: Wild 150.1 miles (241.6 km); Scenic 108.5 miles (174.6 km); Recreational 0.8 miles (1.3 km)
- Designated: October 2, 1968

The Rio Grande Wild and Scenic River is a U.S. National Wild and Scenic River that protects 260 miles (420 km) of the Rio Grande in New Mexico and Texas, in the United States. The designation was first applied in 1968 to a 55.7-mile (89.6 km) stretch of the river in New Mexico; an additional 191.2 miles (307.7 km) of the river in Texas was added in 1978, followed by another 12.5 miles (20.1 km) in New Mexico in 1994.

The New Mexico portion of the Wild and Scenic River runs from the New Mexico–Colorado border approximately 68 miles (109 km) south. The lower 4 miles (6 km) of the Red River, a tributary of the Rio Grande in Taos County, New Mexico, was also added to the Wild and Scenic River System. The two rivers intersect in Wild Rivers Recreation Area.

Approximately 69 miles (111 km) of the Wild and Scenic River in Texas is within Big Bend National Park; the remainder is downstream of Big Bend. Three rugged canyons are preserved under this designation: Boquillas Canyon is the most accessible, as it can be reached via a popular RV campground; Mariscal Canyon can only be entered via a high-clearance four-wheel-drive vehicle; and entrance to the Lower Canyon, due to rapid size, is only possible by signing a National Park Service liability or "acknowledgement of risk" waiver. The Wild and Scenic River designation does not include Santa Elena Canyon, which is the most popular recreational area in Big Bend.

== Gallery ==
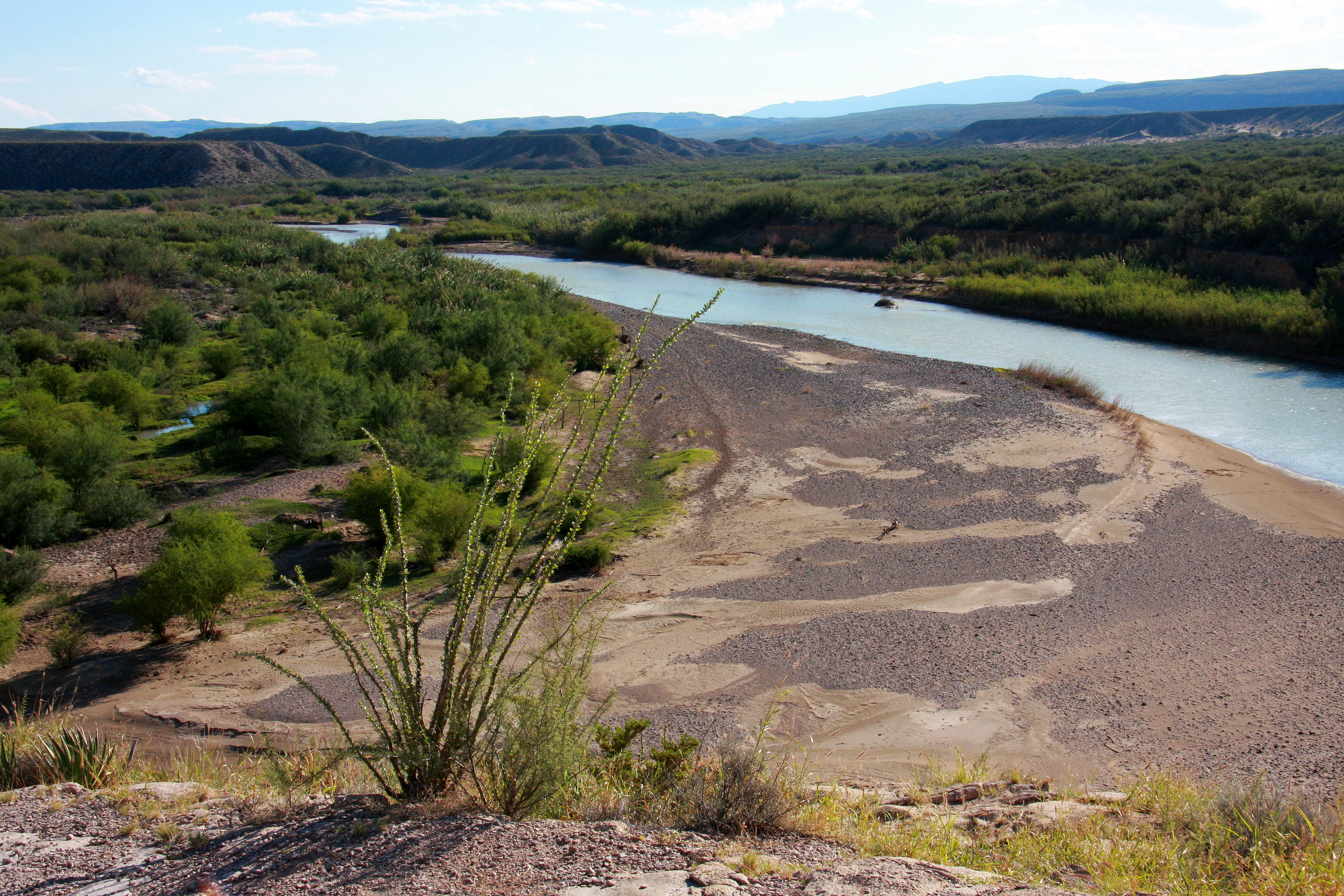
Rio Grande Bend near Boquillas Canyon

== See also ==
- List of National Wild and Scenic Rivers
