= Cerro, New Mexico =

The Village of Cerro
- Unincorporated community
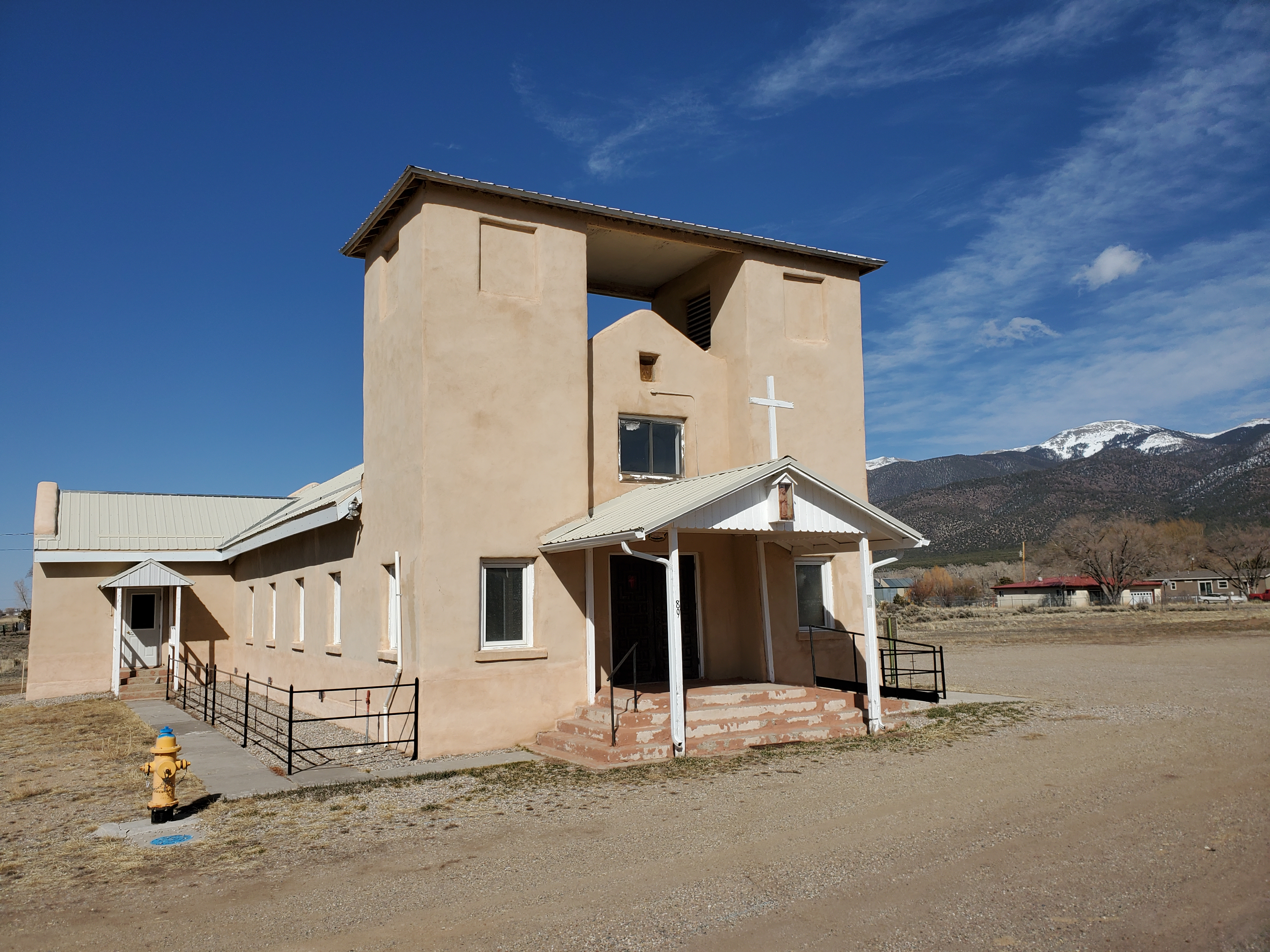
- Nuestra Senora de Guadalupe Catholic Church in Cerro, March 2021

- Location within New Mexico
- Coordinates: 36°45′25″N 105°37′16″W
- Country: United States
- State: New Mexico
- County: Taos
- Elevation: 7,602 ft (2,317 m)

Population (2000)
  - Total: 428
- Time zone: UTC-7 (Mountain (MST))
  - Summer (DST): UTC-6 (MDT)
- ZIP code: 87519
- Area code: 575
- GNIS feature ID: 904926
- Website: http://www.laplaza.org/government/cerro/

Cerro is an unincorporated community in Taos County, New Mexico, United States located along New Mexico State Road 378. It was founded in 1854 by settlers from Taos and Questa and was named for Cerro Guadalupe.

== Climate ==
According to the Köppen Climate Classification system, Cerro has a warm-summer humid continental climate, abbreviated "Dfb" on climate maps. The hottest temperature recorded in Cerro was 100 °F (37.8 °C) on June 19, 1924, while the coldest temperature recorded was −34 °F (−36.7 °C) on January 29, 1919, and January 6, 1971.

Climate data for Cerro, New Mexico, 1991–2020 normals, extremes 1910–2022
Month	Jan	Feb	Mar	Apr	May	Jun	Jul	Aug	Sep	Oct	Nov	Dec	Year
Record high °F (°C)	63 (17)	65 (18)	77 (25)	82 (28)	95 (35)	100 (38)	97 (36)	98 (37)	96 (36)	88 (31)	77 (25)	68 (20)	100 (38)
Mean maximum °F (°C)	50.3 (10.2)	54.2 (12.3)	67.3 (19.6)	73.0 (22.8)	80.4 (26.9)	88.6 (31.4)	90.4 (32.4)	87.8 (31.0)	84.2 (29.0)	76.3 (24.6)	64.3 (17.9)	53.2 (11.8)	91.5 (33.1)
Mean daily maximum °F (°C)	36.8 (2.7)	42.1 (5.6)	53.1 (11.7)	61.7 (16.5)	69.8 (21.0)	80.1 (26.7)	83.0 (28.3)	80.5 (26.9)	75.1 (23.9)	64.6 (18.1)	50.9 (10.5)	37.9 (3.3)	61.3 (16.3)
Daily mean °F (°C)	22.3 (−5.4)	28.1 (−2.2)	37.1 (2.8)	44.4 (6.9)	52.4 (11.3)	62.1 (16.7)	66.1 (18.9)	64.3 (17.9)	58.3 (14.6)	47.2 (8.4)	34.9 (1.6)	23.5 (−4.7)	45.1 (7.2)
Mean daily minimum °F (°C)	7.9 (−13.4)	14.0 (−10.0)	21.0 (−6.1)	27.0 (−2.8)	35.1 (1.7)	44.0 (6.7)	49.2 (9.6)	48.2 (9.0)	41.4 (5.2)	29.7 (−1.3)	18.9 (−7.3)	9.0 (−12.8)	28.8 (−1.8)
Mean minimum °F (°C)	−10.7 (−23.7)	−5.6 (−20.9)	3.2 (−16.0)	13.4 (−10.3)	22.5 (−5.3)	32.2 (0.1)	40.7 (4.8)	40.6 (4.8)	28.4 (−2.0)	13.8 (−10.1)	0.6 (−17.4)	−9.1 (−22.8)	−14.5 (−25.8)
Record low °F (°C)	−34 (−37)	−33 (−36)	−16 (−27)	−6 (−21)	11 (−12)	22 (−6)	25 (−4)	30 (−1)	18 (−8)	−3 (−19)	−20 (−29)	−30 (−34)	−34 (−37)
Average precipitation inches (mm)	0.67 (17)	0.66 (17)	0.91 (23)	0.97 (25)	1.12 (28)	0.67 (17)	1.68 (43)	2.25 (57)	1.68 (43)	1.04 (26)	0.81 (21)	0.91 (23)	13.37 (340)
Average snowfall inches (cm)	12.7 (32)	11.7 (30)	8.0 (20)	4.3 (11)	0.7 (1.8)	0.0 (0.0)	0.0 (0.0)	0.0 (0.0)	0.0 (0.0)	3.4 (8.6)	6.8 (17)	13.9 (35)	61.5 (155.4)
Average precipitation days (≥ 0.01 in)	4.4	4.4	4.4	4.7	4.9	3.5	8.5	9.6	6.1	4.4	4.2	4.5	63.6
Average snowy days (≥ 0.1 in)	3.9	3.5	2.4	1.6	0.2	0.0	0.0	0.0	0.0	1.0	2.4	3.9	18.9
Source 1: NOAA
Source 2: National Weather Service

== See also ==
- Wild Rivers Recreation Area
