= New Mexico State Road 378 =

State highway in New Mexico, United States

State Road 378
- NM 378 highlighted in red

Route information
- Maintained by NMDOT
- Length: 3.4 mi (5.5 km)
- Tourist routes: Part of Wild Rivers Back Country Byway

Major junctions
- West end: edge of BLM land
- East end: NM 522 north of Questa

Location
- Country: United States
- State: New Mexico
- Counties: Taos

Highway system
- New Mexico State Highway System; Interstate; US; State; Scenic
← NM 377	→ US 380

State Road 378 (NM 378) is a 3.4-mile-long (5.5 km) state highway in far northern New Mexico. Beginning at a junction with NM 522, NM 378 heads generally west through the small town of Cerro and officially ends shortly thereafter at the boundary of BLM lands. The paved surface continues a few miles further under a different designation to end at the BLM's Wild Rivers National Recreation Area.

== Major intersections ==
The entire route is in Taos County.

Location	mi	km	Destinations	Notes
	0.000	0.000	edge of BLM land	Western terminus
	3.400	5.472	NM 522	Eastern terminus
1.000 mi = 1.609 km; 1.000 km = 0.621 mi
