= Rio Grande Gorge =

Canyon in New Mexico, United States

Coordinates: 36.47652°N 105.73380°W

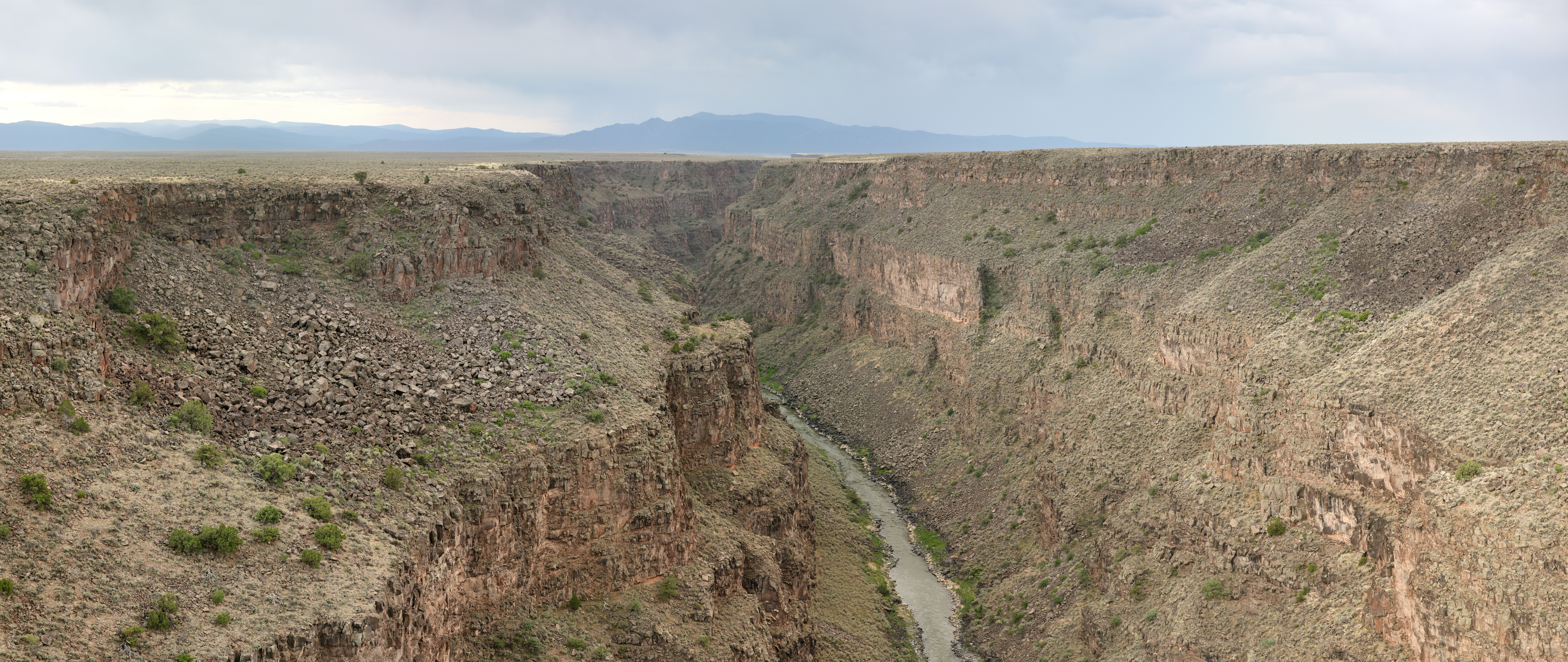
Rio Grande Gorge

The Rio Grande Gorge is a geological feature in northern New Mexico where the watercourse of the Rio Grande follows an eroded chasm. Beginning near the Colorado border, the approximately 50-mile (80 km) gorge runs from northwest to southwest of Taos, New Mexico, through the basalt flows of the Taos Plateau volcanic field. The gorge depth is 800 feet (240 m) just south of the Rio Grande Gorge Bridge, which spans the gorge 10 miles (16 km) northwest of Taos.

== Geology ==
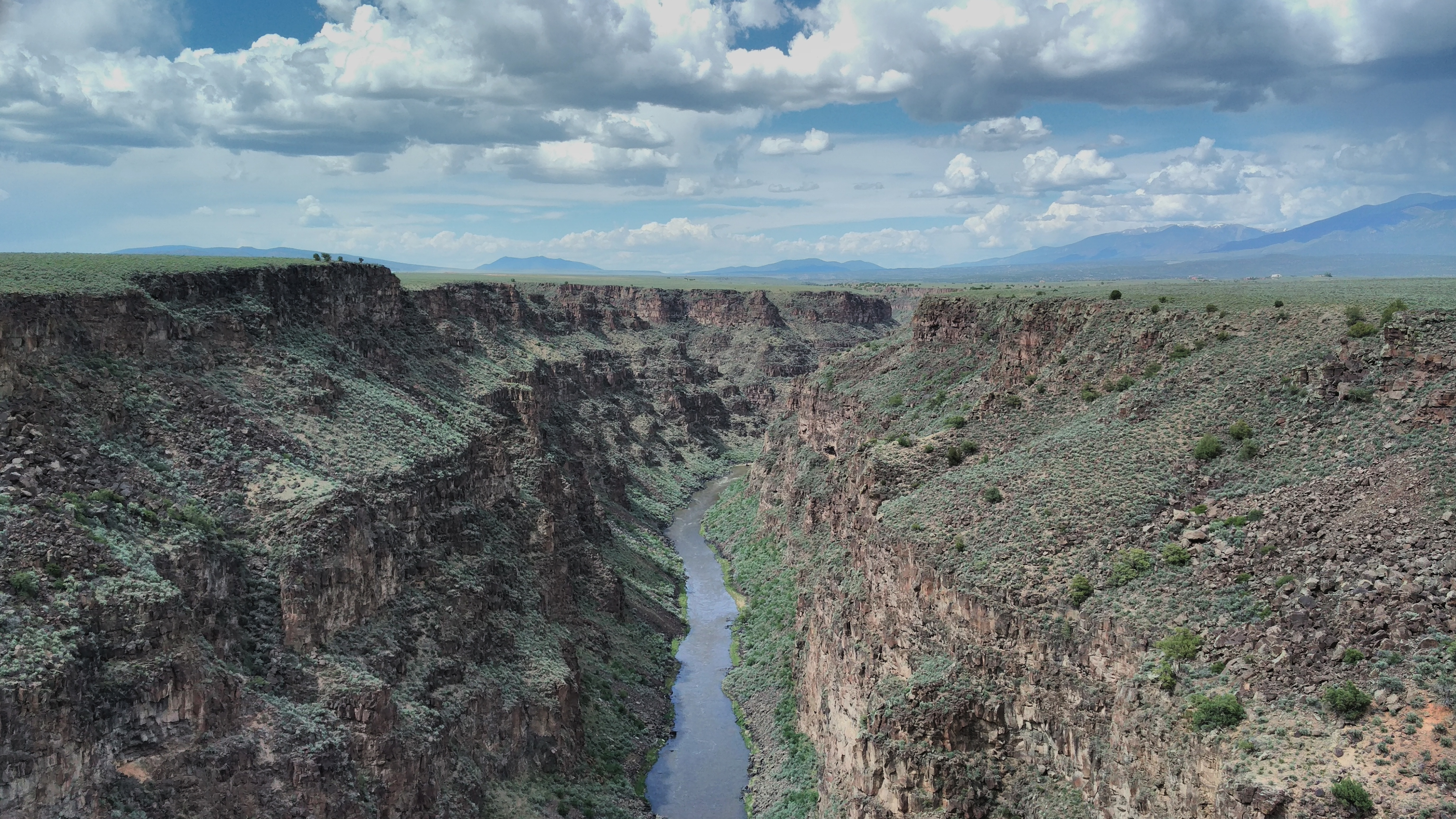

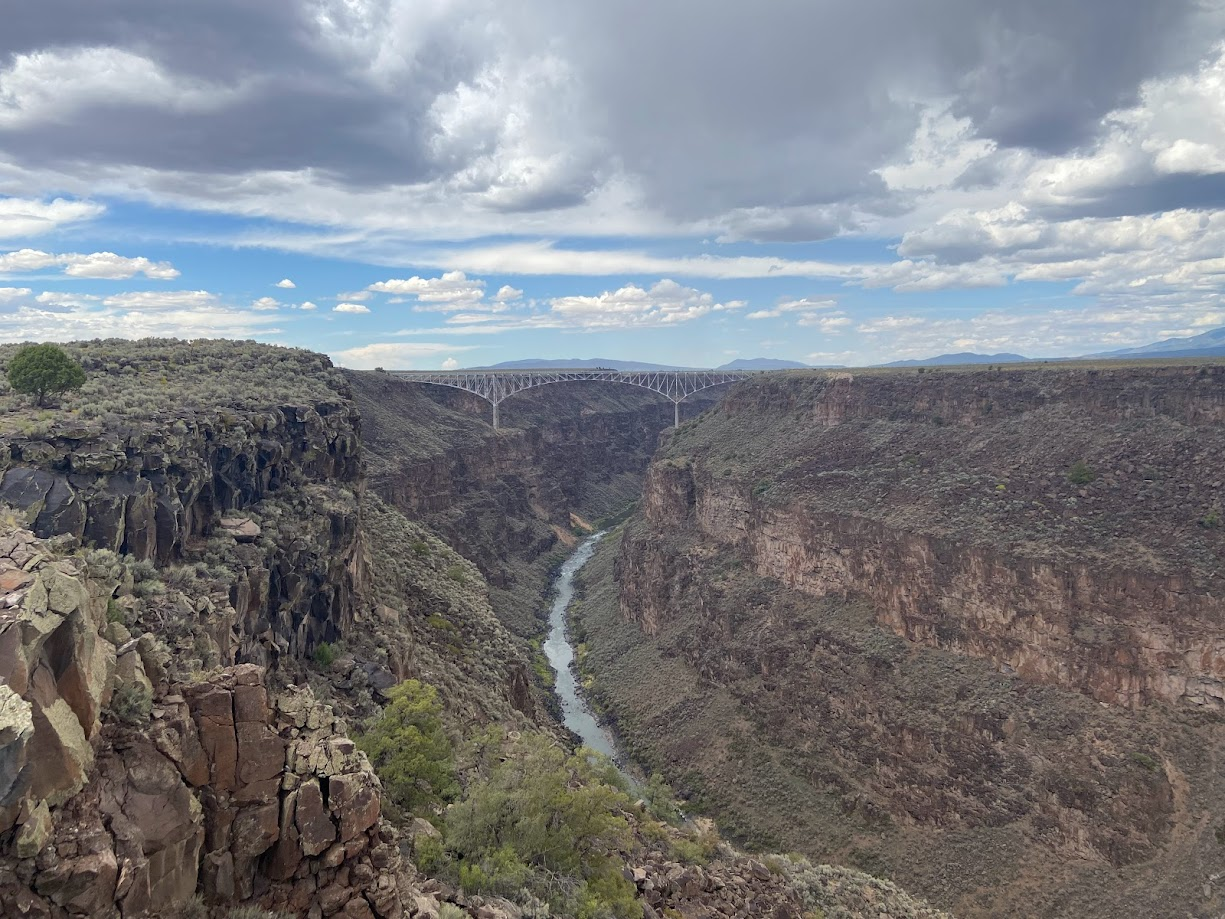
Rio Grande Gorge Bridge

Geologically, the Rio Grande Gorge is a canyon, carved out by erosion over the last several million years. The Rio Grande Gorge and its river follow a topographical low within the larger Rio Grande Rift; a mixture of volcanic activity, shifting tectonic plates, and erosion of layers of gravels and lava yielded the recognizable narrow, deep gorge visible today.

== Ecosystem ==
The canyon ecosystem descends 800 feet (240 m) from rim to river, creating a unique diversity in plant and animal life. Ancient piñon and juniper forests are home to 500-year-old trees. Wildlife include mule deer, red-tailed hawk, mountain blue-bird, prairie dog and big horn sheep.

The climate is semi-arid with summer thunderstorms common in July and August, and snow possible from November through March. Summer temperatures range from 45 to 90 °F (7 to 32 °C) and winter temperatures range from −15 to 45 °F (−26 to 7 °C).

== National Wild and Scenic River ==
In 1968, the Rio Grande was among the first eight rivers the US Congress designated into the National Wild and Scenic Rivers System to protect outstanding resources values. The Wild and Scenic River flows through the Rio Grande Gorge Recreation Area. The recreation areas include the Wild Rivers area in the north and the Orilla Verde area in the south, which provide hiking, boating, fishing and camping facilities.

== Rio Grande del Norte National Monument ==
The gorge and 242,500 acres (98,100 ha) of surrounding land was designated a national monument, Rio Grande del Norte National Monument, on March 25, 2013.

== Whitewater ==
The gorge has Class II to Class V white water rapids that are managed for recreation by The U.S. Bureau of Land Management (BLM). The BLM maintains two developed recreation areas along the river that include hiking, biking and other recreational opportunities. In New Mexico, The Rio Grande has two main sections for rafting near Taos: the Taos Box and the Racecourse Run. The Taos Box, a more dramatic, deep canyon, is famous for its big, technical Class IV rapids, while the Racecourse Run is a Class III stretch better suited for first-time rafters and families.

== History ==
The gorge is also the site of many ancient petroglyphs. At the bottom of the gorge, the Rio Grande is flanked by hidden hot springs and many ruins. The former Chili Line also ran there.

== Astronaut training ==
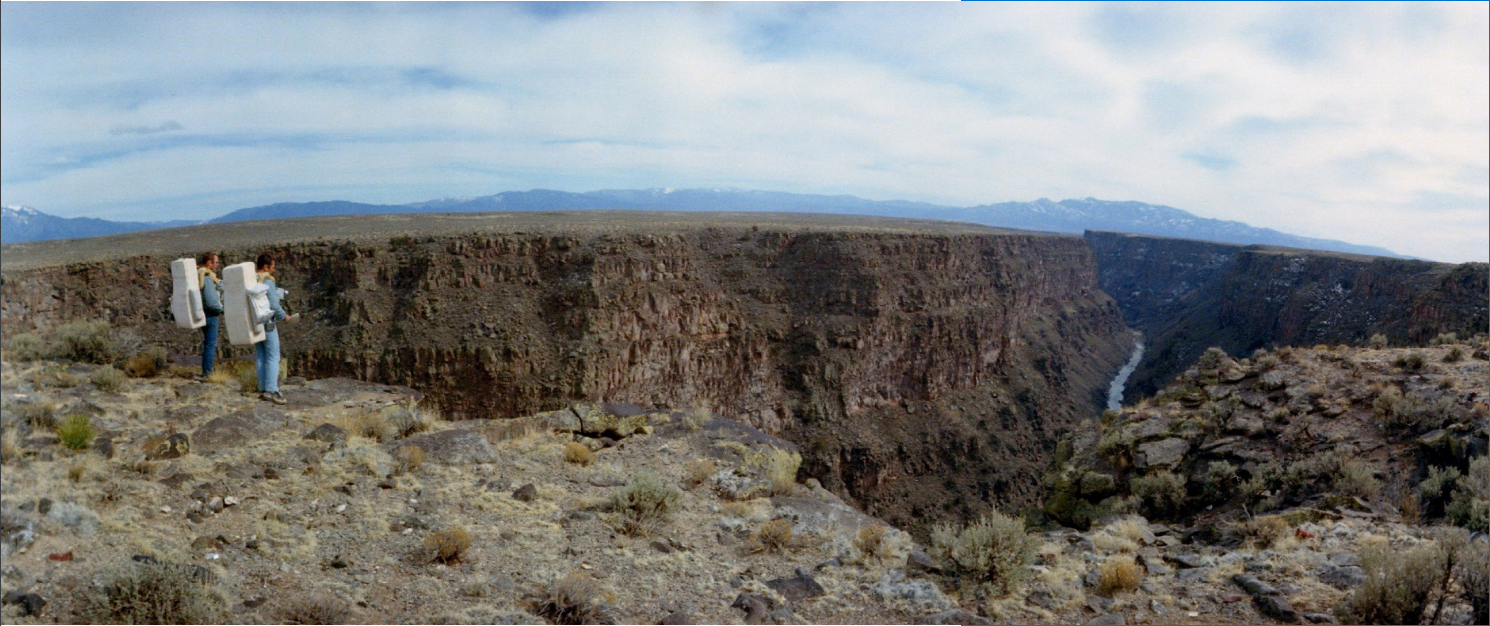
Scott and Irwin training at Rio Grande Gorge in March 1971

NASA geologically trained the Apollo Astronauts at the site in March and Sept. 1971, because of the striking similarities to the Apollo 15 landing site. Astronauts who would use this training on the Moon included Apollo 15's David Scott and James Irwin, Apollo 16's John Young and Charlie Duke, and Apollo 17's Jack Schmitt. Notable geologist instructors included William R. Muehlberger.

== See also ==
- Rio Grande Trail
