= Alamosa Formation =

Geologic formation in Colorado, United States

- Stratigraphic range: Pleistocene
- Type: Formation

Location
- Region: Colorado
- Country: United States

The Alamosa Formation is a geologic formation in Colorado. It preserves fossils. The formation was deposited by Lake Alamosa, a paleolake that existed from the Pliocene to the middle Pleistocene.

== See also ==
- List of fossiliferous stratigraphic units in Colorado
- Paleontology in Colorado
