= Ute Mountain (New Mexico) =

Mountain in New Mexico, United States

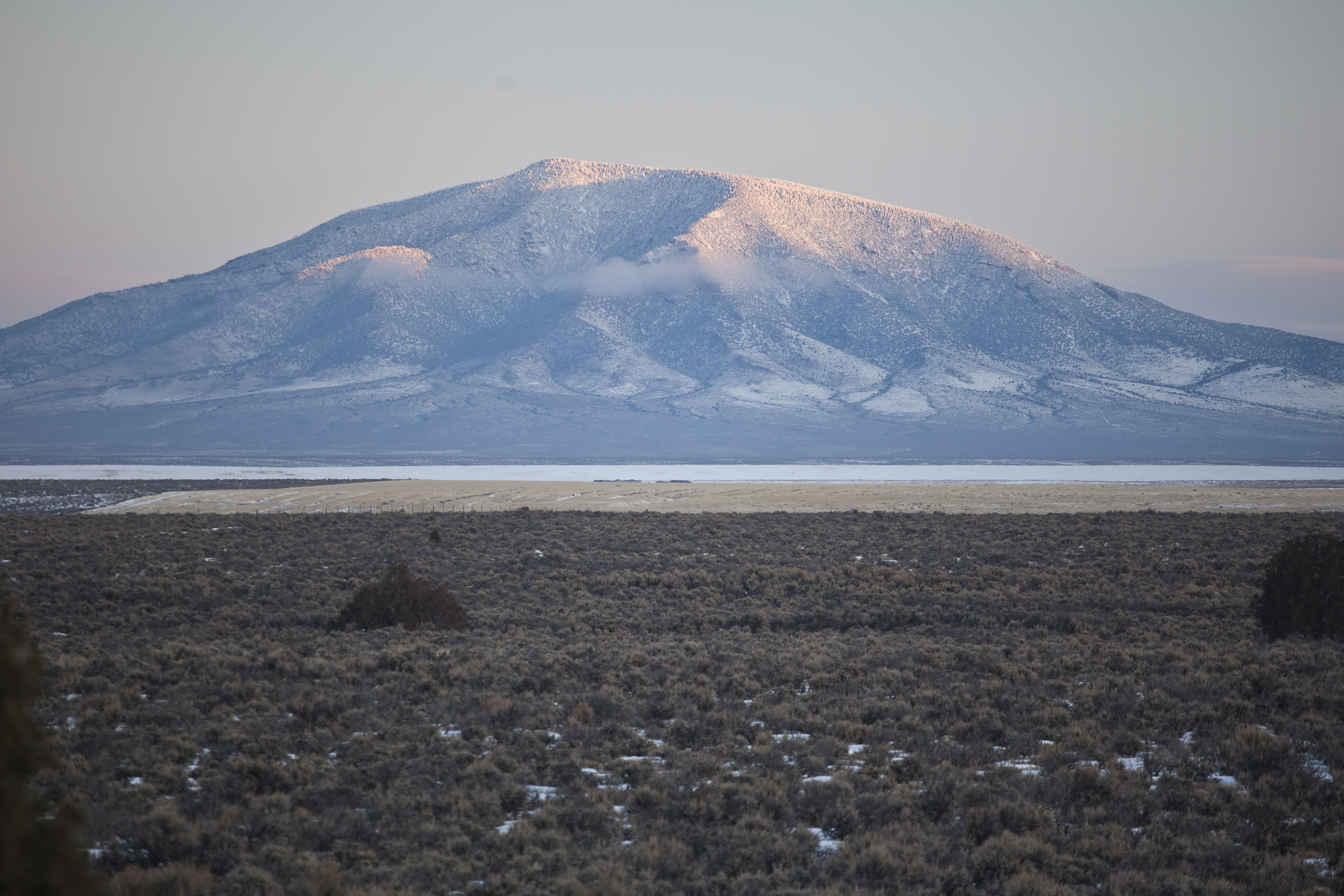
- South aspect

Highest point
- Elevation: 10,093 ft (3,076 m)
- Prominence: 2,483 ft (757 m)
- Isolation: 10.75 mi (17.30 km)
- Listing: Highest major summits of the US
- Coordinates: 36°56′15″N 105°41′02″W

Naming
- Etymology: Ute

Geography
- Location within New Mexico Location within the United States
- Location: Rio Grande del Norte National Monument
- Country: United States of America
- State: New Mexico
- County: Taos
- Parent range: Sangre de Cristo Mountains; Rocky Mountains
- Topo map: USGS Ute Mountain

Geology
- Rock age: 3.9 Million years
- Mountain type: volcanic cone
- Rock type: Dacite
- Volcanic field: Taos Plateau volcanic field

Climbing
- Easiest route: class 2 hiking

Ute Mountain is a 10,093-foot elevation (3,076 m) summit located in Taos County, New Mexico, United States.

== Description ==
Ute Mountain is part of the Taos Mountains which are a subset of the Sangre de Cristo Mountains. The isolated landmark is the highest point of the Cerro del Yuta Wilderness and Rio Grande del Norte National Monument which is administered by the Bureau of Land Management. The remote mountain is situated 35 miles north of the town of Taos and four miles south of the New Mexico–Colorado border. Ute Mountain is a free-standing, dacitic, extinct Pliocene volcanic cone set within the Taos Plateau volcanic field. Ute Mountain has a base diameter of five miles and topographic relief is significant as the summit rises 2,500 feet (760 meters) above the surrounding sagebrush-covered basalt plains. The slopes of the mountain are covered with stands of pinyon pine, ponderosa pine, aspen and Douglas fir. Precipitation runoff from the mountain drains to the Rio Grande which flows through a gorge along the western base of the mountain.

== Etymology ==
The mountain is also known in Spanish as "Cerro del Yuta" (Mountain of the Ute). The origin of the word Ute is unknown; it is first attested as Yuta in Spanish documents. The mountain is named after the Ute people whose self-designation is Núuchi-u, meaning 'the people'. The state of Utah is also named after the Ute people. This landform's toponym has been officially adopted by the United States Board on Geographic Names, and has appeared in publications since at least 1875.

== Gallery ==
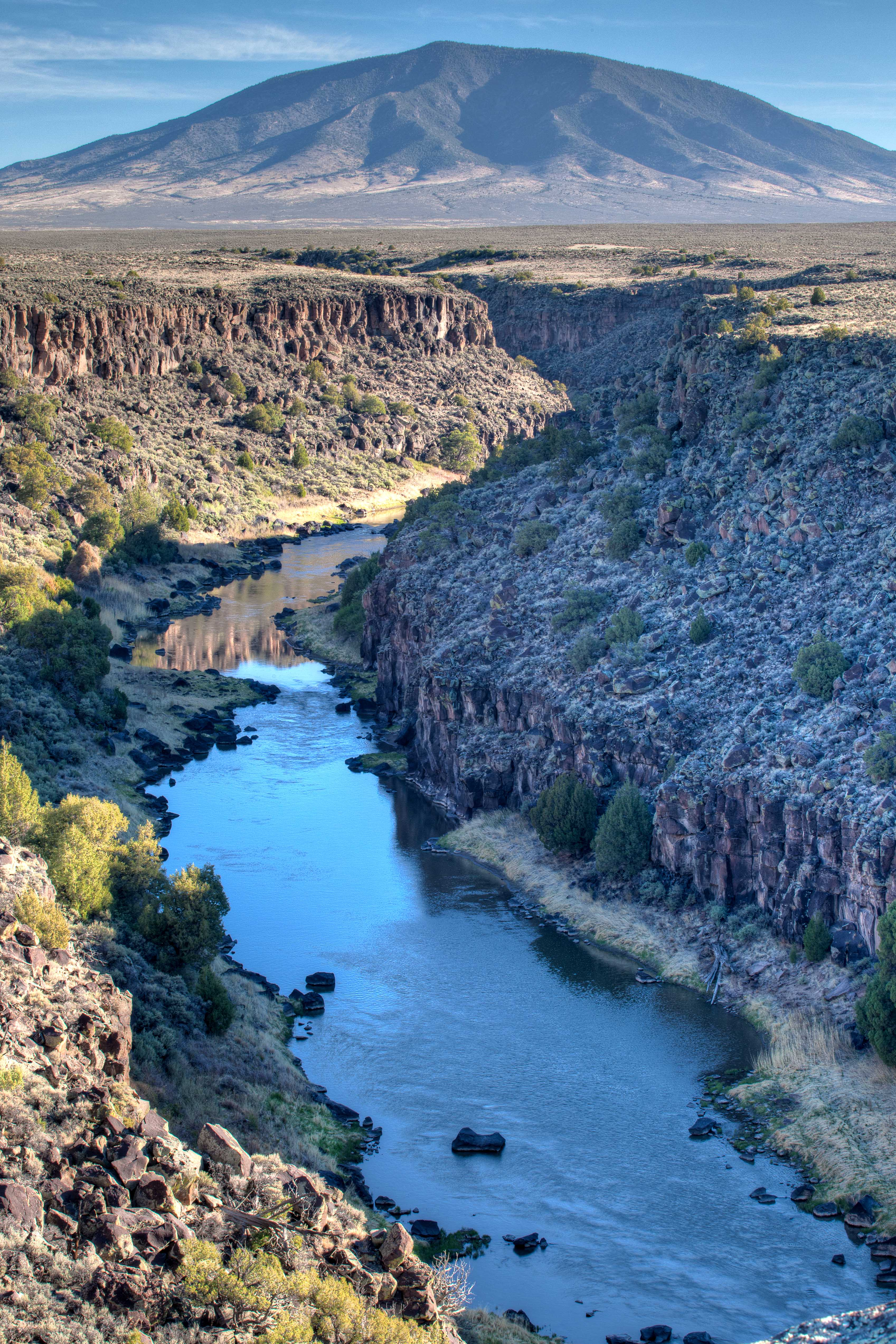
Ute Mountain and Rio Grande

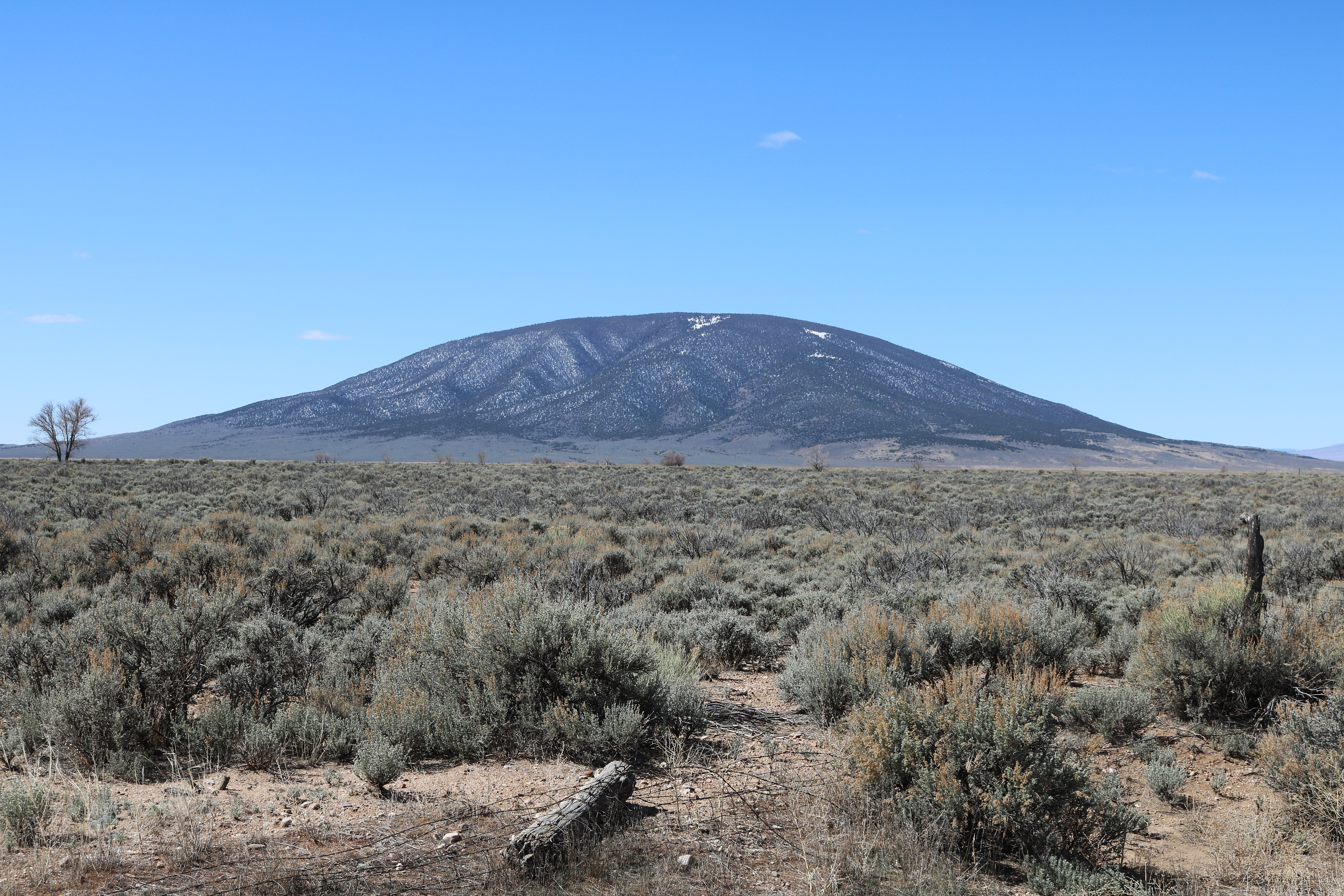
Northeast aspect from Jaroso, Colorado

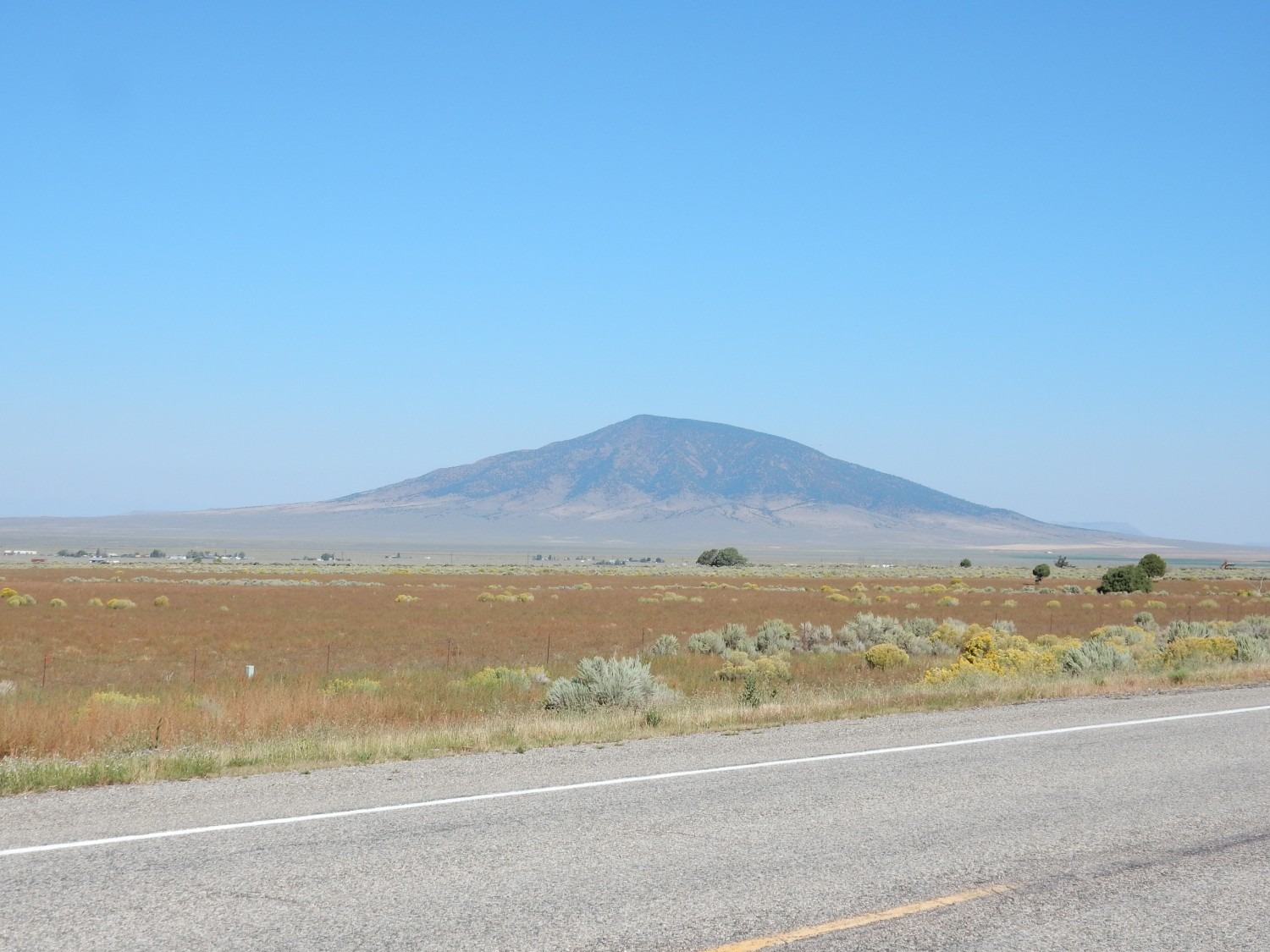

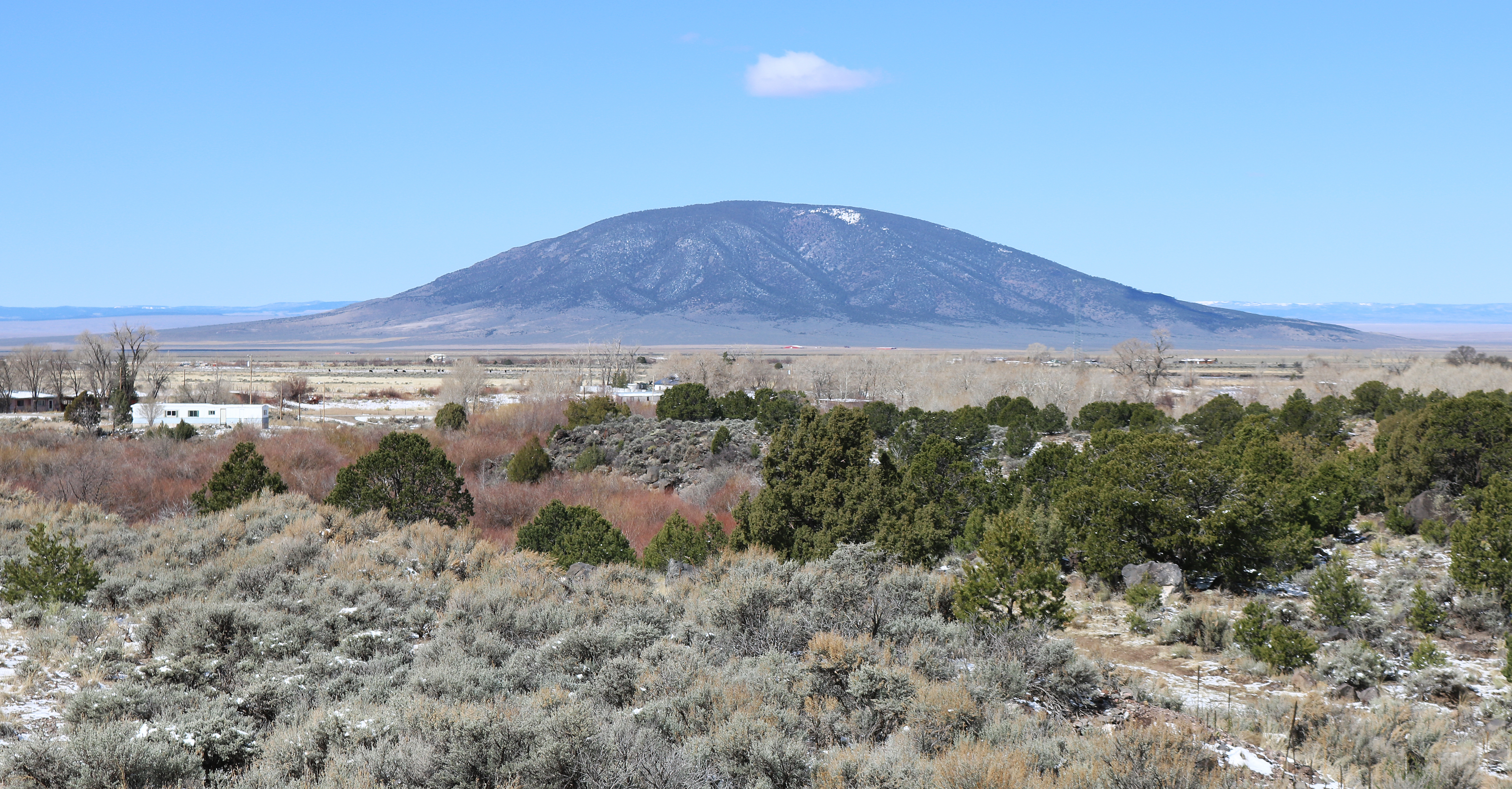
East aspect from Costilla, New Mexico

== See also ==
- List of mountain peaks of New Mexico
- Rio Grande rift
