= Questa, New Mexico =

Village in Taos County, New Mexico, United States

Questa
- Village
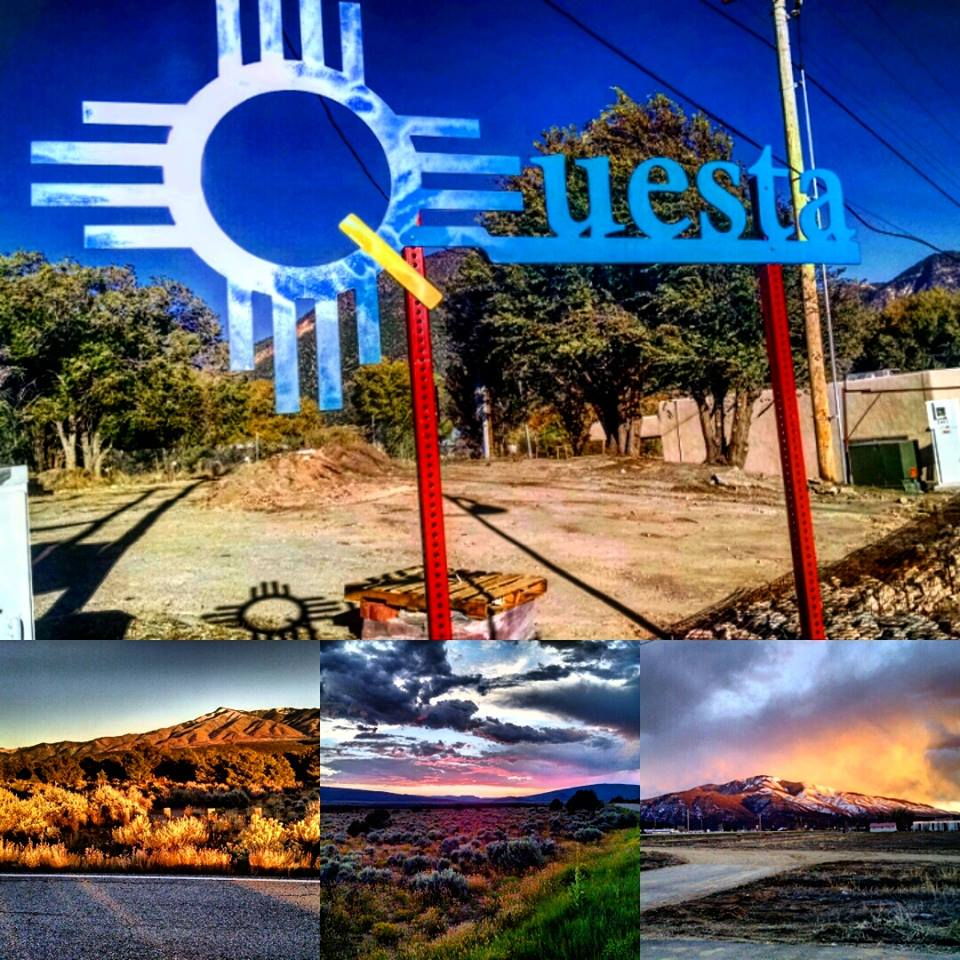
- Questa, NM and scenic views
- Motto: Gateway to the Rio Grande del Norte National Monument
- Location of Questa, New Mexico

- Location in the United States
- Coordinates: 36°42′23″N 105°36′30″W
- Country: United States
- State: New Mexico
- County: Taos

Government
  - Type: Municipal
  - Mayor: John Anthony Ortega

Area
  - Total: 7.59 sq mi (19.66 km^{2})
  - Land: 7.08 sq mi (18.33 km^{2})
  - Water: 0.51 sq mi (1.33 km^{2})
- Elevation: 7,615 ft (2,321 m)

Population (2020)
  - Total: 1,742
  - Density: 246.2/sq mi (95.04/km^{2})
- Time zone: UTC-7 (Mountain (MST))
  - Summer (DST): UTC-6 (MDT)
- ZIP code: 87556
- Area code: 575
- FIPS code: 35-60870
- GNIS feature ID: 2413580
- Website: http://questa-nm.com/

Questa is a village in Taos County, New Mexico, United States. As of the 2020 census, Questa had a population of 1,742. The village has trails into the Rio Grande Gorge, trout fishing, and mountain lakes with trails that access the Sangre de Cristo Mountains that overlook the area. Questa is on the Enchanted Circle Scenic Byway, near the confluence of the Rio Grande and the Red River. The "Gateway to the Rio Grande del Norte Monument", its visitors can drive to an overlook of the Red River meeting the Rio Grande in the depth of the gorge. The Carson National Forest parallels Questa to the east. The Columbine Hondo Wilderness and Latir Peak Wildness are in the Carson National Forest close to Questa.

With a large Hispanic population, the village economy was historically largely dependent on agriculture and income from a now-closed Chevron molybdenum mine. Many residents also commute to Taos, Red River, and Angel Fire to work in the hospitality industries there.

== Geography ==
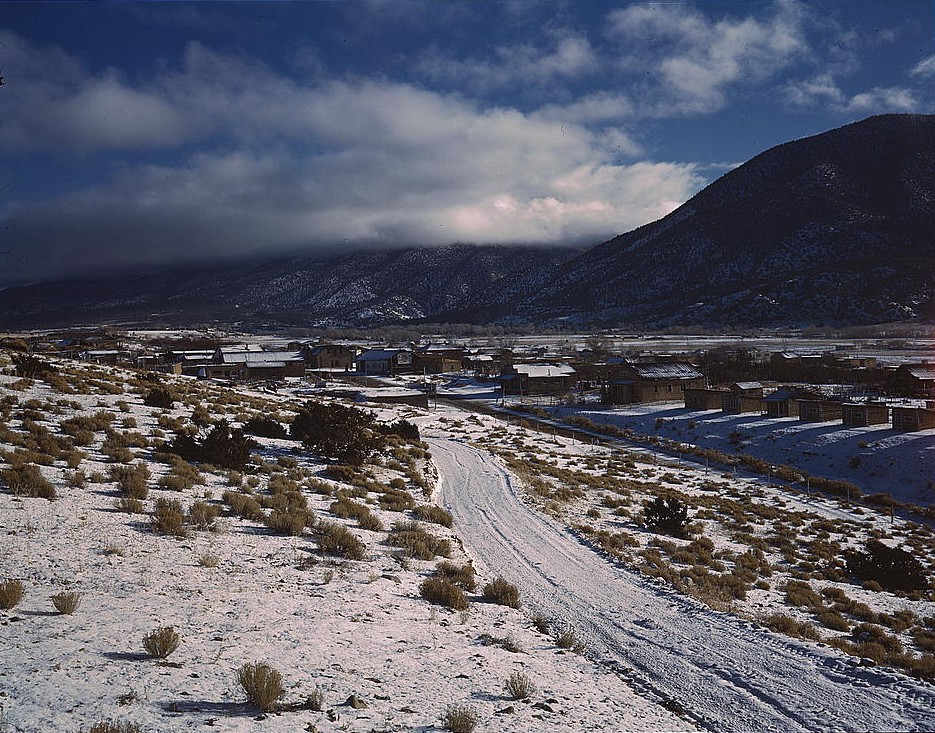
Questa 1943

According to the United States Census Bureau, the village has a total area of 5.1 square miles (13 km^{2}), all land. The village is a regional hub for the smaller outlying communities of Lama, Cerro, Sunshine Valley, Latir, Costilla, and Amalia. Questa is surrounded by the Rio Grande del Norte National Monument to the west and the Carson National Forest to the East.

Questa lies at the western base of the Taos Mountains, part of the Sangre de Cristo Mountains. Rising above the town to the northeast is the Latir Peak massif, headed by Venado Peak, 12,734 ft (3,881 m); Pinabete Peak, a southwestern outlier of the group, rises closest to Questa. To the southeast lies Flag Mountain, a northwestern spur of the group of mountains that includes Wheeler Peak, the highest peak in New Mexico. To the north and west lie the Rio Grande Gorge, cutting a volcanic plateau dotted with several peaks of volcanic origin in the Rio Grande del Norte National Monument.

== History ==
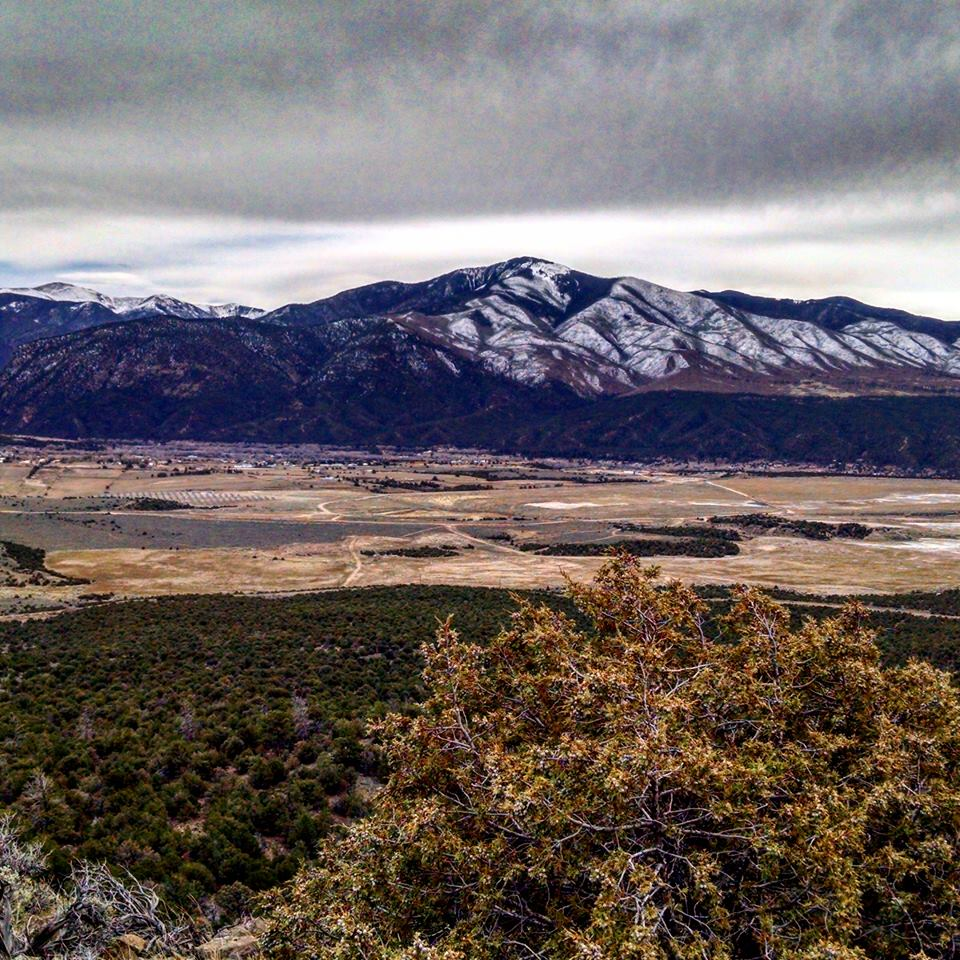
Overview of the Village of Questa looking from west to east from the Rio Grande del Norte National Monument Las Vistas de Questa Trail

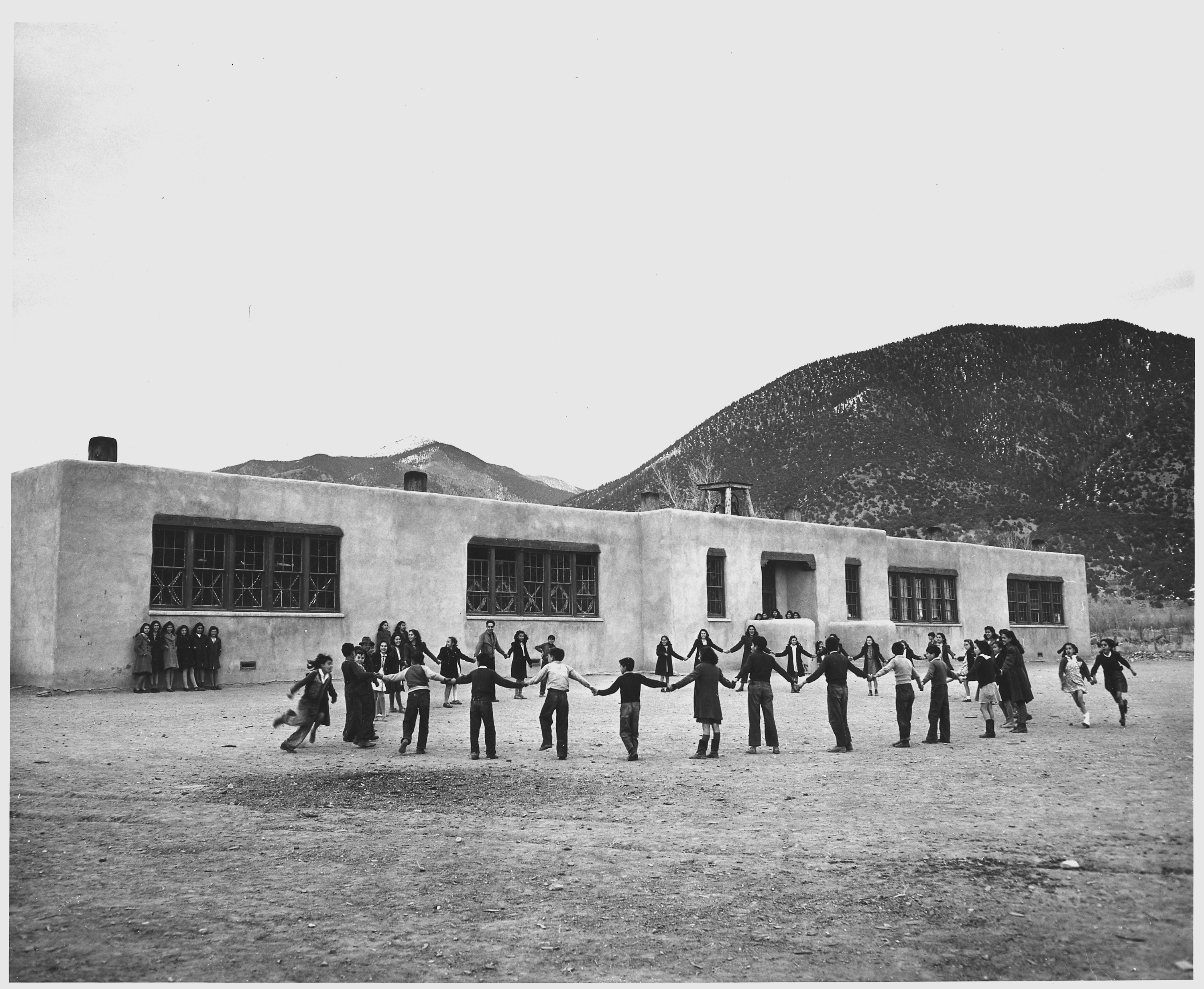
School at Questa in 1941

Questa was originally named San Antonio del Rio Colorado. In 1883, a U.S. postmaster changed its name to Questa. The postmaster misspelled the name, as it should have been spelled "Cuesta," which is Spanish for "ridge" or "slope." Despite the error, the village has kept the name.

The Oshara tradition dated to about 3000 BCE is the first known archaeological evidence of Native American (Indians) residence near Questa. The Oshara were possibly the ancestors of the present day Pueblo peoples. A later trade route, called the "Kiowa Trail" or the Taos Mountain Trail, ran through Questa and connected the agricultural Pueblo peoples in New Mexico to the bison-hunting Plains Indians on the Great Plains of Colorado. The first Spaniards to visit the area were members of the Coronado expedition who visited Taos Pueblo, 20 mi (32 km) south of Questa, in 1540.

The Spanish settlement of Don Fernando de Taos adjacent to Taos Pueblo was founded about 1615. Thereafter, Spanish expeditions and hunters and miners probably visited the Questa area although the first documented visit by the Spanish was not until July 1694. In that year, Governor Diego de Vargas led an expedition northward from Santa Fe in search of food for the destitute Spanish colony. Vargas confiscated grain from several Pueblo villages, but on arriving in Taos, decided to return to Santa Fe via a roundabout route northward to avoid conflict with the Puebloans. Vargas and his expedition of 100 men passed by the future site of Questa along the "Rio Colorado" (Red River of New Mexico). He noted that the area was inhabited by the "Apaches de Acho". Utes, who were hostile to the Spanish, also lived nearby. Bison were plentiful in the region. The hostility of the Ute and Apache – and later the Comanche – prevented Spanish expansion northward from Taos to Questa.

The site of Questa was first called Rio Colorado. Concerned about encroachments by French and American fur trappers and traders, the Spaniards established a short-lived military post at the Rio Colorado in about 1815. In the same year a land grant from the Governor of New Mexico granted 50 families permission to establish a settlement at Rio Colorado. In 1817, the military in Rio Colorado refused entry into New Mexico and arrested French/American traders Auguste Pierre Chouteau and Jules de Mun and confiscated their goods. By 1822, the settlement was abandoned "for feer of the Indeans now at War With them."

Mexican independence from Spain in 1821 resulted in a more tolerant attitude toward Americans by the New Mexican government. By 1829, Rio Colorado had been resettled, mostly by Hispanics but also by a few French/Americans. The New Mexican government encouraged settlement on its frontiers by land grants to Mexican citizens (which included many of Anglo and French descent). Large grants of land were made to prospective settlers in 1836 and 1841 and the town of San Antonio del Rio Colorado was legally established in 1842.

New Mexico became part of the United States after the Mexican-American War from 1846 to 1848. Indian raids in the area continued until the 1860s. The location of the village astride ancient trade, raiding, and hunting routes, made resource-based conflict between cultures inevitable. Additionally, the village location blocked access to certain historic clay and pigment quarries of ceremonial importance to the Taos tribe. This continued conflict led to the village being repeatedly abandoned. Spanish, Mexican, and eventually American soldiers detailed to defend the beleaguered settlement frequently expressed great frustration with their posting.

The names of two prominent peaks overlooking the village of Questa, Flag Mountain and Sentinel Peak, refer to the practice during this period of stationing watchmen on these high points to warn the village of approaching war parties.

The village, nearly from the beginning, was of mixed blood; the surnames Lafore or Laforet, Ledoux, and LaCome reflect the names of French or French-Canadian trappers who settled in the area after arriving in search of otter and beaver. New Mexico territory license records list Auguste Lacome as residing in the area as a trader with the surrounding Native Americans. The common surname Rael may also reflect the influence of Jewish immigrants arriving after being expelled from Spain. The village had a reputation for being contentious and requiring disproportionate effort to police; records show that viceregal intervention was frequently required to settle property disputes.

== Arts and culture ==
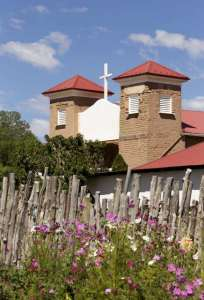
Historic San Antonio del Rio Colorado Church of Questa

The Historic San Antonio del Rio Colorado Church is in the historic plaza of Questa, present since the mid-1800s. After a collapse of the west wall in Questa's historic church, the community is restoring it. Made with adobe and woodwork, it was scheduled to be completed mid-2016.

Questa has Ocho, an art gallery and event space.

=== Event series ===
Questa has a summer event series that celebrates art, youth, and the environment in special sub-themed events, including Mud Bogg, the Questa Fiesta, and Alumbra de Questa.

== Parks and recreation ==
Questa has two local parks: the Municipal Park and the Moly Park. The Moly Park contains public athletic fields.

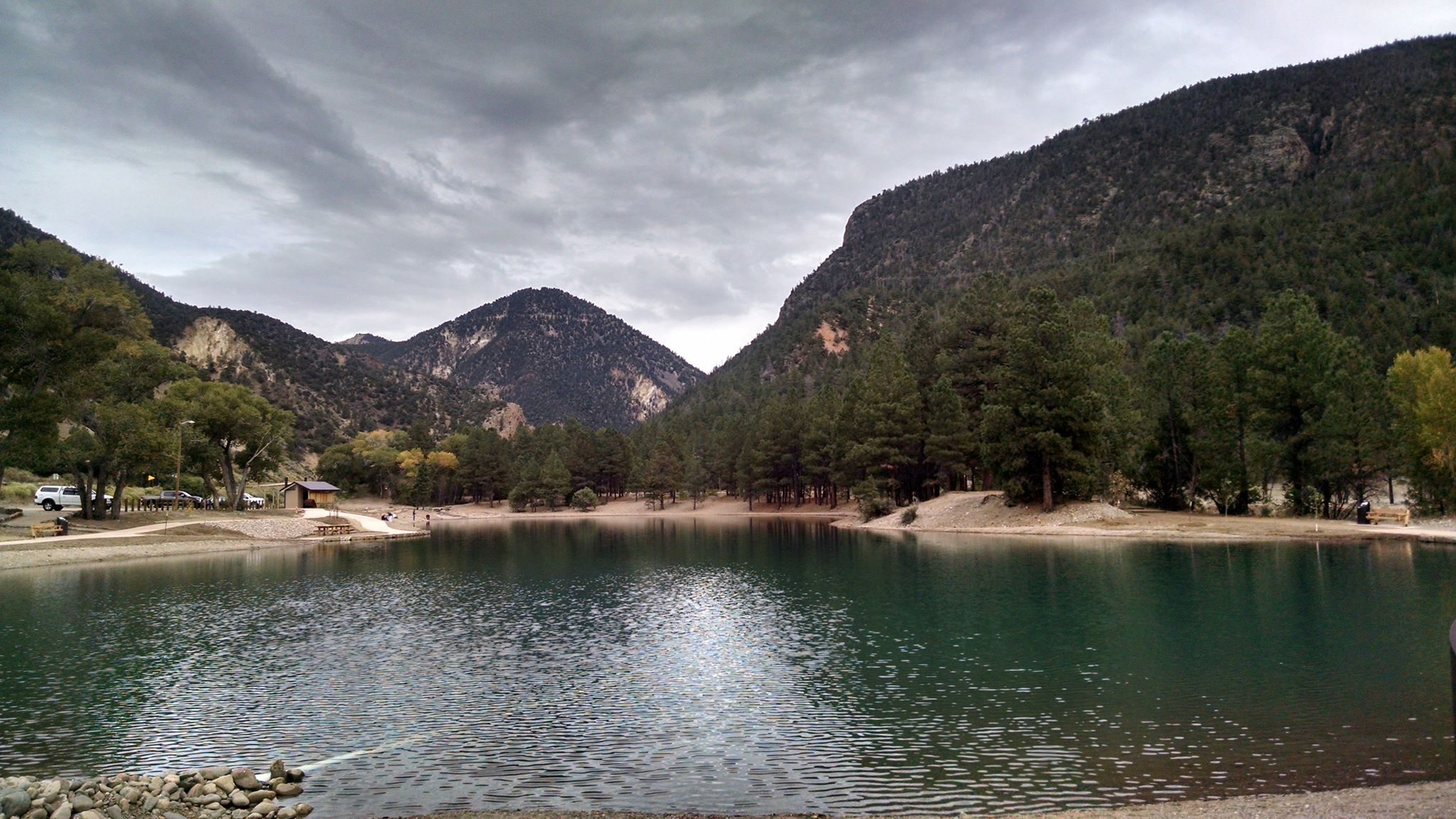
Eagle Rock Lake, Questa, NM

Surrounding Questa are the Rio Grande del Norte National Monument and the Carson National Forest. Outside Questa's Village limits is Eagle Rock Lake. The Red River is currently undergoing restoration to improve trout habitat, with the section parallel to Eagle Rock Lake complete. Cabresto Lake features hiking trails to mountaintop lakes in the Latir Peaks Wilderness. In the Rio Grande del Norte National Monument are two popular locations: the La Junta Overlook, where the Rio Grande and the Red River come together over 800 feet below, and the Big Arsenic Trail containing petroglyphs and a natural spring.

== Demographics ==
Historical population
Census	Pop.	Note	%±
1970	1,095		—
1980	1,202		9.8%
1990	1,707		42.0%
2000	1,864		9.2%
2010	1,770		−5.0%
2020	1,742		−1.6%
U.S. Decennial Census

As of the census of 2000, there were 1,767 people, 741 households, and 512 families residing in the village. The population density was 365.0 inhabitants per square mile (140.9/km^{2}). There were 888 housing units at an average density of 173.9 units per square mile (67.1 units/km^{2}). The racial makeup of the village was 50.16% White, 0.11% African American, 0.70% Native American, 0.05% Asian, 0.11% Pacific Islander, 43.40% from other races, and 5.47% from two or more races. Hispanic or Latino of any race were 80.53% of the population.

There were 741 households, out of which 35.6% had children under the age of 18 living with them, 49.3% were married couples living together, 13.8% had a female householder with no husband present, and 30.8% were non-families. 26.5% of all households were made up of individuals, and 9.9% had someone living alone who was 65 years of age or older. The average household size was 2.52 and the average family size was 3.02.

In the village, the population was spread out, with 28.0% under the age of 18, 7.4% from 18 to 24, 26.3% from 25 to 44, 25.4% from 45 to 64, and 12.9% who were 65 years of age or older. The median age was 38 years. For every 100 females, there were 95.4 males. For every 100 females age 18 and over, there were 95.3 males.

The median income for a household in the village was $23,448, and the median income for a family was $30,000. Males had a median income of $26,667 versus $20,000 for females. The per capita income for the village was $13,303. About 20.7% of families and 24.3% of the population were below the poverty line, including 29.8% of those under age 18 and 20.4% of those age 65 or over.

== Economy ==
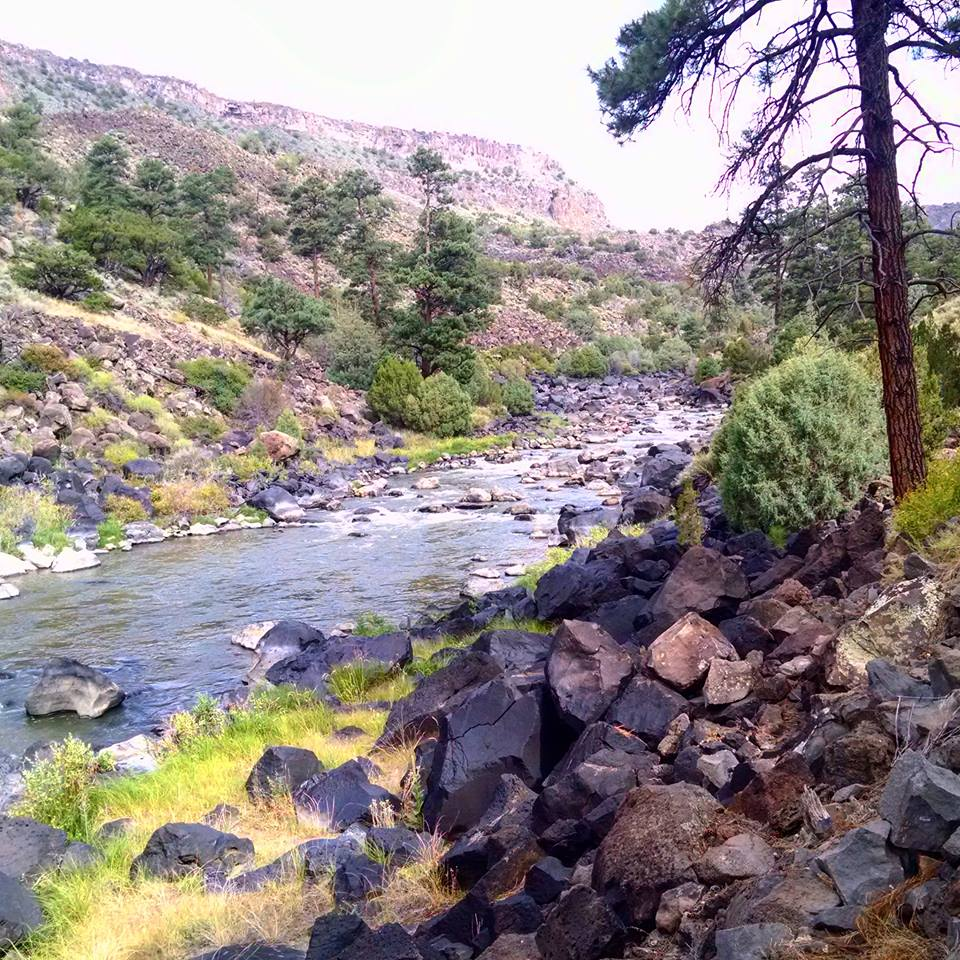
The Rio Grande in the Rio Grande del Norte National Monument

The Chevron Questa molybdenum mine, nine miles (14 km) from Questa, was the largest private employer in Taos County. The mine opened in 1916 as the R&S Molybdenum mine. It was purchased by Molycorp Minerals in 1950 and became a subsidiary of Chevron in 2005. Formerly an open pit excavation, the Chevron Questa mine operated as an underground mine from 1982. Economic conditions that affect the mine resulted in a 54 percent cut in personnel in February 2009, which primarily impacted the residents of Questa. On June 2, 2014, Chevron Mining announced the immediate and permanent closure of the mine due to continuing low molybdenum prices and high operating costs. The mine was employing about 300 people at the time of the shutdown. The mine employs about 150 people on work related to reclamation and remediation, either directly or through its contractors.

Agriculture, especially the cultivation of alfalfa, hay, and winter wheat, has experienced renewed interest along with the expansion of agriculture to historic crops and crops of high value. Agriculture in Questa is strongly dependent on irrigation, supplied from the Red River and Cabresto Creek. The system of ditches or acequias that supplies water to the fields is of great community and social importance; the burning of the ditches on the first weekend after the vernal equinox is a major community event. Two major 'ditch associations' control the distribution of water by controlling the outflow from the Cabresto Lake dam: the Acequia Madre and the Llano ditch.

Historically, sheep were raised in and around Questa, but they have been replaced by cattle. Cattle are grazed on the plains north and west of town during the winter and spring, then moved west to the other side of the Rio Grande in early June, usually driven across the "Sheep Crossing" ford by riders on horseback.

Increasingly, the traditional economy based on agriculture, livestock, handicrafts (particularly wooden religious carvings known as santos), wood gathering, and honey is failing to meet the financial needs of the populace of Questa. Some locals blame the rising cost on the influx of celebrities and affluent Anglos to the Taos area driving up land and home prices, but for whatever cause an increasing number of Questeños commute to work in Red River, Taos, and Angel Fire.

Questa has developed as a tourist destination. With the Historic San Antonio del Rio Colorado Church, Rio Grande del Norte National Monument, Eagle Rock Lake, and the Carson National Forest several avenues for tourism based economic opportunities have taken shape and continue to grow based on the previous and to be expanded tourist activities.

== Education ==
Questa Independent School System is the local school district. It operates two schools: Alta Vista Elementary & Intermediate School, and Questa Junior & Senior High School.

Roots and Wings Community school, an Expeditionary Learning School, is near Questa in the Lama area.

== Government ==
Questa is a municipal government founded in 1842. The Village of Questa is governed by a mayor, currently John Ortega, and a four-member Village Council who have 4-year staggered terms.

== Infrastructure and transportation ==
=== Major highways ===
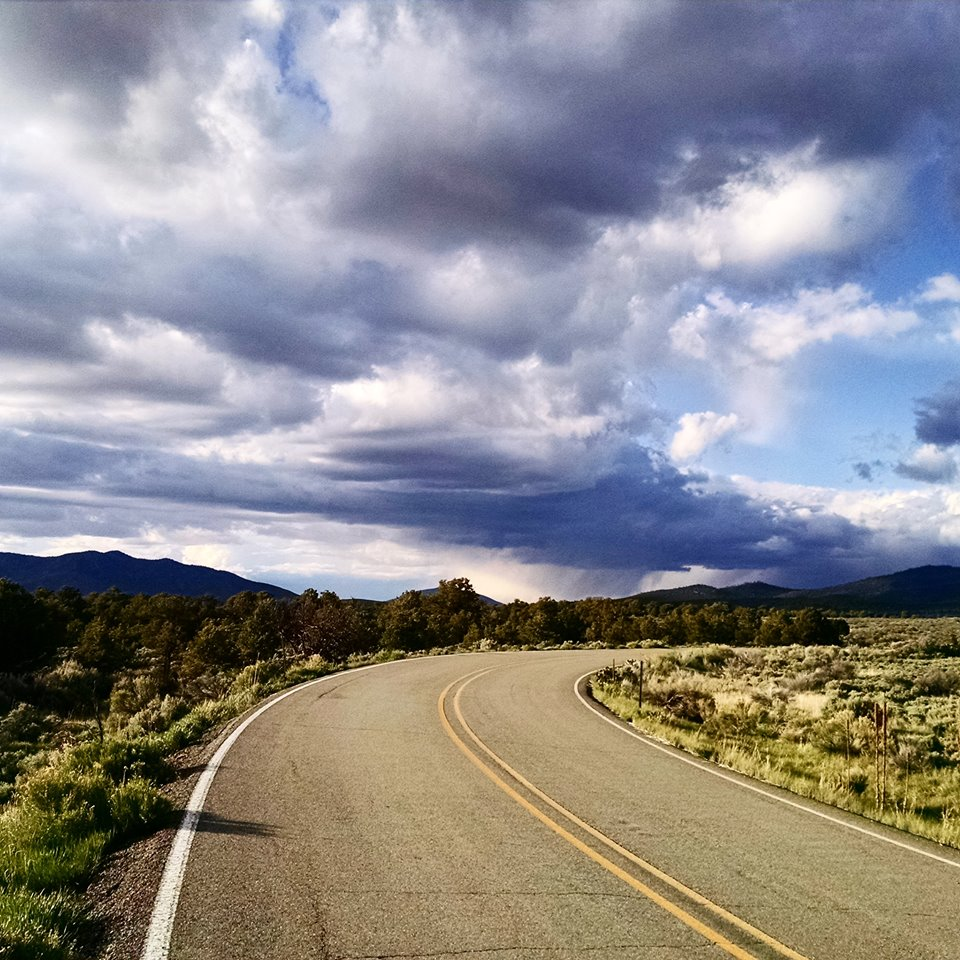
Road in the Rio Grande del Norte National Monument

Questa's village center has the two major New Mexico State Highways: 522 and 38. State Highway 522 heads south to Taos and north to the Colorado border. State Highway 38 connects Questa to Red River and Eagle Nest as part of the Enchanted Circle.

=== Transportation ===
Questa is serviced by the North Central RTD's Blue Bus service which provides free service to Red River and Taos during commuting hours. For air travel the Questa Municipal Airport Nr 2, owned by the Village of Questa, is available.

=== Utilities ===
The Water/Sewer Department of the Village of Questa operates water and sewer for the Questa Area. Kit Carson Electric Cooperative, Inc. supplies electricity and is in the process of implementing a fiber optic project in Taos County.

=== Healthcare ===
Presbyterian Medical Services' Questa Health Clinic provides medical, dental, and behavioral health care for Questa and the surrounding area. The Holy Cross Hospital in Taos is the nearest hospital to Questa at roughly 30 miles (48 km) from the Village.

== See also ==
- List of municipalities in New Mexico
- Auguste Lacome
- Carson National Forest
- Rio Grande del Norte National Monument
- Wild Rivers Recreation Area
