= Red River (New Mexico) =

River in New Mexico, United States

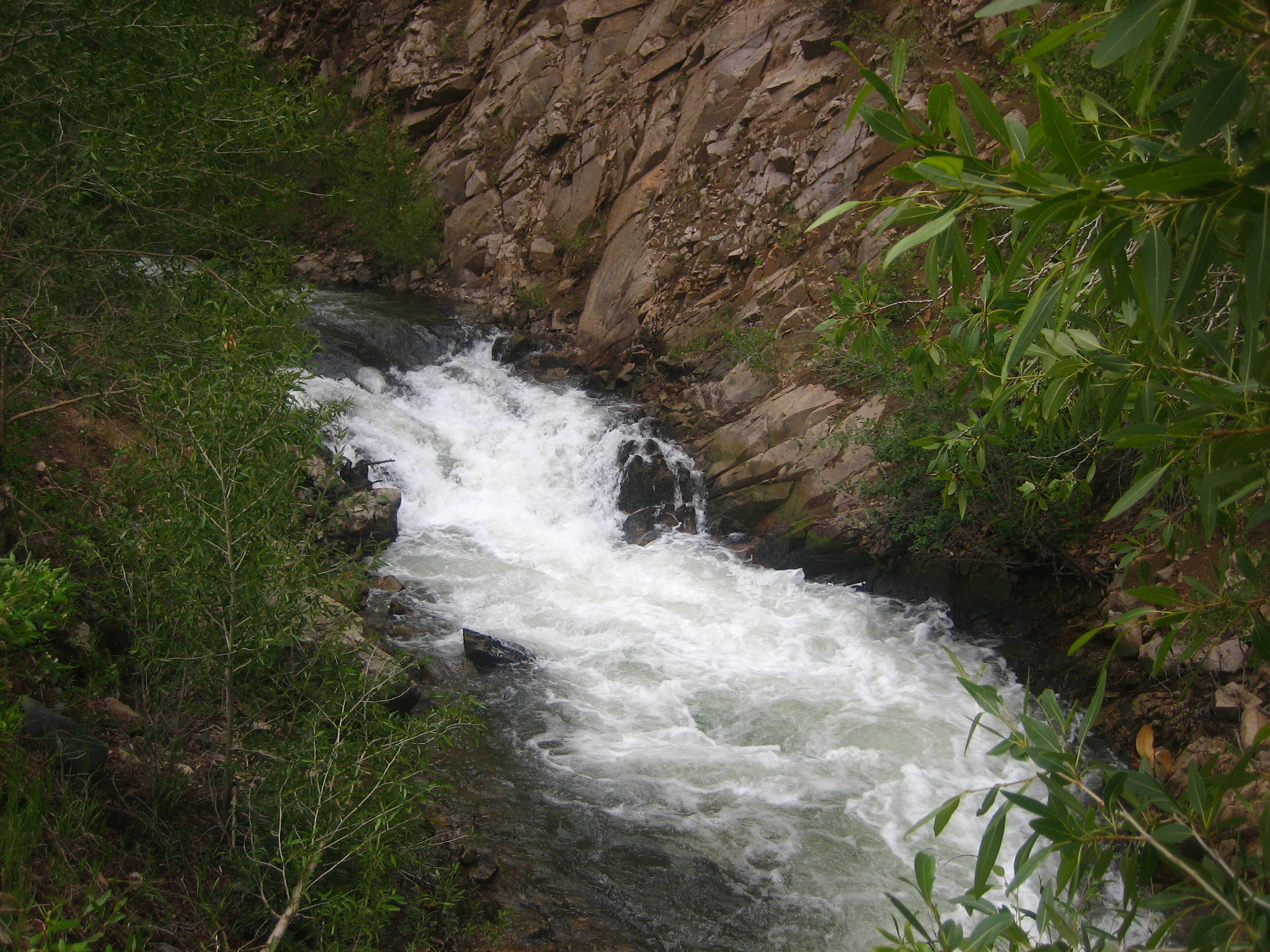
- The Red River of New Mexico

- Location of the Red River in New Mexico and the United States Red River (New Mexico) (the United States)
- Native name: Təsiwp’ó’ona (Northern Tiwa)

Location
- Country: United States
- State: New Mexico

Physical characteristics
- Source: Mount Wheeler
  - location: Taos County
  - coordinates: 36°37′16″N 105°23′41″W
  - elevation: 13,161 ft (4,011 m)
- Mouth: Rio Grande
  - location: Taos County
  - coordinates: 36°38′52″N 105°41′36″W
  - elevation: 6,578 ft (2,005 m)
- Basin size: 187 sq mi (480 km^{2})

National Wild and Scenic River

The Red River (Northern Tiwa: Təsiwp’ó’ona) of New Mexico, United States, is a short, perennial river that flows down the north slope of Mount Wheeler in the Sangre de Cristo Mountains, flows west past the towns of Red River and Questa and then south into the Rio Grande just south of the La Junta Campground.

The Red River is noted for its trout fishery and its lower portion is part of the Wild Rivers Recreation Area. Located below Questa on the river is the New Mexico Red River Fish Hatchery.

The Red River derives its water from snowmelt and summer season convective storms and due to the relatively consistent patterns of orographic precipitation it is a perennial stream.

== See also ==
- Red River Canyon affair – a battle in the Taos Revolt, part of the Mexican–American War
- List of rivers of New Mexico
- List of tributaries of the Rio Grande
- Wild Rivers Recreation Area
