= Taos Plateau volcanic field =

Volcanic field in New Mexico and Colorado

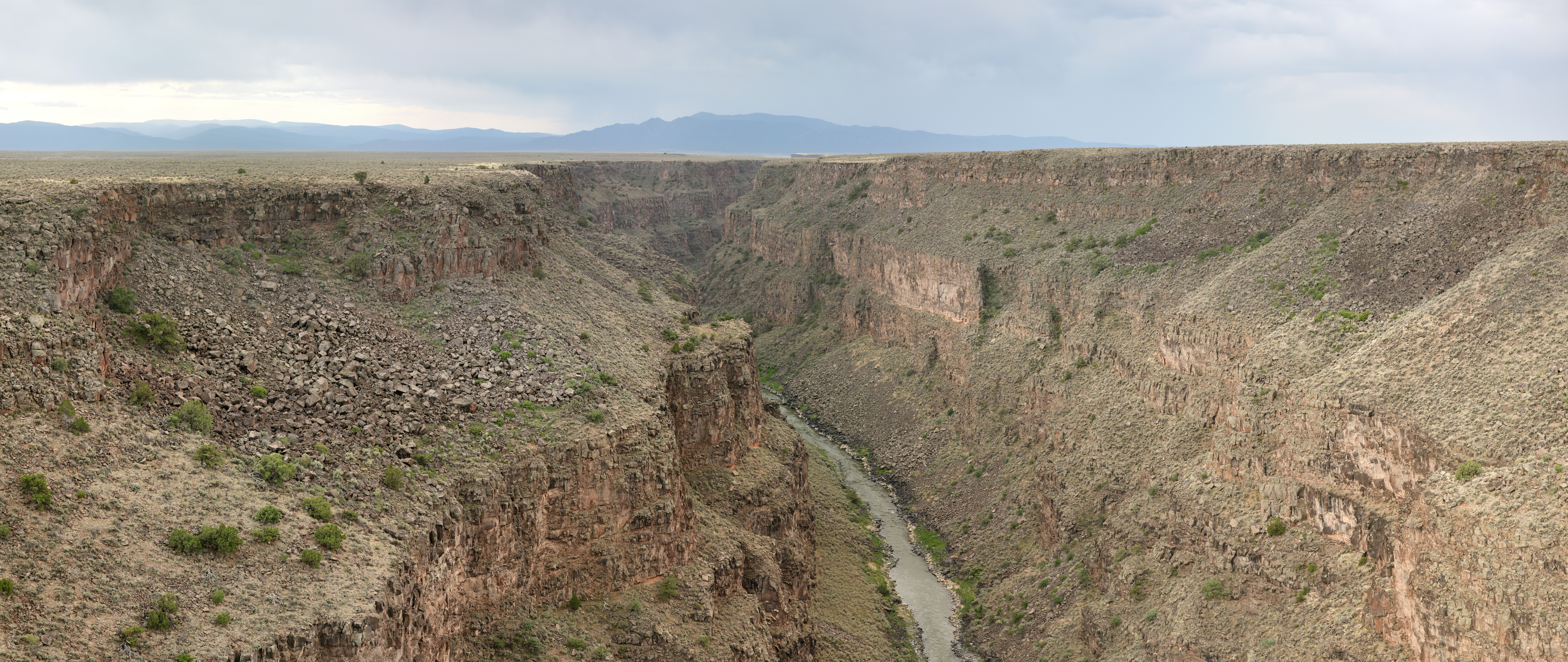
Rio Grande Gorge

The Taos Plateau volcanic field is an area of extensive volcanism in Taos County, New Mexico, United States. It is the largest volcanic field in the Rio Grande Rift, spreading over 7,000 square kilometers (2,700 sq mi). The total erupted volume is estimated at 420 cubic kilometers (100 cu mi). The age of most of the vents and associated lava flows in the field is estimated to be between 1.8 and 4 million years, with a few 22-million-year-old vents. The composition of the lavas varies from tholeiitic basalt to rhyolite. Landforms include sheet flows, cinder cones, and shield volcanoes. The sheet flows of the Servilleta Basalt are well-exposed in the Rio Grande Gorge carved by the Rio Grande. The highest point of the field is San Antonio Mountain at 10,908 feet (3,325 m).

== Notable vents ==
The field contains at least 35 vents, arranged in a rough concentric pattern 50 kilometers (31 mi) across. The central part of the field is the most mafic, consisting of tholeiitic basalt shield volcanoes, with andesite vents further out and rhyodacite vents in the outer part of the field. Two small rhyolite domes in the center of the field are exceptions to this pattern.

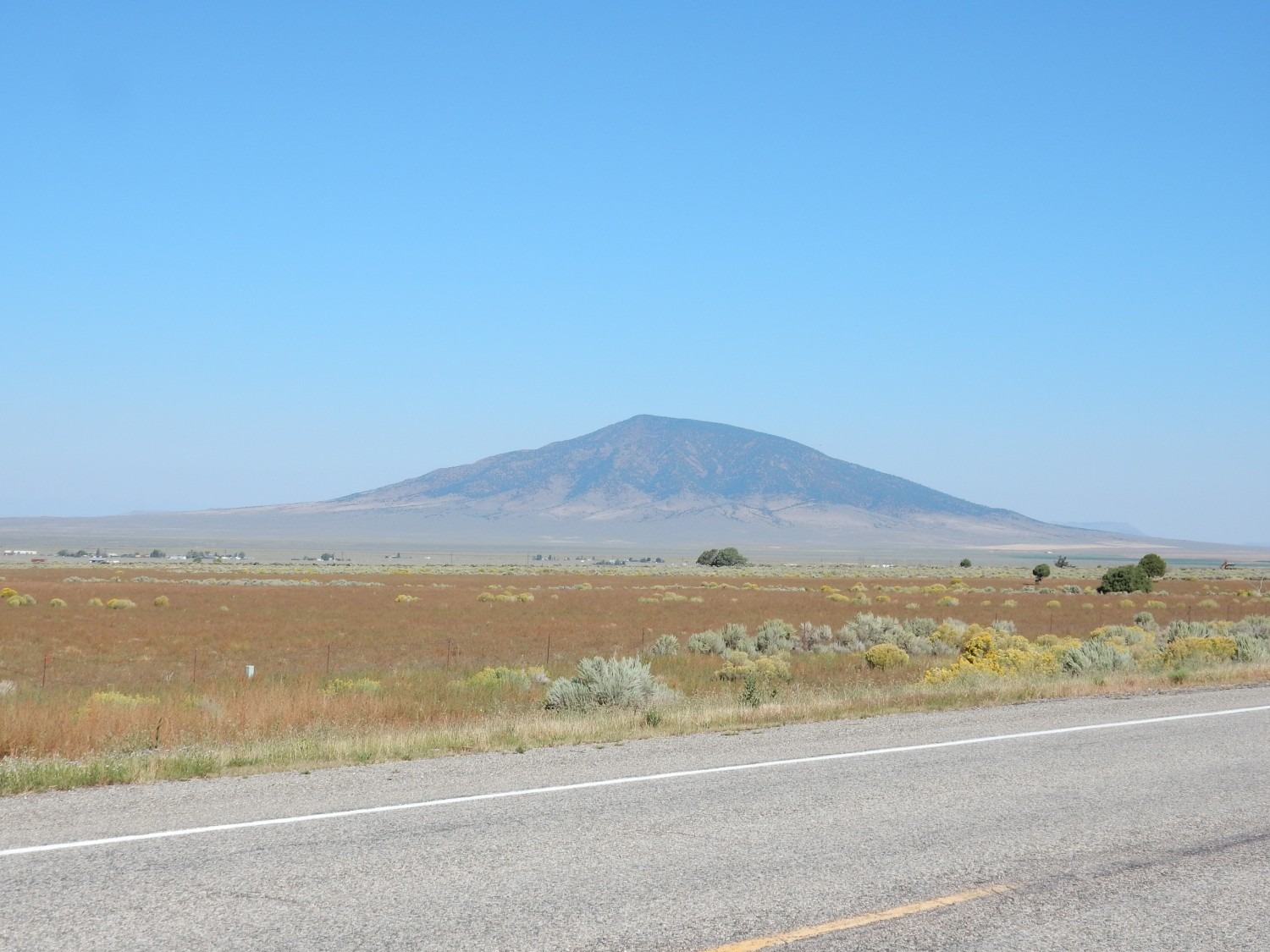
Ute Mountain

Name	Elevation		Location	Last eruption
Name	meters	feet	Coordinates	Last eruption
San Antonio Mountain	3,325	10,908	36°51′34″N 106°01′7.3″W	-
Ute Mountain	3,076	10,093	36°56′14″N 105°41′02″W	-
Cerro de la Ollaute mountain	2,887	9,475	36°45′21″N 105°47′55″W	-
Cerro del Aire	2,750	9,023	36°43′08″N 105°55′03″W	-
Cerro Chiflo	2,736	8,978	36°44′54″N 105°42′35″W	-
Guadalupe Mountain North	2,688	8,820	36°44′27″N 105°37′36″W	-
Guadalupe Mountain South	2,658	8,722	36°43′00″N 105°38′56″W	-
Cerro Montoso	2,638	8,655	36°40′24″N 105°46′04″W	-

== Origin ==
The field lies near the intersection of the Jemez Lineament with the Rio Grande rift. Here hot mantle rock has bulged upwards into the rift, allowing a high degree of decompressional melting to produce the tholeiitic magmas. The outer zone of andesites and rhyodacites is interpreted as a lower degree of melting, while the two rhyolite domes are interpreted as resulting from fractional crystallization of magma in the shallow crust.

== Economic resources ==
Perlite is mined from the rhyolite flows and domes at No Agua. The production here has contributed to making New Mexico the leading producer of perlite in the United States.

One important mine is No Agua, opened in 1951.

== See also ==
- List of volcanic fields
