= Vallecito Mountain =

Mountain in New Mexico, United States

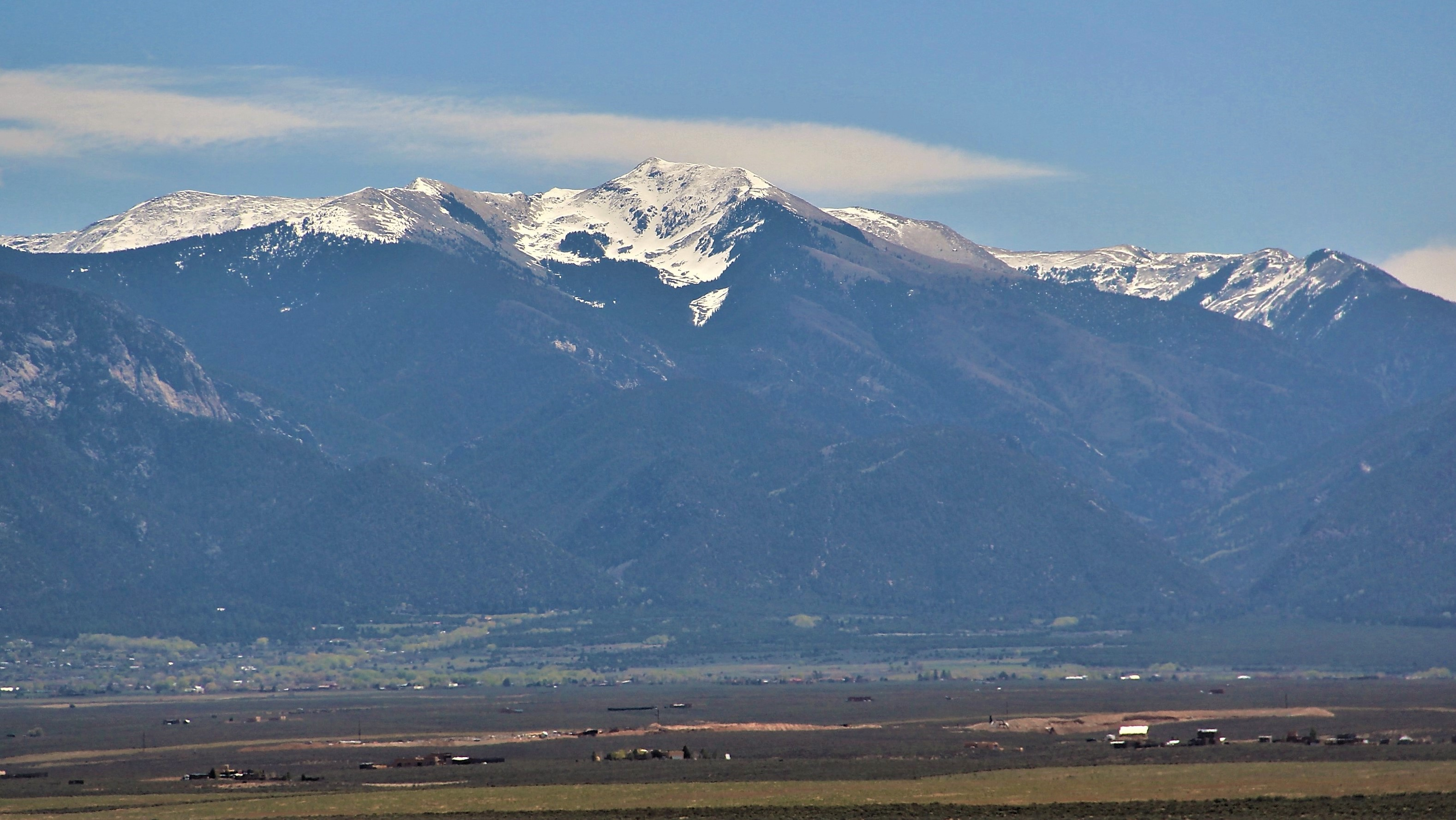
- West aspect

Highest point
- Elevation: 12,643 ft (3,854 m)
- Prominence: 794 ft (242 m)
- Parent peak: Lake Fork Peak
- Isolation: 1.46 mi (2.35 km)
- Coordinates: 36°32′03″N 105°27′44″W

Geography
- Location within New Mexico Location within the United States
- Country: United States
- State: New Mexico
- County: Taos
- Protected area: Wheeler Peak Wilderness
- Parent range: Taos Mountains; Sangre de Cristo Mountains; Rocky Mountains
- Topo map: USGS Wheeler Peak

Climbing
- Easiest route: class 2 hiking

Vallecito Mountain is a 12,643-foot elevation (3,854 m) summit in Taos County, New Mexico, United States.

== Description ==
Vallecito Mountain is part of the Taos Mountains which are a subset of the Sangre de Cristo Mountains and it ranks as the 14th-highest summit in New Mexico. The mountain is located 12 miles northeast of the town of Taos and three miles west-southwest of Wheeler Peak, the highest point in the state. The mountain is set on the boundary of the Wheeler Peak Wilderness and the Carson National Forest. Precipitation runoff from the mountain drains into tributaries of the Rio Grande. Topographic relief is significant as the summit rises over 3,400 feet (1,000 meters) above Lucero Canyon in 1.7 mile (2.7 km). This mountain's toponym has been officially adopted by the United States Board on Geographic Names, and the Spanish name "Vallecito" means "little valley."

== Climate ==
According to the Köppen climate classification system, Vallecito Mountain has an alpine climate with cold, snowy winters, and cool to warm summers. Due to its altitude, it receives precipitation all year, as snow in winter and as thunderstorms in summer. Climbers can expect afternoon rain, hail, and lightning from the seasonal monsoon in late July and August.

== Gallery ==
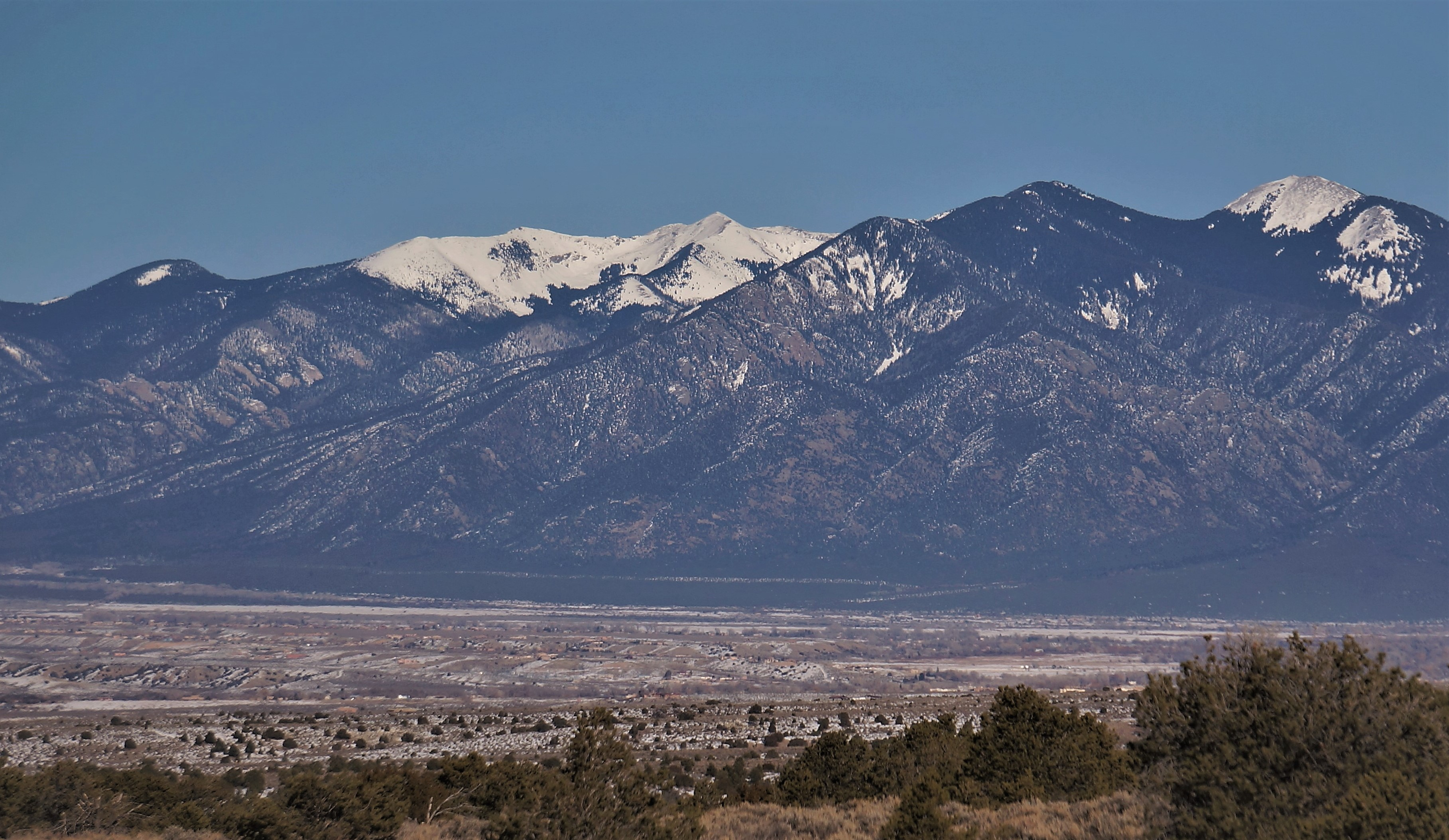
Southwest aspect of Vallecito Mountain centered on the skyline.
(Pueblo Peak in the upper right corner)

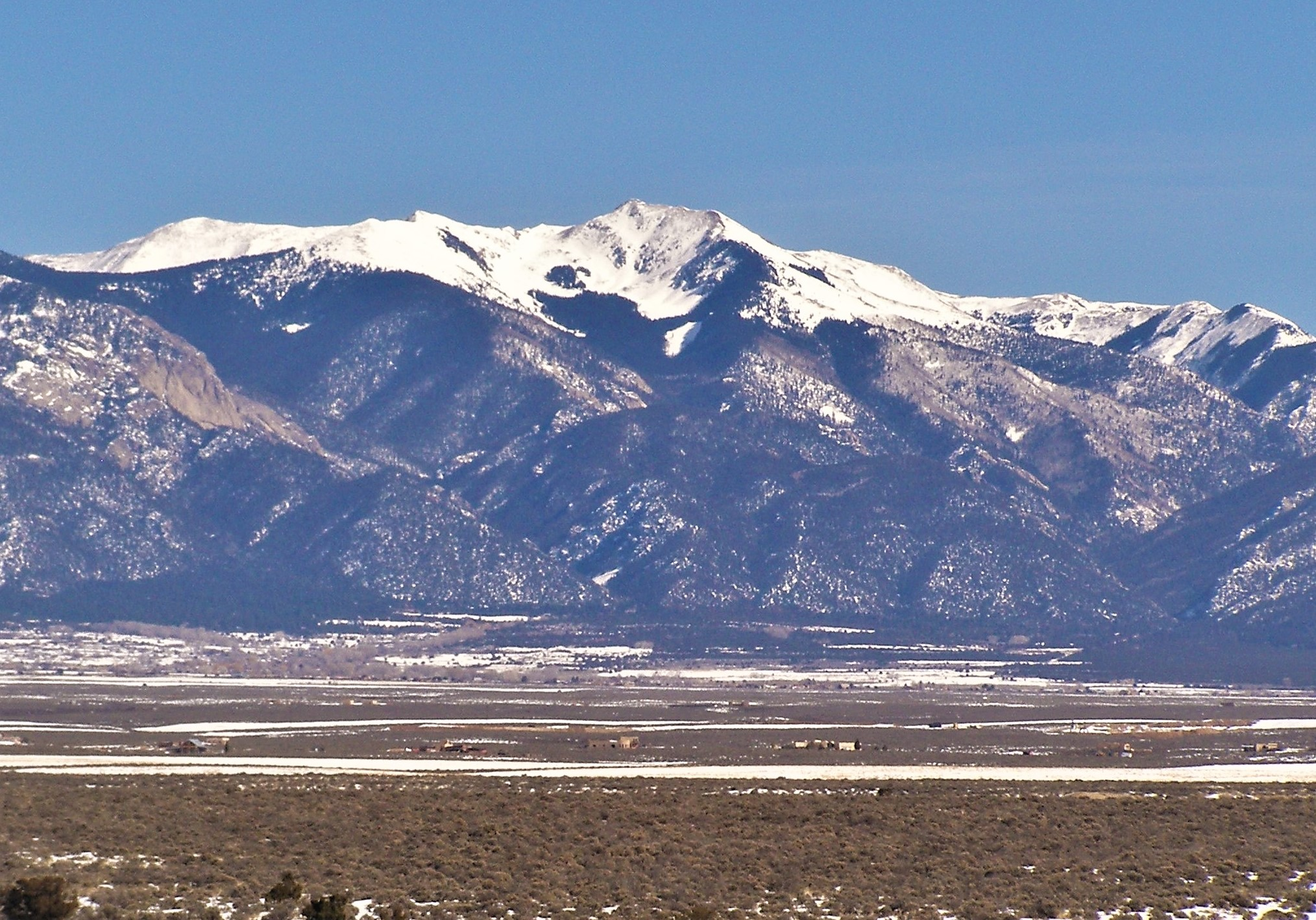
Vallecito Mountain (center) and Lake Fork Peak (left)

== See also ==
- List of mountain peaks of New Mexico
