= Columbine–Hondo Wilderness =

Wilderness area in New Mexico, United States

Coordinates: 36°38′37″N 105°27′22″W

- IUCN category Ib (wilderness area)
- Location: Taos County, New Mexico, United States
- Area: 44,698 acres (18,089 ha)
- Established: 2014-12-19
- Governing body: U.S. Forest Service

Columbine–Hondo Wilderness is a 44,698-acre (18,089 ha) Wilderness area located within the Carson National Forest in New Mexico. The area was added to the National Wilderness Preservation System on December 19, 2014, by Public Law 113-291. Located in the Sangre de Cristo Mountains, this area contains the headwaters to the Rio Hondo and Red River as well as three peaks which rise to or above timberline.

Elevations in the wilderness range from 7,861 feet (2,396 m) to 12,710 feet (3,870 m) at Gold Hill. The other principal summits of the wilderness area are Lobo Peak (12,113 feet (3,692 m)) and Flag Mountain (11,946 feet (3,641 m)). The Colombine–Hondo Wilderness is separated from the Wheeler Peak Wilderness to the south only by Highway 150 and the Taos Ski Valley. The Latir Peak Wilderness is located north of Colombine-Hondo Wilderness.

The wilderness has vegetation typical of the southern Rocky Mountains with Ponderosa Pine and Pinyon forests at lower elevations, mixed conifers and aspens at the middle elevations, spruce-fir forests at higher elevations, and alpine tundra above treeline which is about 12,000 ft (3,700 m) in elevation.

== History ==
Columbine–Hondo was designated a wilderness study area by congress in 1980. In April 2012, Senator Jeff Bingaman unsuccessfully introduced a bill (S.2468) to designate the area as wilderness. The bill (S.776) was re-introduced by Senators Martin Heinrich and Tom Udall in April 2013 followed by an identical house bill (H.R.1683) introduced by Representative Ben Ray Luján. The bill was signed into law on December 19, 2014.
