= Baldy Mountain (Taos County, New Mexico) =

Peak of the Sangre de Cristo Mountains of New Mexico

- Location within New Mexico

Highest point
- Elevation: 12,053 ft (3,674 m) NAVD 88
- Prominence: 208 ft (63 m)
- Coordinates: 36°47′08″N 105°26′24″W

Geography
- Location: Taos County, New Mexico, U.S.
- Parent range: Sangre de Cristo Mountains
- Topo map: USGS Latir Peak

Baldy Mountain is a peak of the Sangre de Cristo Mountains of New Mexico. It is in the Latir Peak Wilderness, 3 miles (4.8 km) east of Latir Peak.

== See also ==
- Carson National Forest
