= Gold Hill (New Mexico) =

Mountain in New Mexico, United States

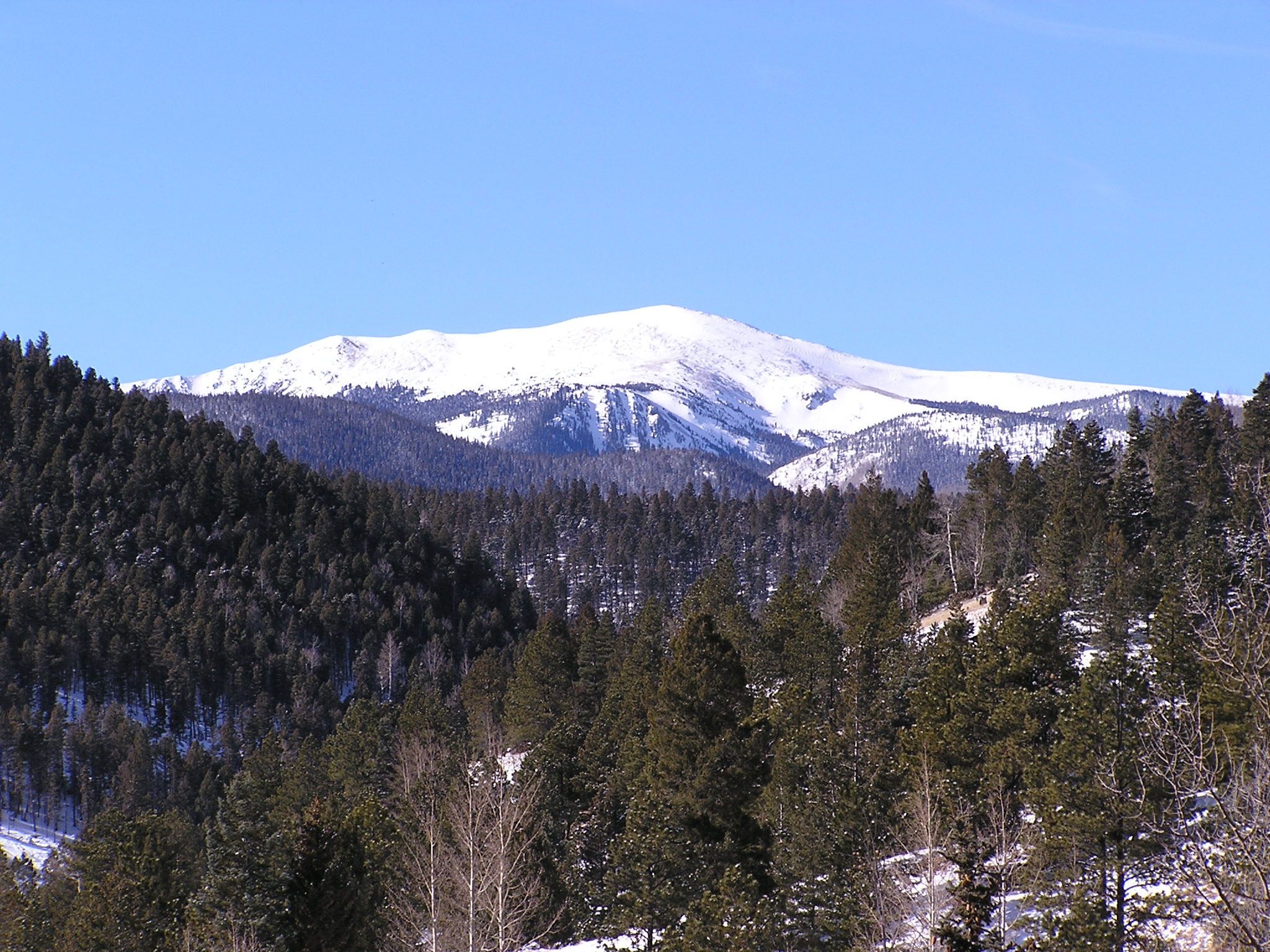
- East aspect

Highest point
- Elevation: 12,716 ft (3,876 m)
- Prominence: 1,811 ft (552 m)
- Parent peak: Wheeler Peak
- Isolation: 6.34 mi (10.20 km)
- Listing: Mountains of New Mexico; Highest major summits of the US
- Coordinates: 36°38′35″N 105°27′21″W

Geography
- Location within New Mexico Location within the United States
- Country: United States of America
- State: New Mexico
- County: Taos
- Protected area: Columbine–Hondo Wilderness
- Parent range: Taos Mountains; Sangre de Cristo Mountains; Rocky Mountains
- Topo map: USGS Red River

Climbing
- Easiest route: class 1 hiking trail

Gold Hill is a 12,716-foot elevation (3,876 m) mountain summit in Taos County, New Mexico, United States.

== Description ==
Gold Hill is part of the Taos Mountains which are a subset of the Sangre de Cristo Mountains. It is the highest point in the Columbine–Hondo Wilderness and ranks as the 11th-highest summit in New Mexico. The mountain is located within the Carson National Forest, 18.5 miles north-northeast of the town of Taos and 6.5 miles north-northwest of Wheeler Peak, the highest point in the state. Precipitation runoff from the mountain drains to Red River and Rio Hondo which are tributaries the Rio Grande. Topographic relief is significant as the west aspect rises 1,700 feet (520 meters) in 0.75 mile (1.2 km). An ascent of the peak involves 3,261 feet of elevation gain over 10.6 miles (round-trip) of hiking the Gold Hill Trail which crosses over the summit. This mountain's toponym has been officially adopted by the United States Board on Geographic Names, and the name refers to gold mining that took place here in the late 1800s.

== Climate ==
According to the Köppen climate classification system, Gold Hill has an alpine climate with cold, snowy winters, and cool to warm summers. Due to its altitude, it receives precipitation all year, as snow in winter and as thunderstorms in summer. Climbers can expect afternoon rain, hail, and lightning from the seasonal monsoon in late July and August. This climate supports the Taos Ski Valley area immediately south of Gold Hill.

== Gallery ==
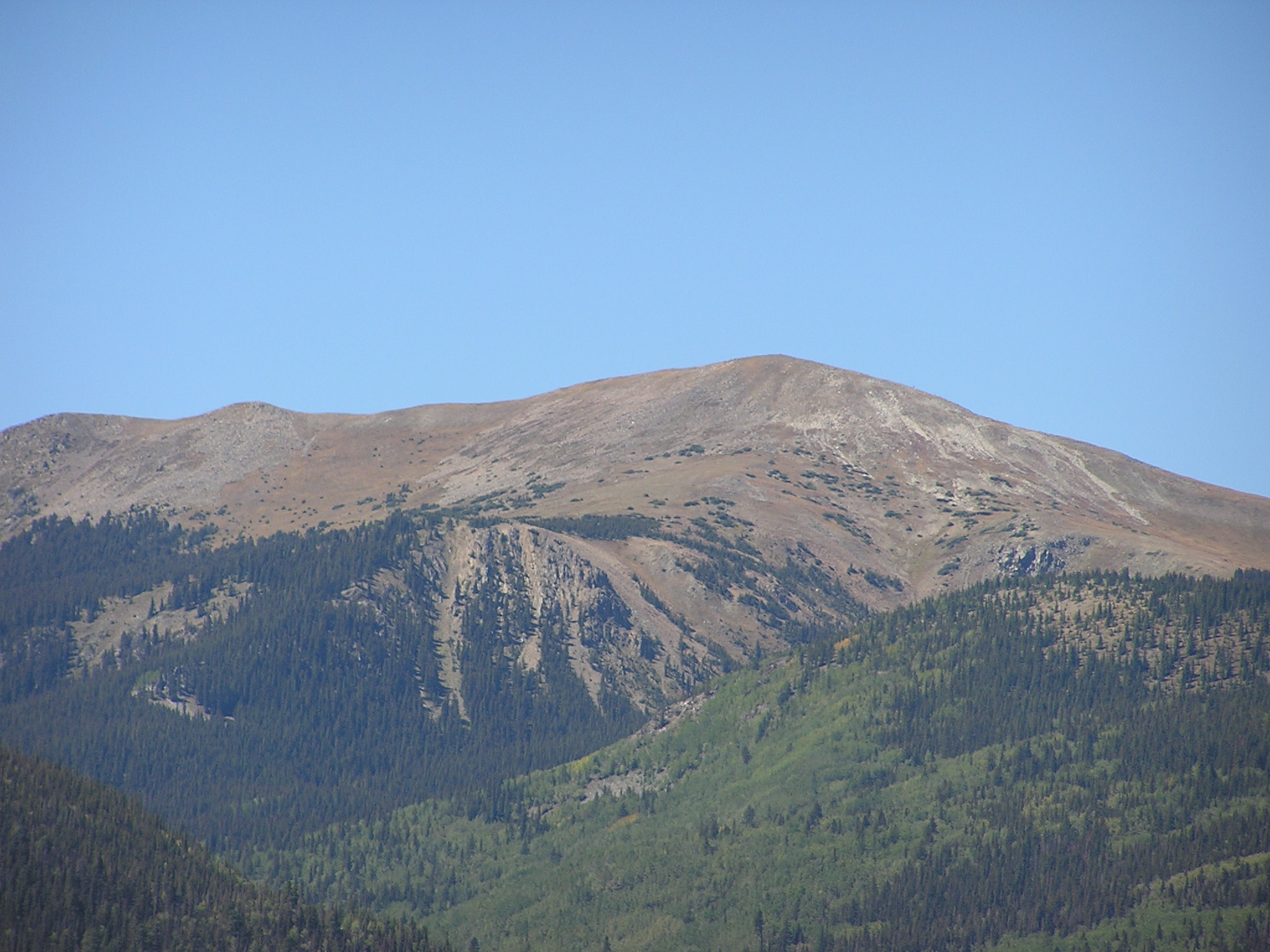
East aspect

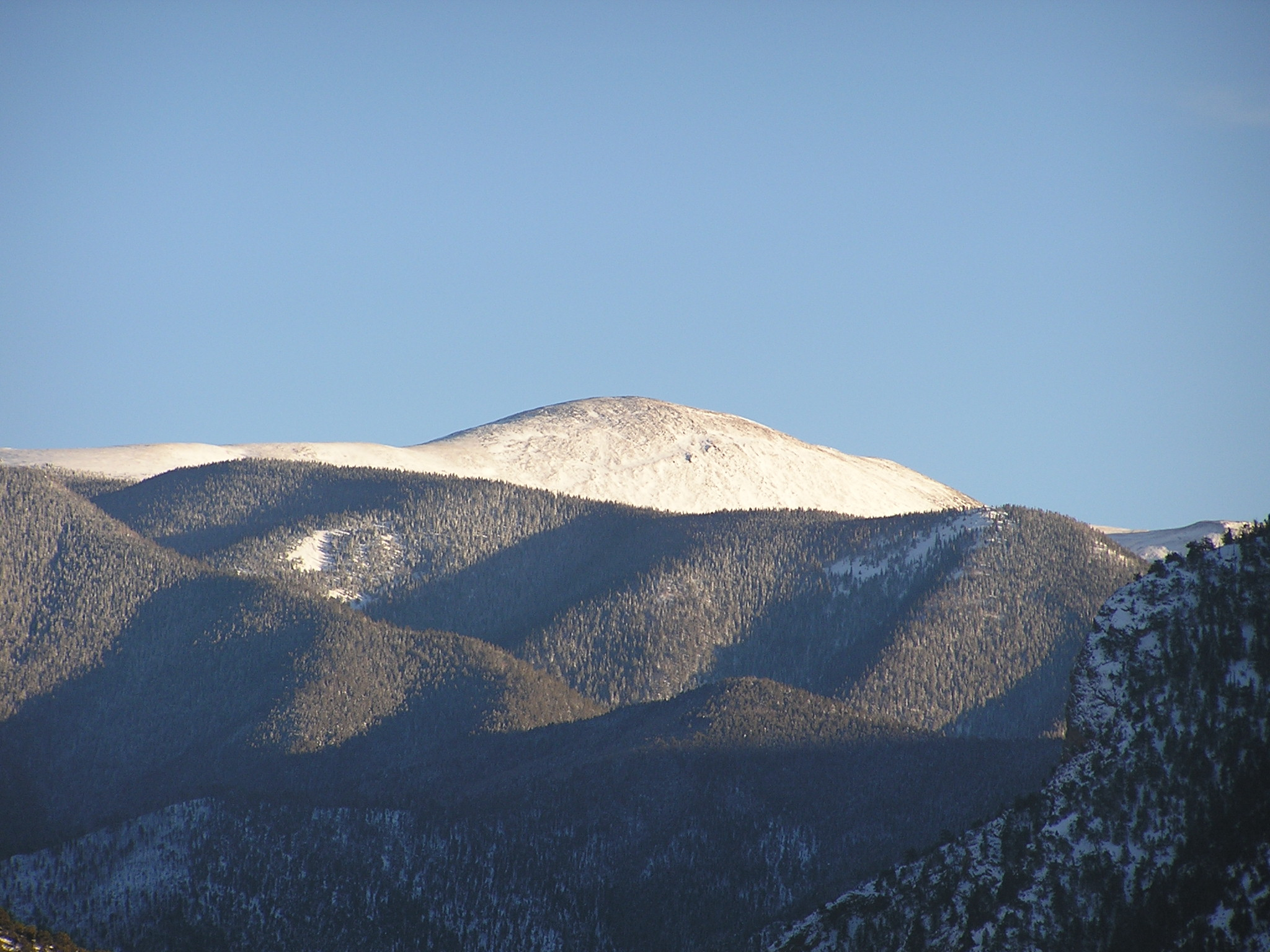
Northwest aspect

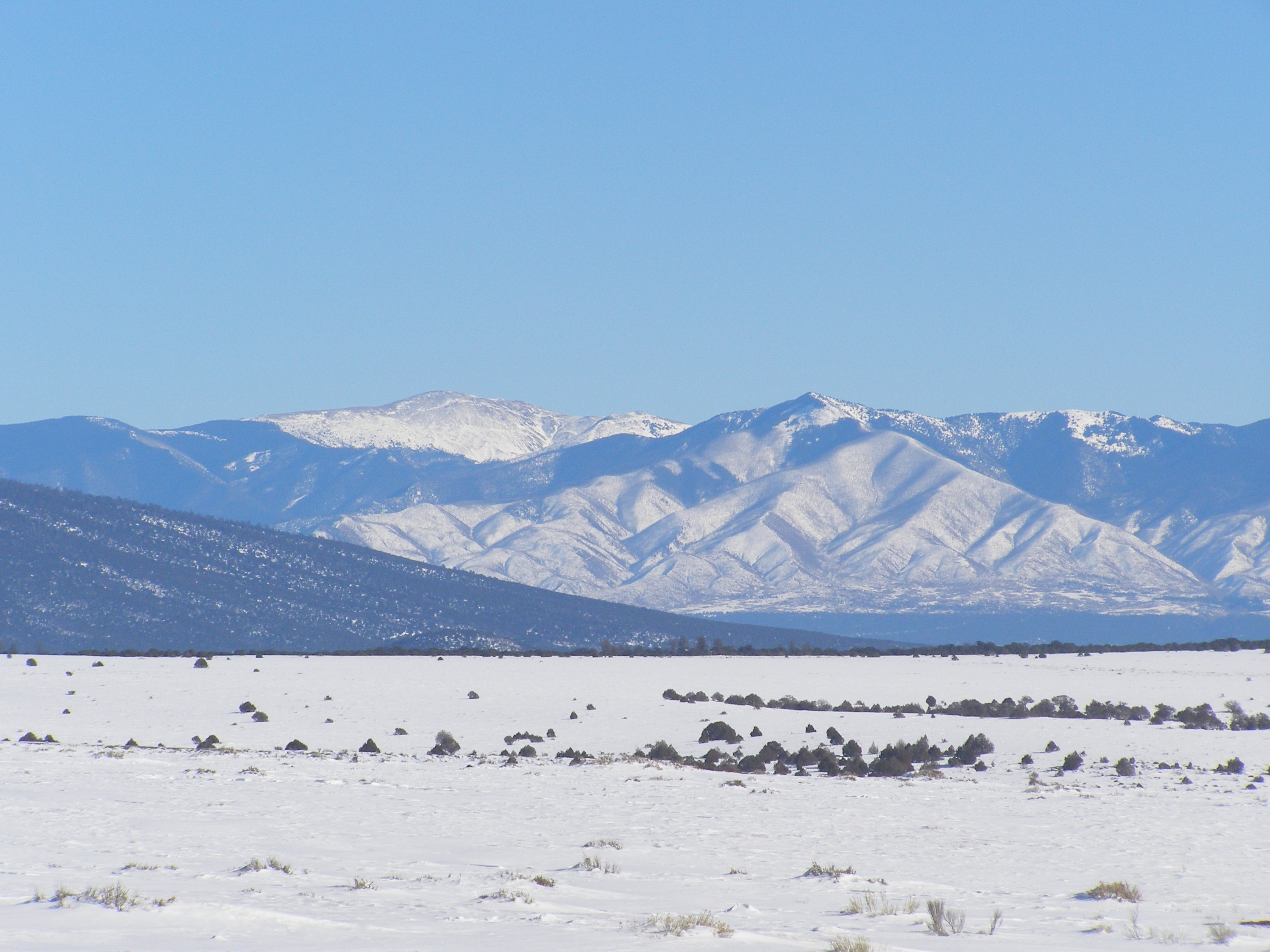
Gold Hill (left) and Flag Mountain (right) from the northwest

== See also ==
- List of mountain peaks of New Mexico
