= Mount Walter (New Mexico) =

Mountain in New Mexico, U.S.

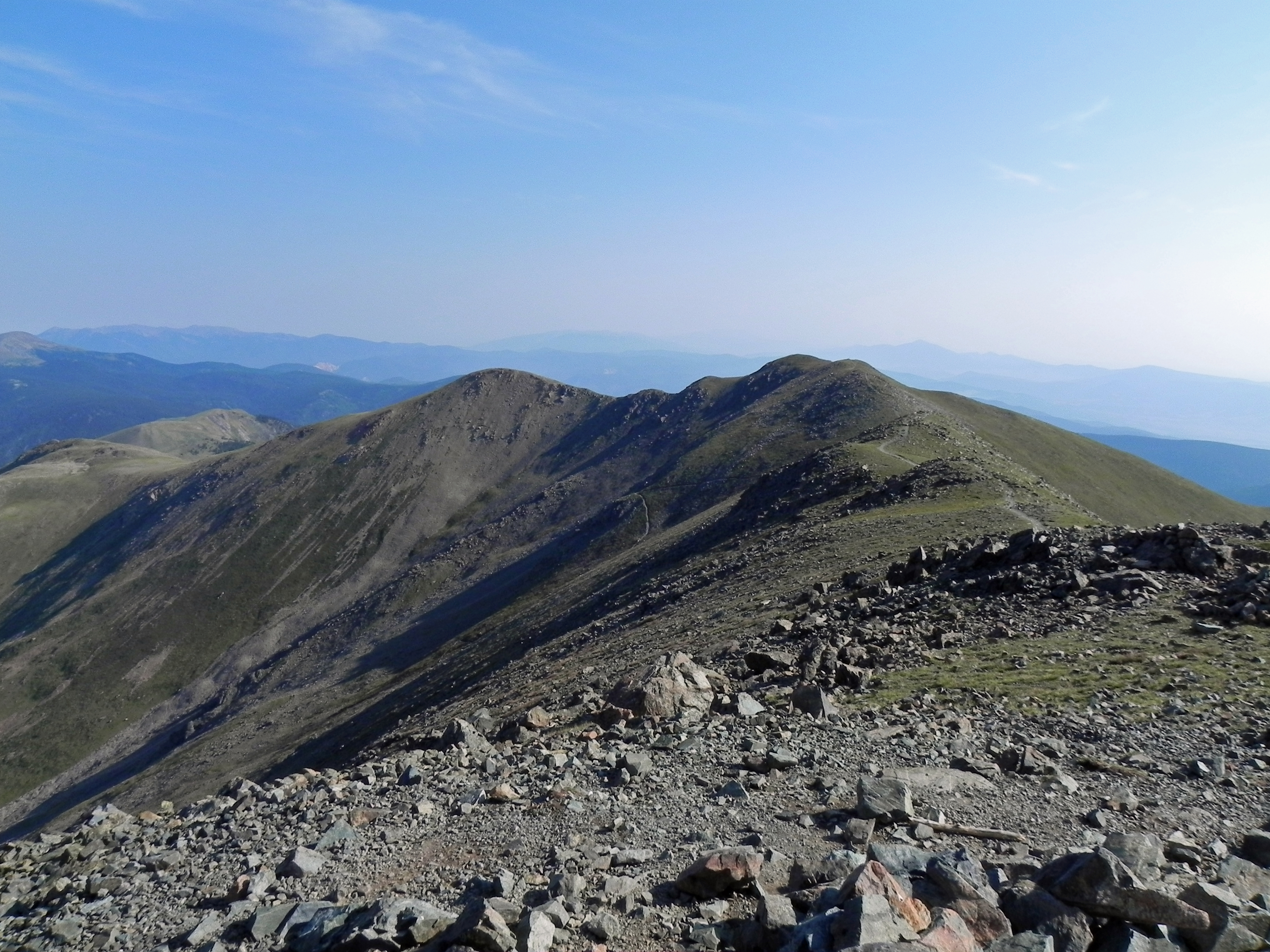
- Mount Walter from Wheeler Peak

Highest point
- Elevation: 13,141 ft (4,005 m) NAVD 88
- Prominence: 53 ft (16 m)
- Parent peak: Wheeler Peak
- Coordinates: 36°33′44″N 105°24′52″W

Geography
- Location within New Mexico
- Location: Taos County, New Mexico, U.S.
- Parent range: Sangre de Cristo Mountains
- Topo map: USGS Wheeler Peak

Climbing
- Easiest route: Bull-of-the-Woods Trail

Mount Walter is the second highest named summit in the U.S. state of New Mexico, rising to 13,141 feet above sea level. However it is not usually counted as an independent mountain since it has only about 53 feet (16 m) of topographic prominence, and is only 0.4 miles (0.6 km) north-northeast of Wheeler Peak, the highest peak in New Mexico. Both peaks lie in the Taos Mountains, a subrange of the Sangre de Cristo Mountains, which is in turn a subrange of the Rocky Mountains. They are also in the Wheeler Peak Wilderness of Carson National Forest.

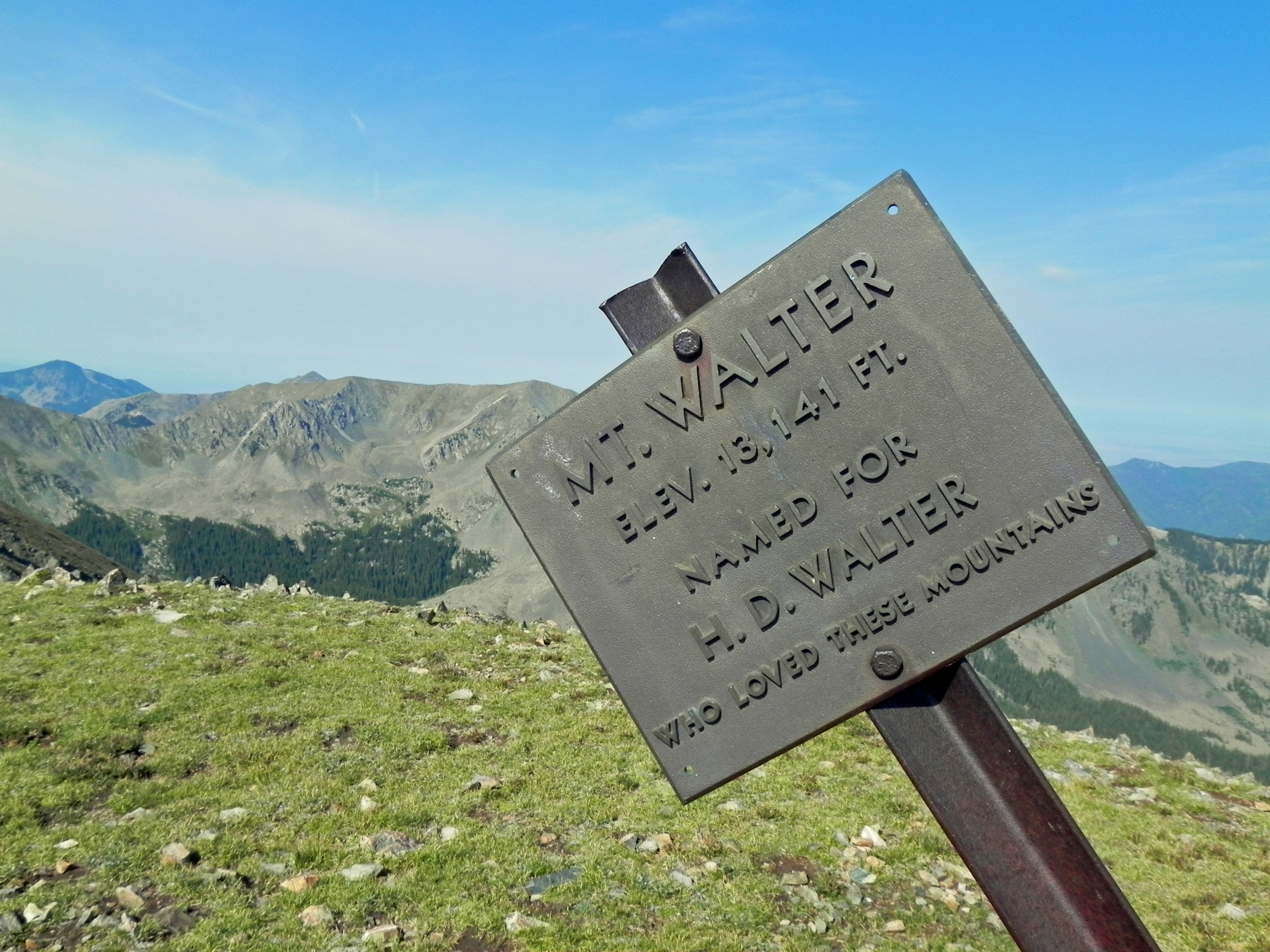

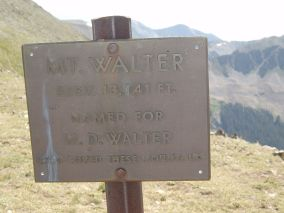
