= Lake Fork Peak =

Mountain summit in Taos County, New Mexico

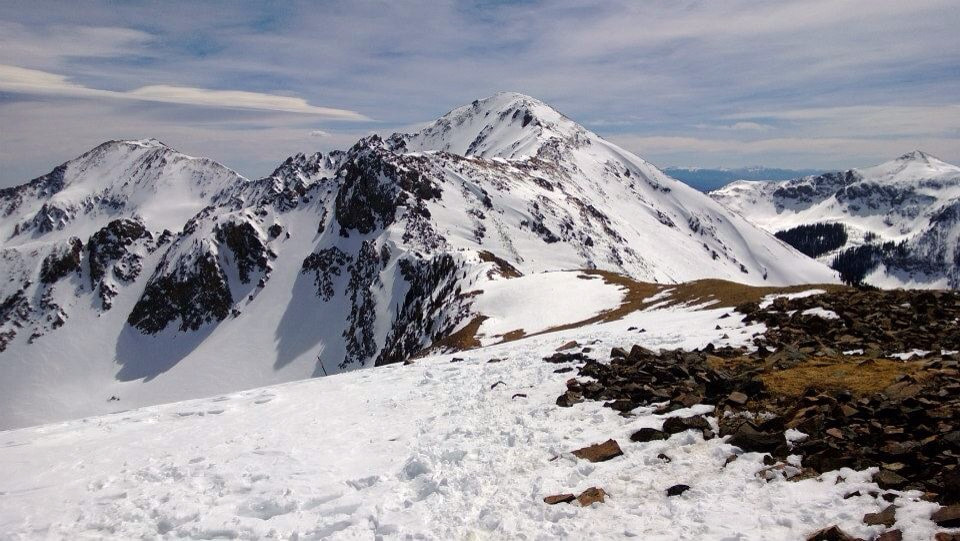
- North aspect, seen from Kachina Peak

Highest point
- Elevation: 12,881 ft (3,926 m)
- Prominence: 652 ft (199 m)
- Parent peak: Wheeler Peak
- Isolation: 1.63 mi (2.62 km)
- Coordinates: 36°33′01″N 105°26′43″W

Geography
- Location within New Mexico Location within the United States
- Country: United States
- State: New Mexico
- County: Taos
- Protected area: Wheeler Peak Wilderness
- Parent range: Taos Mountains; Sangre de Cristo Mountains; Rocky Mountains
- Topo map: USGS Wheeler Peak

Climbing
- Easiest route: class 2 hiking

Lake Fork Peak is a 12,881-foot-elevation (3,926 m) mountain summit in Taos County, New Mexico, United States.

== Description ==
Lake Fork Peak is part of the Taos Mountains which are a subset of the Sangre de Cristo Mountains. It is the second-highest point in the Wheeler Peak Wilderness and ranks as the sixth-highest summit in New Mexico. The mountain is located within the Carson National Forest, 12 miles northeast of the town of Taos and 1.24 miles west-southwest of Wheeler Peak, the highest point in the state. Precipitation runoff from the mountain drains to the Rio Hondo which is a tributary the Rio Grande. Topographic relief is significant as the summit rises 2,900 feet (880 meters) above the South Fork Rio Hondo in less than one mile (1.6 km). The mountain's toponym has been officially adopted by the United States Board on Geographic Names, and the name refers to Lake Fork which is a creek that originates between this peak and Wheeler Peak. The peak has also been known as Fairview Mountain.

== Climate ==
According to the Köppen climate classification system, Lake Fork Peak has an alpine climate with cold, snowy winters, and cool to warm summers. Due to its altitude, it receives precipitation all year, as snow in winter and as thunderstorms in summer. Climbers can expect afternoon rain, hail, and lightning from the seasonal monsoon in late July and August. This climate supports the Taos Ski Valley area immediately north of Lake Fork Peak.

== See also ==
- List of mountain peaks of New Mexico

== Gallery ==
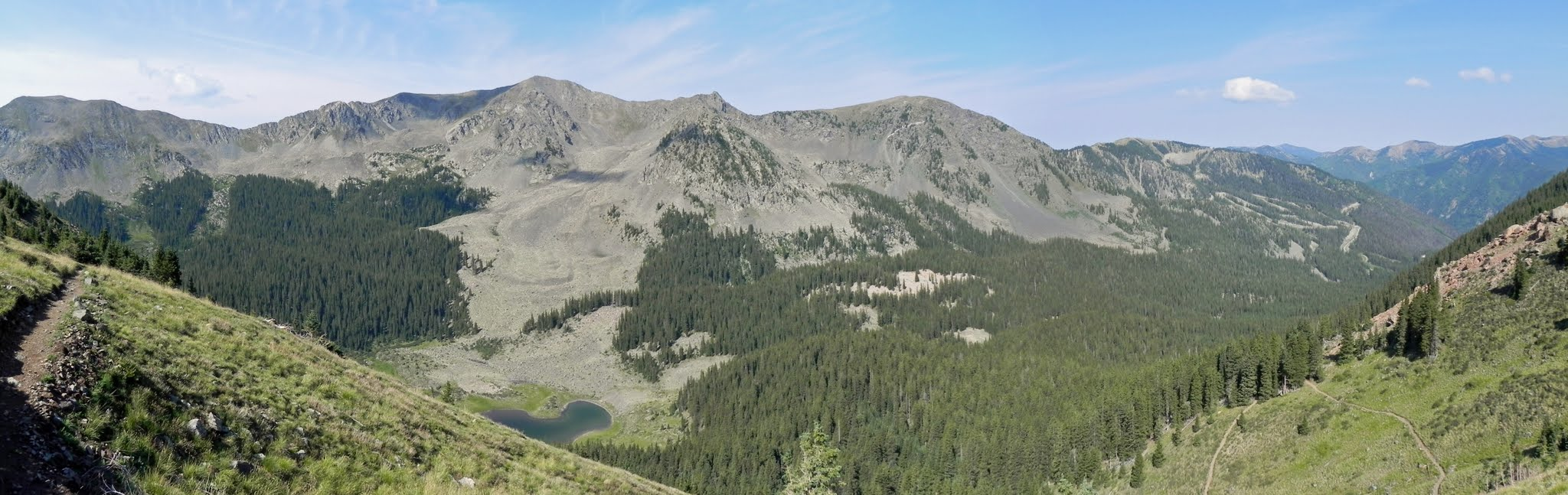
East aspect of Lake Fork Peak (highest point on skyline left of center)

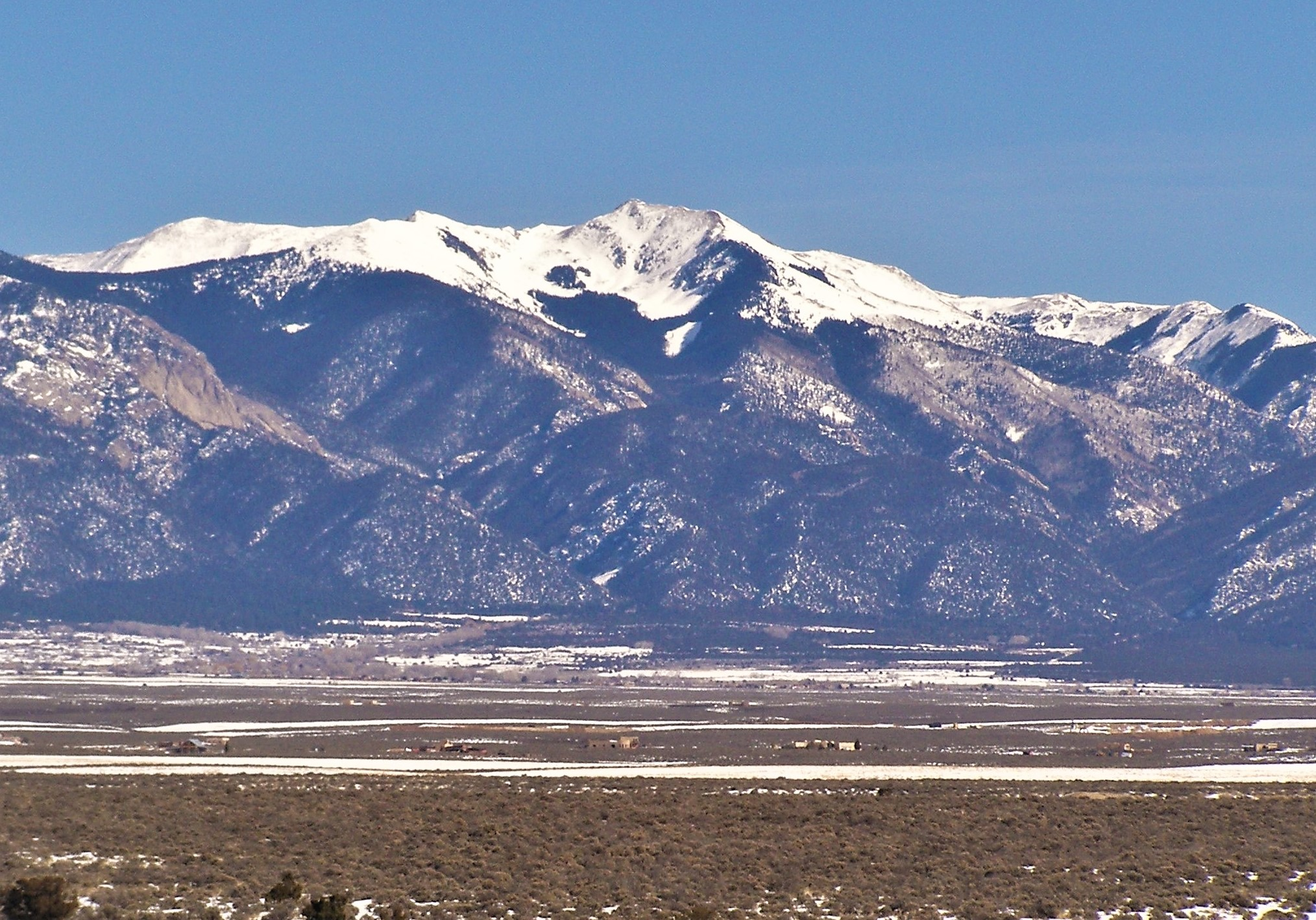
Vallecito Mountain (center) and Lake Fork Peak (left)

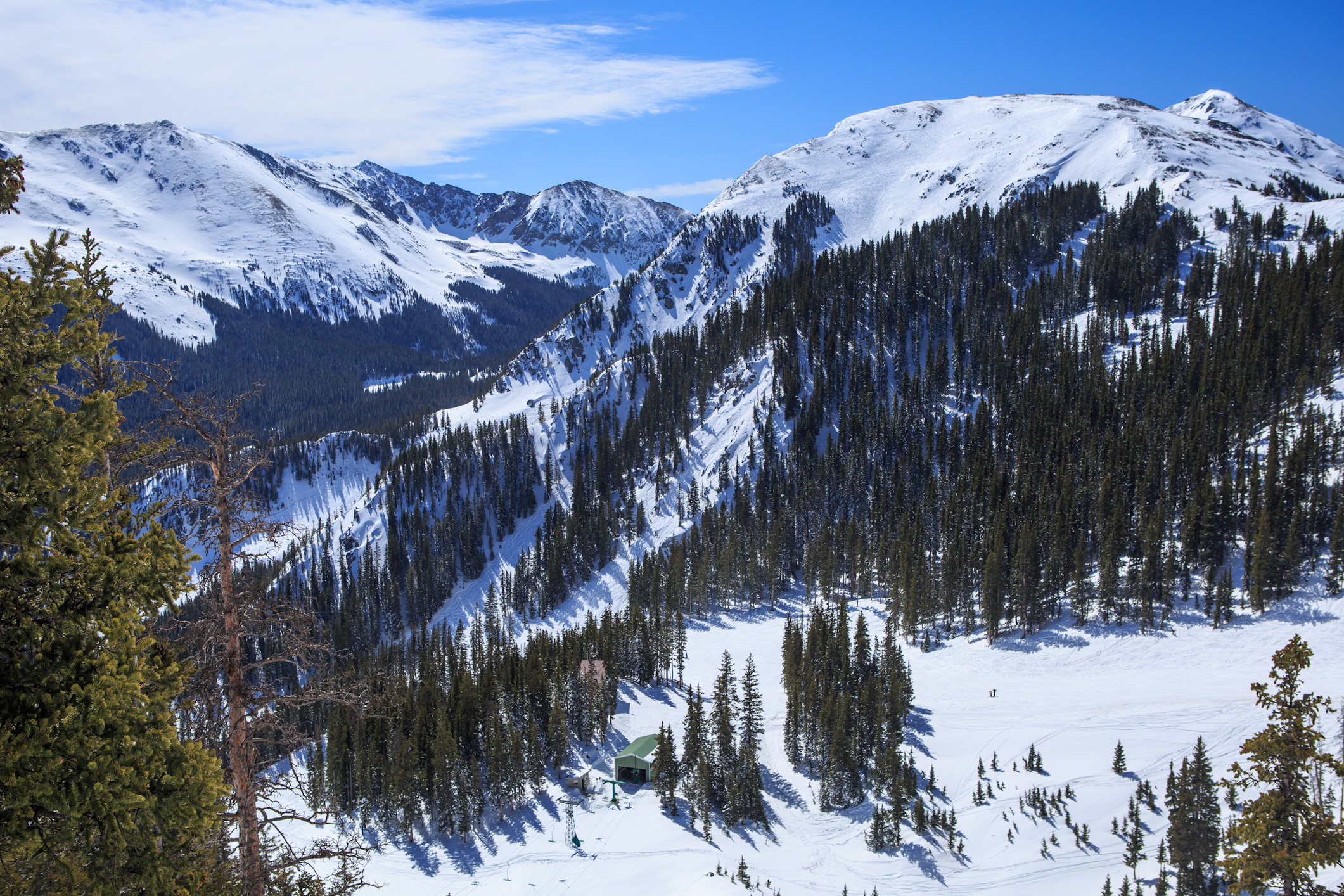
Taos Ski Valley with top of Lake Fork Peak visible in upper right corner behind Kachina Peak
