= Pueblo Peak =

Mountain in New Mexico, United States

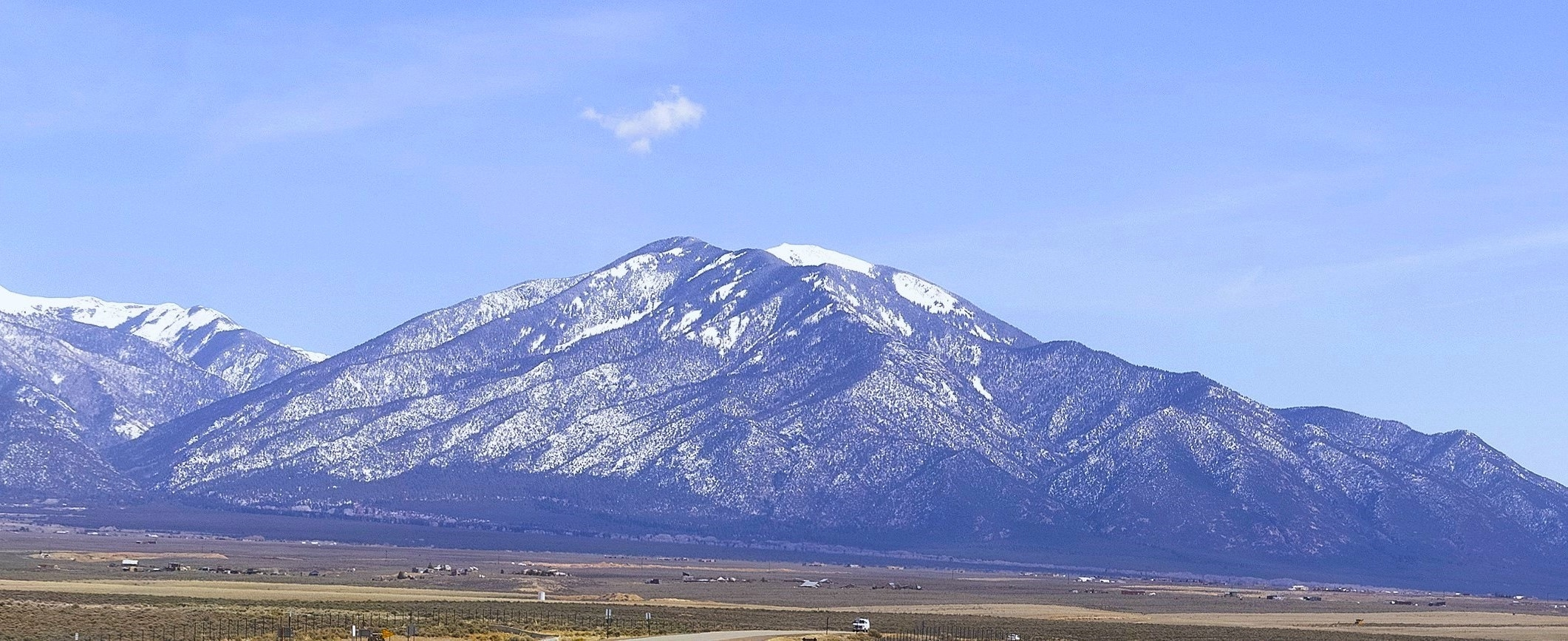
- West aspect

Highest point
- Elevation: 12,303 ft (3,750 m)
- Prominence: 1,253 ft (382 m)
- Parent peak: Wheeler Peak
- Isolation: 3.19 mi (5.13 km)
- Coordinates: 36°29′28″N 105°28′59″W

Naming
- Etymology: Pueblo

Geography
- Location within New Mexico Location within the United States
- Country: United States
- State: New Mexico
- County: Taos
- Protected area: Pueblo de Taos Reservation
- Parent range: Taos Mountains; Sangre de Cristo Mountains; Rocky Mountains
- Topo map: USGS Pueblo Peak

Geology
- Rock age: Proterozoic
- Rock type: Volcanic rock

Climbing
- Easiest route: class 2 hiking

Pueblo Peak is a 12,303-foot-elevation (3,750-meter) summit in Taos County, New Mexico, United States.

== Description ==
Pueblo Peak is part of the Taos Mountains which are a subset of the Sangre de Cristo Mountains, and it ranks as the 27th-highest summit in New Mexico. The mountain is located nine miles (14 km) northeast of the city of Taos and six miles southwest of Wheeler Peak, the highest point in the state. Precipitation runoff from the mountain drains into tributaries of the Rio Grande, which is approximately 13 miles (21 km) to the west. Topographic relief is significant as the summit rises over 3,300 feet (1,006 meters) above Lucero Canyon in 1.45 mile (2.33 km). The mountain is especially sacred to the people of Taos Pueblo, and it is named after their pueblo. However, they call the mountain móxwoluną, which means "The High One." This mountain's toponym has been officially adopted by the United States Board on Geographic Names.

== Climate ==
According to the Köppen climate classification system, Pueblo Peak has an alpine climate with cold, snowy winters, and cool to warm summers. Due to its altitude, it receives precipitation all year, as snow in winter and as thunderstorms in summer. Climbers can expect afternoon rain, hail, and lightning from the seasonal monsoon in late July and August.

== See also ==
- List of mountain peaks of New Mexico
