= Williams Lake (New Mexico) =

Lake in New Mexico

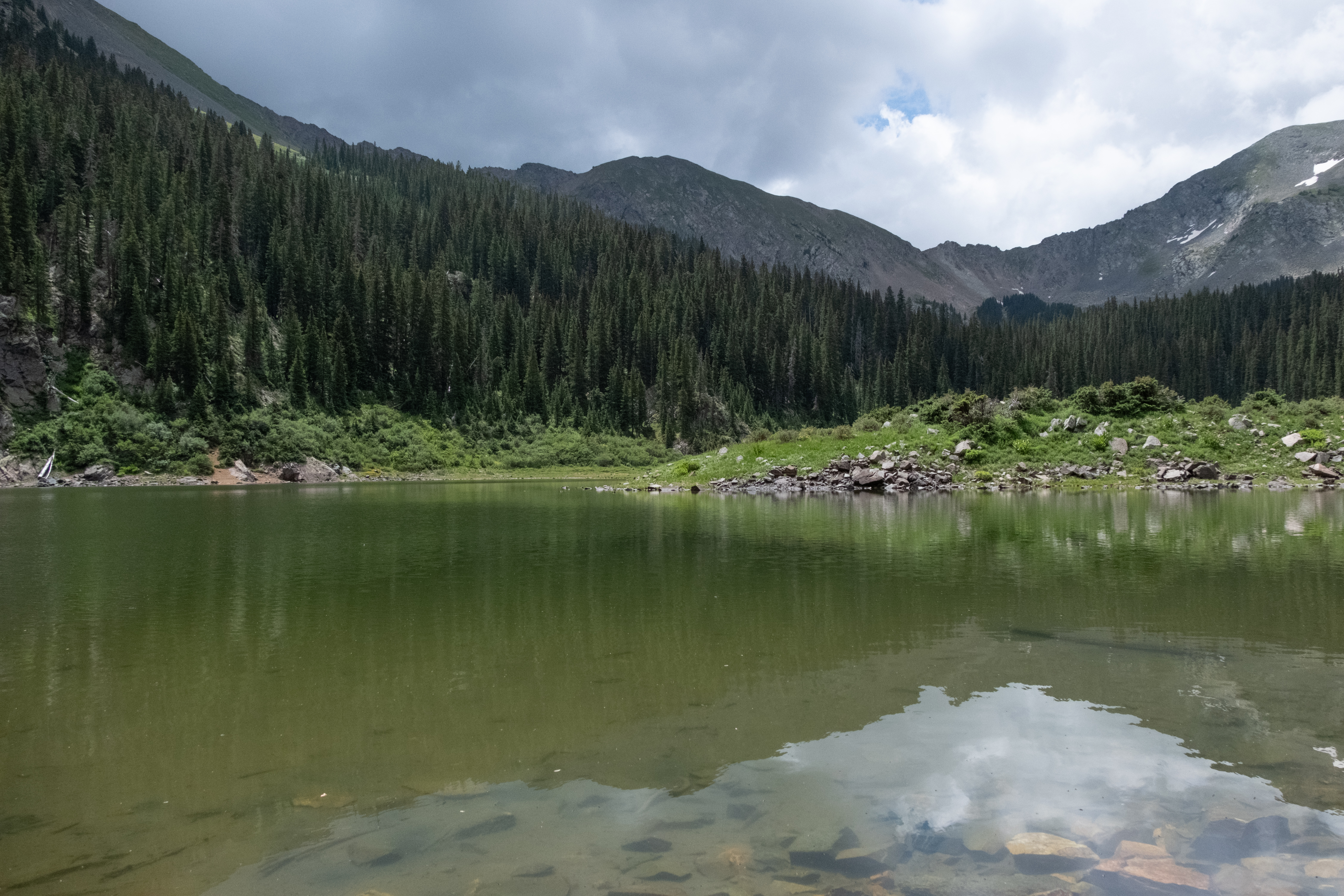
- Williams Lake in July 2024.

- Location within New Mexico Location within the United States
- Location: Taos County, New Mexico, United States
- Coordinates: 36.556222°N 105.429437°W
- Type: Glacial
- Basin countries: United States
- Max. length: 0.10 mi (0.16 km)
- Max. width: 0.07 mi (0.11 km)
- Surface elevation: 11,040 ft (3,360 m)

Williams Lake is an alpine lake in Taos County, New Mexico, United States, located high in the Sangre de Cristo Mountains below Wheeler Peak in the Wheeler Peak Wilderness of Carson National Forest. The lake is accessible via the Williams Lake Trail from the trailhead in Taos Ski Valley. The lake does not contain fish because it freezes during the winter.

The name of the lake is in reference to William Frazer, a gold miner who staked claims in the area and co-founded the mining camp of Twining during the late 1800s.

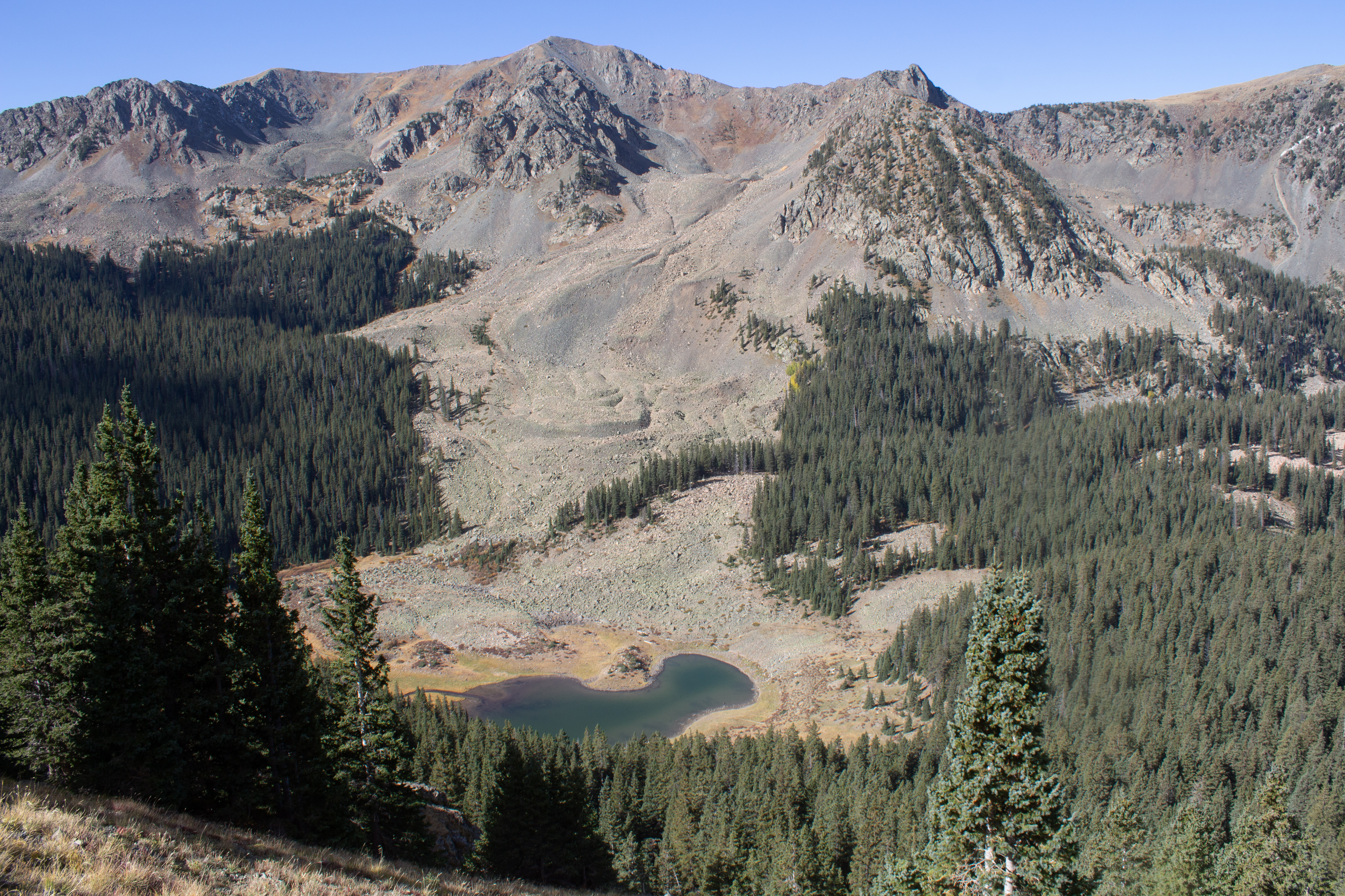
Williams Lake from Wheeler Peak
