= Venado Peak =

Mountain in New Mexico, United States

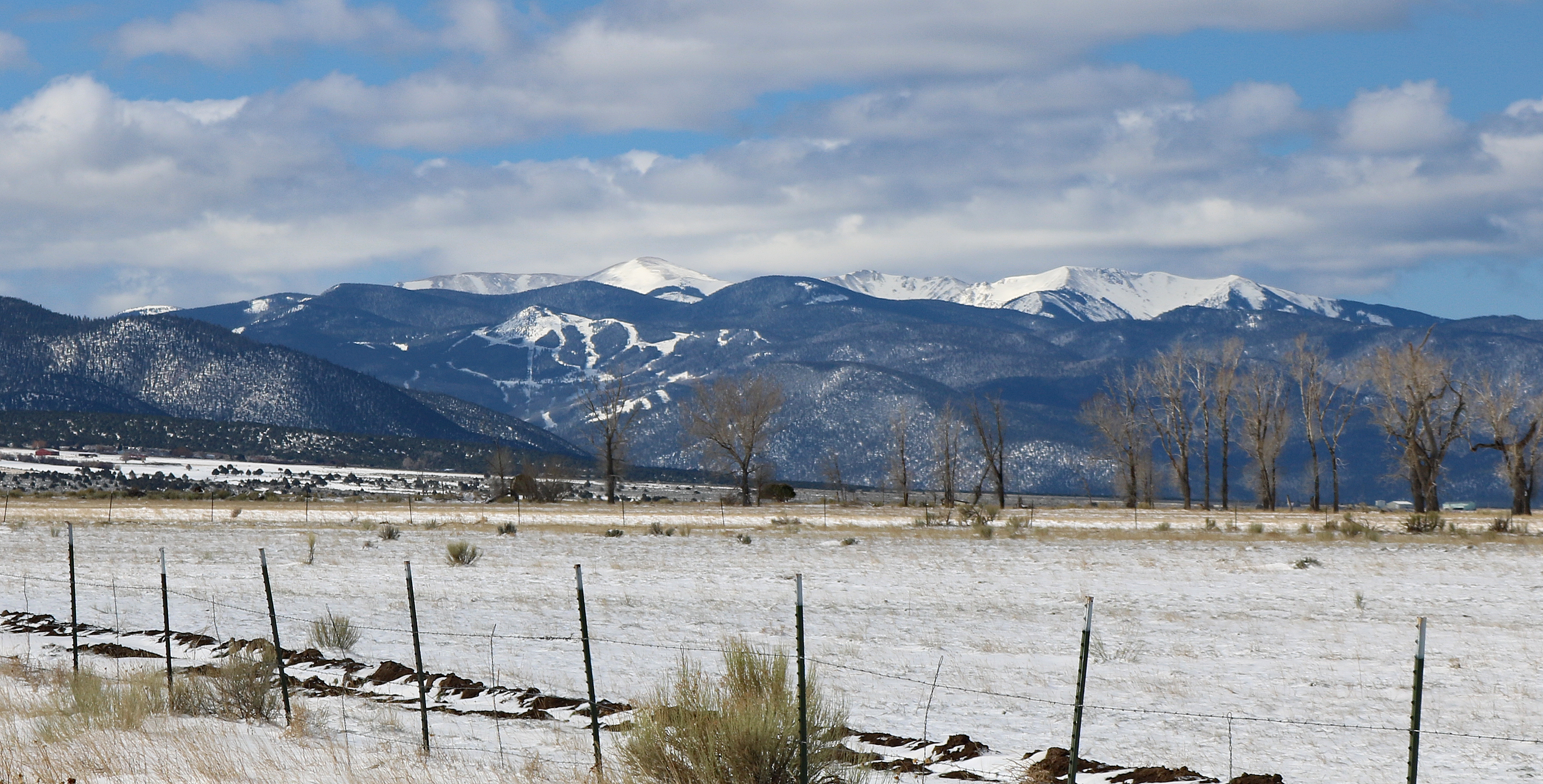
- Some of the peaks in the Taos Mountains group, viewed from south of San Luis, Colorado.

Highest point
- Elevation: 12,739 ft (3,883 m) NAVD 88
- Prominence: 2,934 ft (894 m)
- Coordinates: 36°47′30″N 105°29′36″W

Geography
- Location within New Mexico
- Location: Taos County, New Mexico, U.S.
- Parent range: Taos Mountains, Sangre de Cristo Mountains, Rocky Mountains
- Topo map: USGS Latir Peak

Climbing
- Easiest route: Hike

Venado Peak is one of the major peaks of the Taos Mountains group of the Sangre de Cristo Mountains, a subrange of the Rocky Mountains. It is located in Taos County, New Mexico, about 8 miles (13 km) northeast of the town of Questa. Its summit is the highest point in the Latir Peak Wilderness, part of Carson National Forest. The peak's name means "deer" in Spanish.

The high point of the group of peaks north of the Red River and southwest of Costilla Creek, Venado Peak ranks tenth by elevation and sixth by topographic prominence in the state.

Other peaks in the group include Latir Peak, 12,708 feet (3,873 m), Virsylvia Peak, 12,594 feet (3,839 m), Cabresto Peak, 12,448 feet (3,794 m), Baldy Mountain, 12,048 feet (3,672 m) and Pinabete Peak, 11,948 feet (3,642 m). (The origins of the names "Latir" and "Virsylvia" are unknown, while "Cabresto" means "rope" or "halter" and "Pinabete" means "pine tree" in Spanish.) Latir Peak is the most well-known of the entire group, despite not being the highest peak, and is the namesake for the surrounding wilderness area, nine small alpine lakes on the northeast side of the group, and a creek draining those lakes. Despite being significantly lower than the other peaks, Pinabete peak is just as visually prominent, as it is the end of a long ridge jutting out southwest toward the plains near Questa. It rises about 4,250 feet (1,300 m) above the plain in about 4 miles (6 km).

Just south of the group is Cabresto Creek, and also Cabresto Lake, a popular fishing destination with an established Forest Service campground. The Latir Lakes, and the entire northeast side of the group, are owned by the Rio Costilla Cattle Association, which allows recreational access for a fee. On the southeast side of the group lies Heart Lake. The peaks themselves can be accessed from either Cabresto Lake (via the Lake Fork, Bull Creek, and Heart Lake Trails) or Latir Lakes.

Geologically, the Taos Mountains have a Precambrian metamorphic core, about 1.7 billion years old. However, the region around Venado Peak also includes Tertiary volcanic rocks such as tuff, as well as the remnants of "a complex and mineral-rich caldera that formed about 25 million years ago." Most of the summit areas are broad, and covered with alpine tundra; the tree line lies between 11,000 feet (3,400 m) and 12,000 feet (3,700 m). A notable feature of the group is the large, gently sloped Latir Mesa, lying south of Latir Peak at elevations between 12,200 feet (3,700 m) and 12,600 feet (3,800 m).

== Climate ==
Venado Peak has an Alpine climate (Köppen ET).

Climate data for Venado Peak 36.7920 N, 105.4931 W, Elevation: 12,434 ft (3,790 m) (1991–2020 normals)
Month	Jan	Feb	Mar	Apr	May	Jun	Jul	Aug	Sep	Oct	Nov	Dec	Year
Mean daily maximum °F (°C)	27.5 (−2.5)	27.7 (−2.4)	32.9 (0.5)	37.6 (3.1)	46.7 (8.2)	58.2 (14.6)	61.8 (16.6)	59.5 (15.3)	53.6 (12.0)	43.5 (6.4)	34.5 (1.4)	27.8 (−2.3)	42.6 (5.9)
Daily mean °F (°C)	16.3 (−8.7)	16.3 (−8.7)	21.1 (−6.1)	25.8 (−3.4)	34.7 (1.5)	45.1 (7.3)	49.1 (9.5)	47.5 (8.6)	41.9 (5.5)	32.5 (0.3)	23.7 (−4.6)	16.8 (−8.4)	30.9 (−0.6)
Mean daily minimum °F (°C)	5.0 (−15.0)	4.8 (−15.1)	9.3 (−12.6)	14.0 (−10.0)	22.7 (−5.2)	32.0 (0.0)	36.4 (2.4)	35.5 (1.9)	30.3 (−0.9)	21.4 (−5.9)	12.9 (−10.6)	5.8 (−14.6)	19.2 (−7.1)
Average precipitation inches (mm)	2.77 (70)	2.89 (73)	3.76 (96)	3.69 (94)	2.66 (68)	1.34 (34)	4.11 (104)	3.86 (98)	2.81 (71)	2.83 (72)	3.18 (81)	2.82 (72)	36.72 (933)
Source: PRISM Climate Group
