= Latir Peak Wilderness =

Wilderness area in New Mexico, United States

- IUCN category Ib (wilderness area)
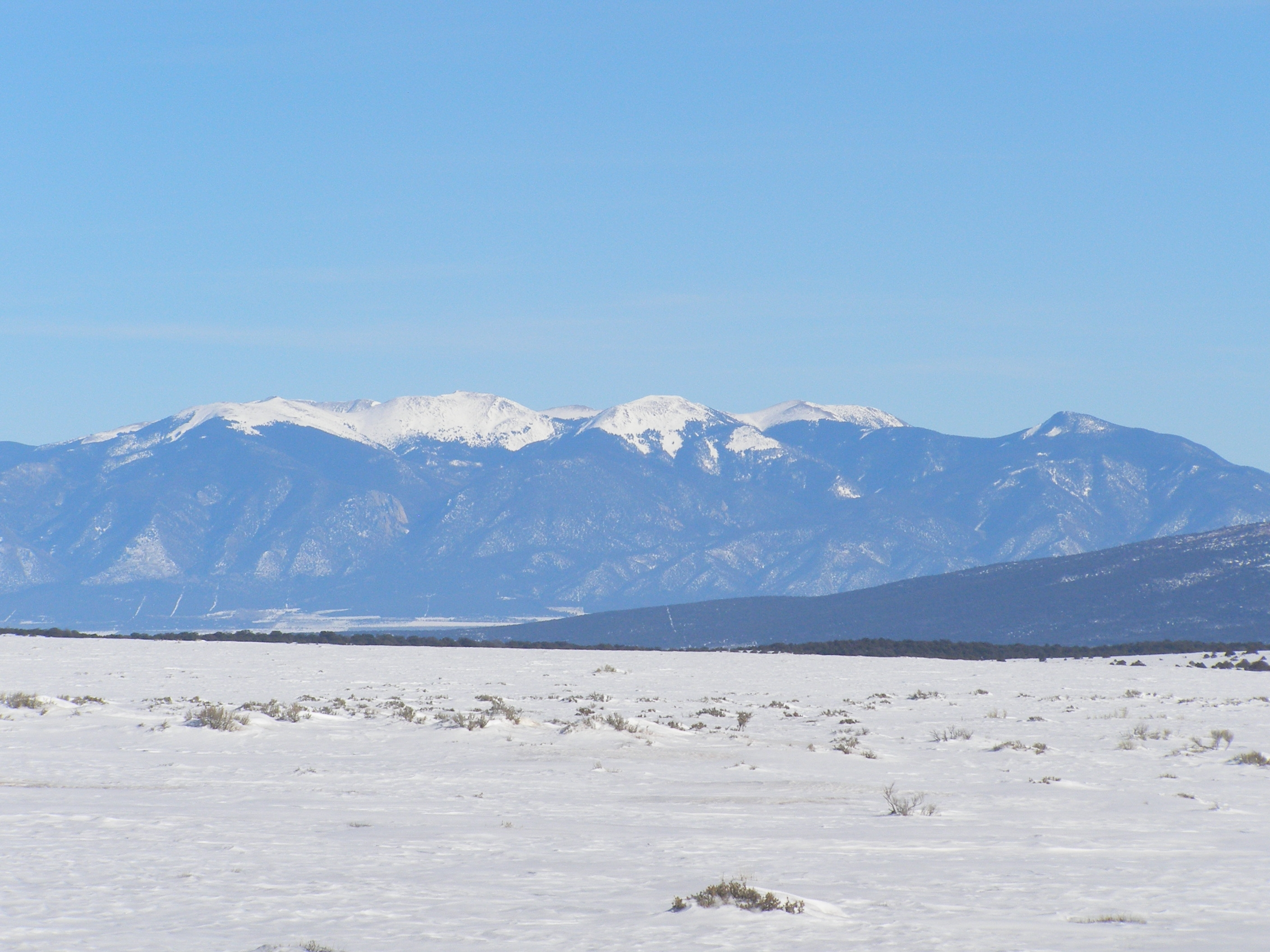
- Interactive map of Latir Peak Wilderness
- Location: Taos County, New Mexico, United States
- Nearest city: Questa, New Mexico
- Coordinates: 36°47′51″N 105°28′52″W
- Area: 20,506 acres (8,298 ha)
- Established: 1980
- Governing body: U.S. Forest Service

Latir Peak Wilderness is a 20,506-acre (8,298 ha) wilderness area located within the Carson National Forest in northern New Mexico. Designated in 1980, the wilderness is composed of dense forest, meadows, and alpine tundra on Latir Mesa in the northern portion. It includes a portion of the Sangre de Cristo Mountains and contains Venado Peak at 12,734 feet (3,881 m), Latir Peak at 12,708 feet (3,873 m), Latir Mesa at 12,692 feet (3,869 m), and Virsylvia Peak at 12,594 feet (3,839 m). Most of the area is drained by the Lake Fork of Cabresto Creek, which originates at Heart Lake and is impounded just outside the wilderness in Cabresto Lake, the main trailhead for visitors entering the wilderness.

== Wildlife ==
A variety of wildlife can be found in Latir Peak Wilderness, including mule deer, black bear, badger, beaver, bobcat, coyote, ferret, fox, mountain lion, boreal owl, marmot, marten, pika, ptarmigan, and muskrat. Native Rio Grande cutthroat trout are found in the area's streams.

== Gallery ==
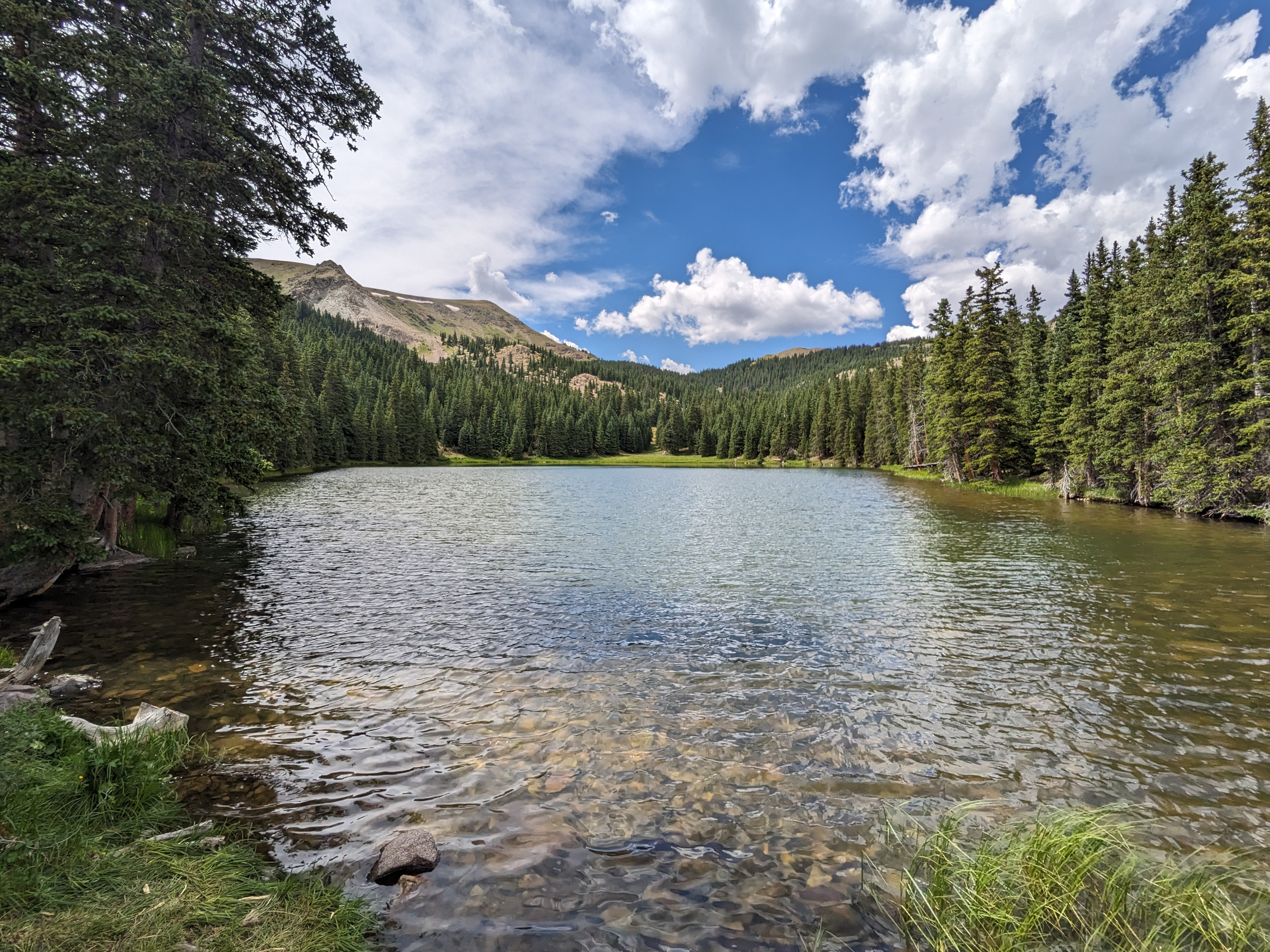
Heart Lake, one of the many lakes in the area

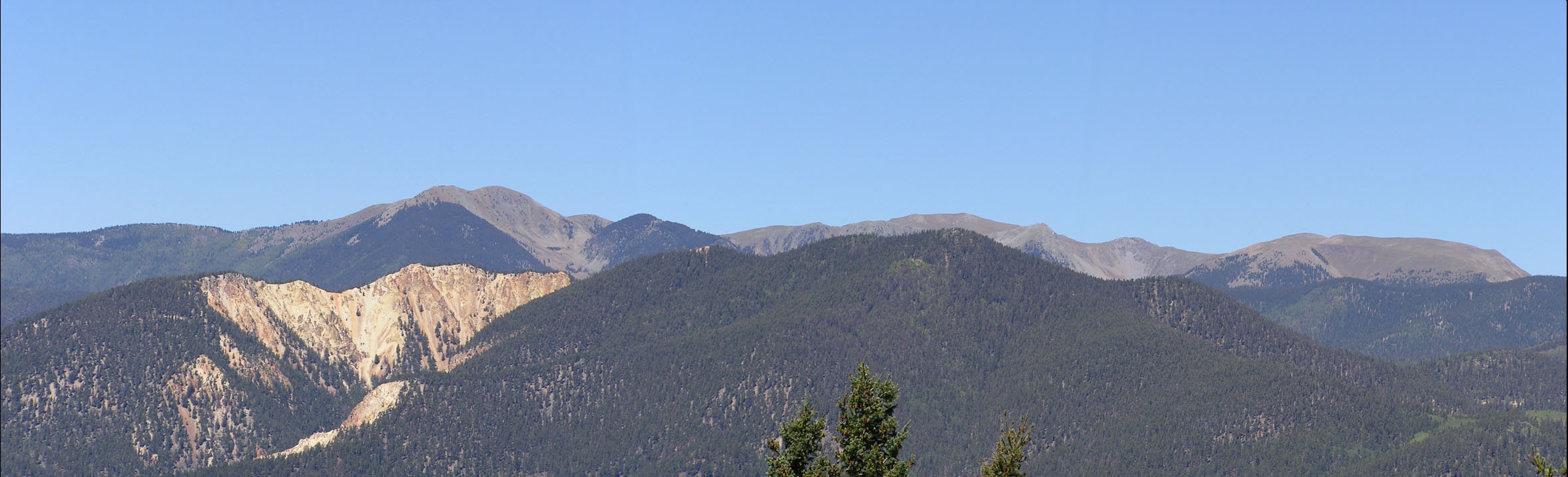
A panorama of the Latir Peak Wilderness from Red River Pass

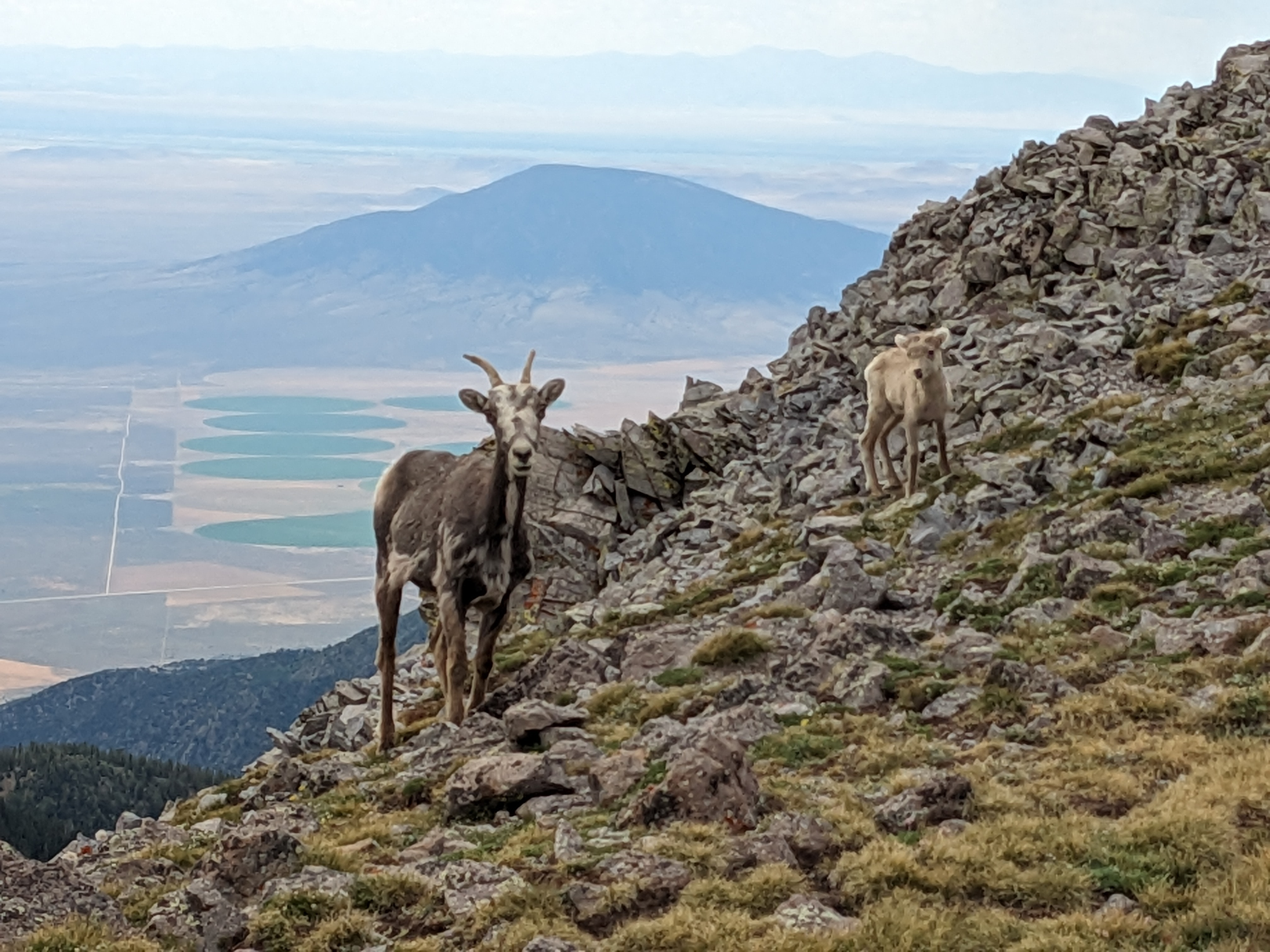
Mountain goats grazing Latir Peak in midsummer

== See also ==
- Latir volcanic field
- List of U.S. Wilderness Areas
- Wilderness Act
