= Wheeler Peak (New Mexico) =

Mountain in New Mexico, United States

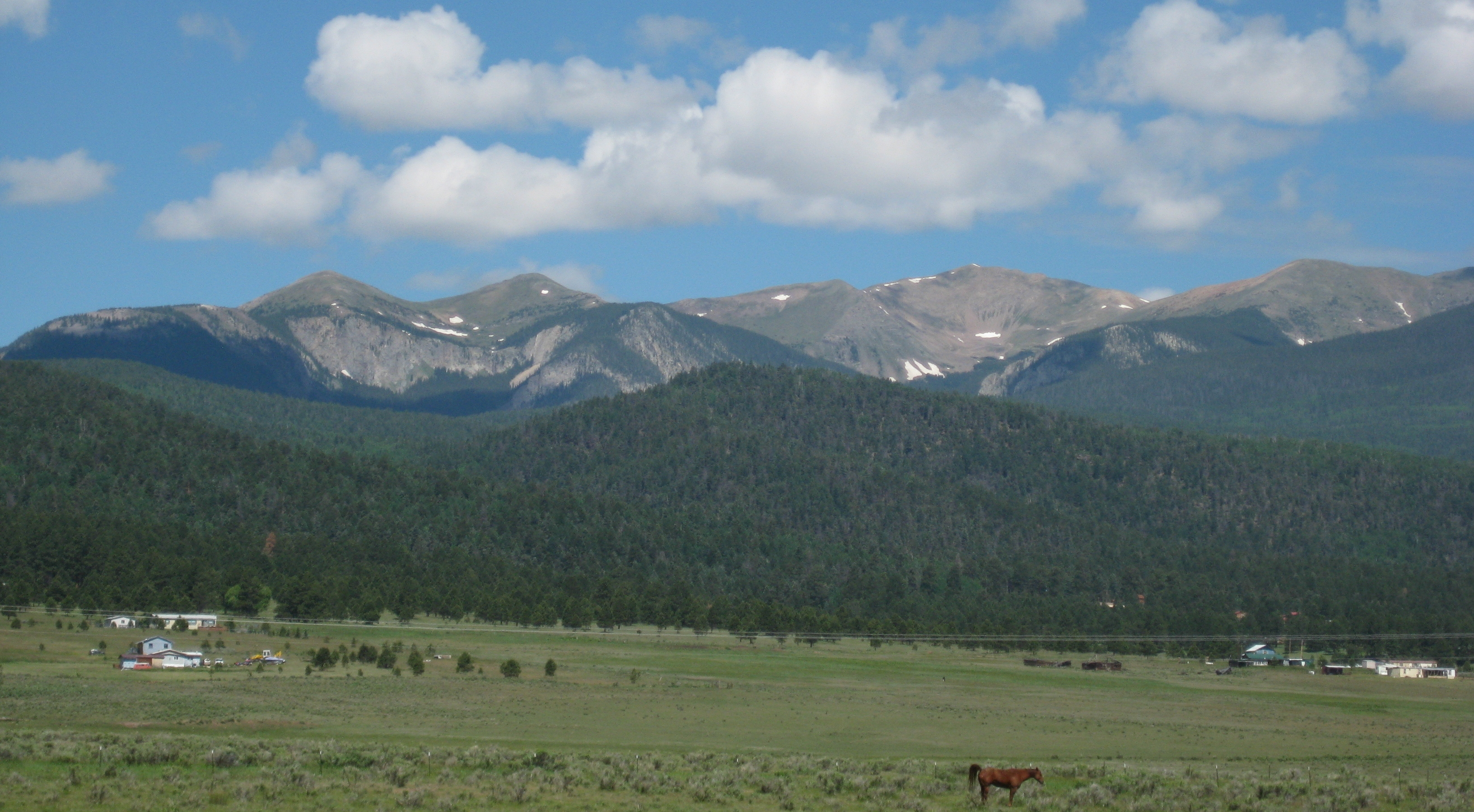
- Wheeler Peak

Highest point
- Elevation: 13,167 ft (4,013 m) NAVD 88
- Prominence: 3,409 ft (1,039 m)
- Parent peak: Vermejo Peak
- Listing: North America highest peaks 119th; US highest major peaks 98th; U.S. state high point 8th
- Coordinates: 36°33′25″N 105°25′01″W

Geography
- Location within New Mexico
- Location: Taos County, New Mexico, U.S.
- Parent range: Taos Mountains
- Topo map: USGS Wheeler Peak

Climbing
- Easiest route: Williams Lake

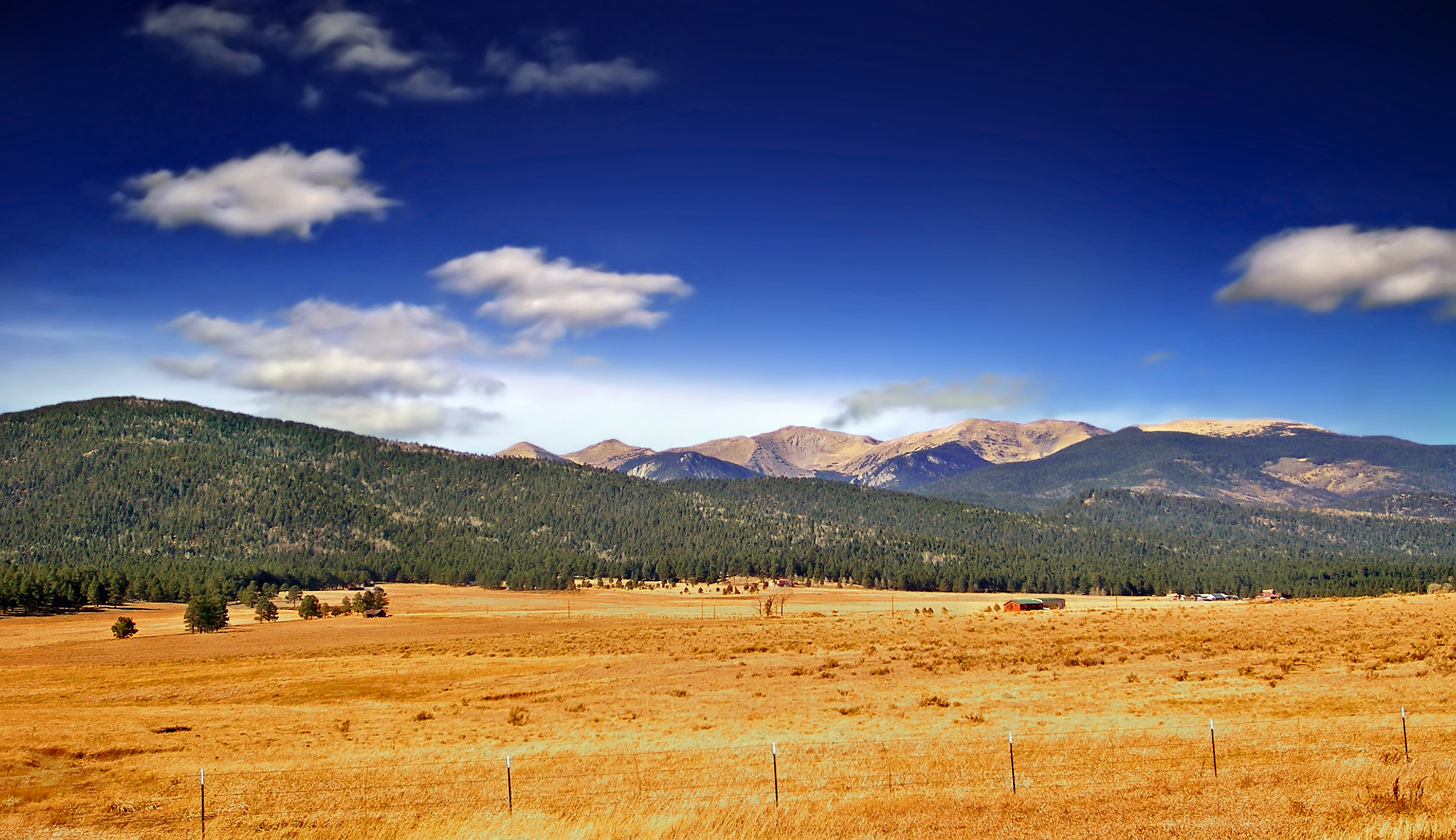
Wheeler Peak and surrounding peaks, viewed from Eagle Nest, New Mexico

Wheeler Peak is the highest natural point in the U.S. state of New Mexico. It is located northeast of Taos and south of Red River in the northern part of the state, and just 2 miles (3.2 km) southeast of the ski slopes of Taos Ski Valley. It lies in the Sangre de Cristo Mountains, the southernmost subrange of the Rocky Mountains. The peak's elevation is 13,167 feet (4,013 m).

Formerly named Taos Peak, after the nearby town of Taos, New Mexico, it was renamed Wheeler Peak in 1950. A plaque at the summit states that the mountain was:

Named in honor of Major George Montague Wheeler (1832–1909) who for ten years led a party of surveyors and naturalists collecting geologic, biologic, planimetric and topographic data in New Mexico and six other southwestern states.

The mountain contains Blue Lake, a sacred emergence site for the people of Taos Pueblo. The Taos call the mountain móxwoluną or poxwiap’íanenemа̨.

== Nearby peaks and features ==
Just north of Wheeler Peak is Mount Walter. At 13,141 feet (4,005 m) it is the second highest named summit in New Mexico, but it is not usually considered an independent peak as it has only about 53 feet (16 m) of topographic prominence. It is sometimes mistaken for Wheeler Peak, since it is along the standard route to Wheeler. Lake Fork Peak at 12,881 feet (3,926 m) lies just across Williams Lake and to the west of Wheeler Mountain.

Taos Ski Valley lies to the northwest of Wheeler Peak, while both the town of Taos and Taos Pueblo are about 15 miles (24 km) to the southwest.

Wheeler Peak is the focus of the 19,661-acre (79.57 km^{2}) Wheeler Peak Wilderness area in the Carson National Forest. Much of the mountain area just south of the peak is on Taos Pueblo land. Some 48,000 acres (190 km^{2}) was returned to the pueblo from the Carson National Forest in 1970 and another 764 acres (3.09 km^{2}) in 1996.

== Climate ==
Climate data for Wheeler Peak 36.5619 N, 105.4181 W, Elevation: 12,789 ft (3,898 m) (1991–2020 normals)
Month	Jan	Feb	Mar	Apr	May	Jun	Jul	Aug	Sep	Oct	Nov	Dec	Year
Mean daily maximum °F (°C)	27.1 (−2.7)	27.3 (−2.6)	32.3 (0.2)	36.1 (2.3)	45.3 (7.4)	56.5 (13.6)	59.9 (15.5)	57.7 (14.3)	51.7 (10.9)	41.8 (5.4)	34.0 (1.1)	27.4 (−2.6)	41.4 (5.2)
Daily mean °F (°C)	15.6 (−9.1)	15.5 (−9.2)	20.1 (−6.6)	24.4 (−4.2)	33.3 (0.7)	43.4 (6.3)	47.4 (8.6)	45.9 (7.7)	40.3 (4.6)	31.0 (−0.6)	23.0 (−5.0)	16.3 (−8.7)	29.7 (−1.3)
Mean daily minimum °F (°C)	4.2 (−15.4)	3.8 (−15.7)	7.9 (−13.4)	12.7 (−10.7)	21.2 (−6.0)	30.4 (−0.9)	34.8 (1.6)	34.0 (1.1)	28.8 (−1.8)	20.2 (−6.6)	11.9 (−11.2)	5.2 (−14.9)	17.9 (−7.8)
Average precipitation inches (mm)	3.44 (87)	3.23 (82)	4.41 (112)	4.13 (105)	3.00 (76)	1.34 (34)	3.49 (89)	4.10 (104)	3.18 (81)	3.08 (78)	3.73 (95)	3.69 (94)	40.82 (1,037)
Source: PRISM Climate Group

== Climbing ==
The standard route on Wheeler Peak is along the north ridge. The route starts at the parking lot for Taos Ski Valley, and proceeds east along an old road to a broad saddle at Bull-of-the-Woods Meadow. It then turns south and winds its way among minor peaks and small valleys to gain Wheeler Peak from the north, going over the summit of Mount Walter along the way. This is a practical route, even in winter, due to low (but nonzero) avalanche exposure.

An alternate route is to hike south from Taos Ski Valley to Williams Lake, then take a newly constructed switchback trail to the top. This trail was completed in 2011 by a Forest Service trail crew from the Gallatin National Forest, 8 people working 12 hours per day, building 4 miles of new trail with hand tools to the top in 14 days.

Another alternate route is to begin from the nearby ski resort of Red River. From the town of Red River drive 6.4 miles south on NM 578, then 1.3 miles on FR 58 to the trailhead parking area. From the parking area Wheeler peak is about 7 miles on Forest Trail 91. This route passes two alpine lakes, Lost Lake and Horseshoe Lake.

Wheeler Peak has a summit register as do many major western peaks.

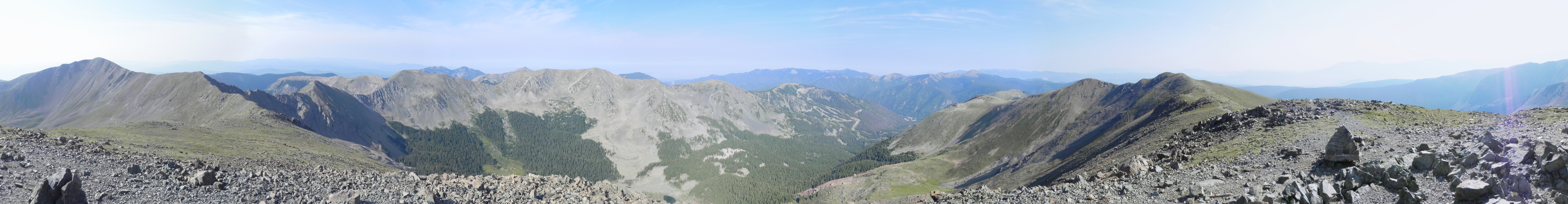
Panorama from Wheeler Peak

== See also ==
- List of mountain peaks of North America
  - List of mountain peaks of the United States
    - List of U.S. states by elevation
