= Sangre de Cristo Mountains =

Mountain range in Colorado and New Mexico, United States

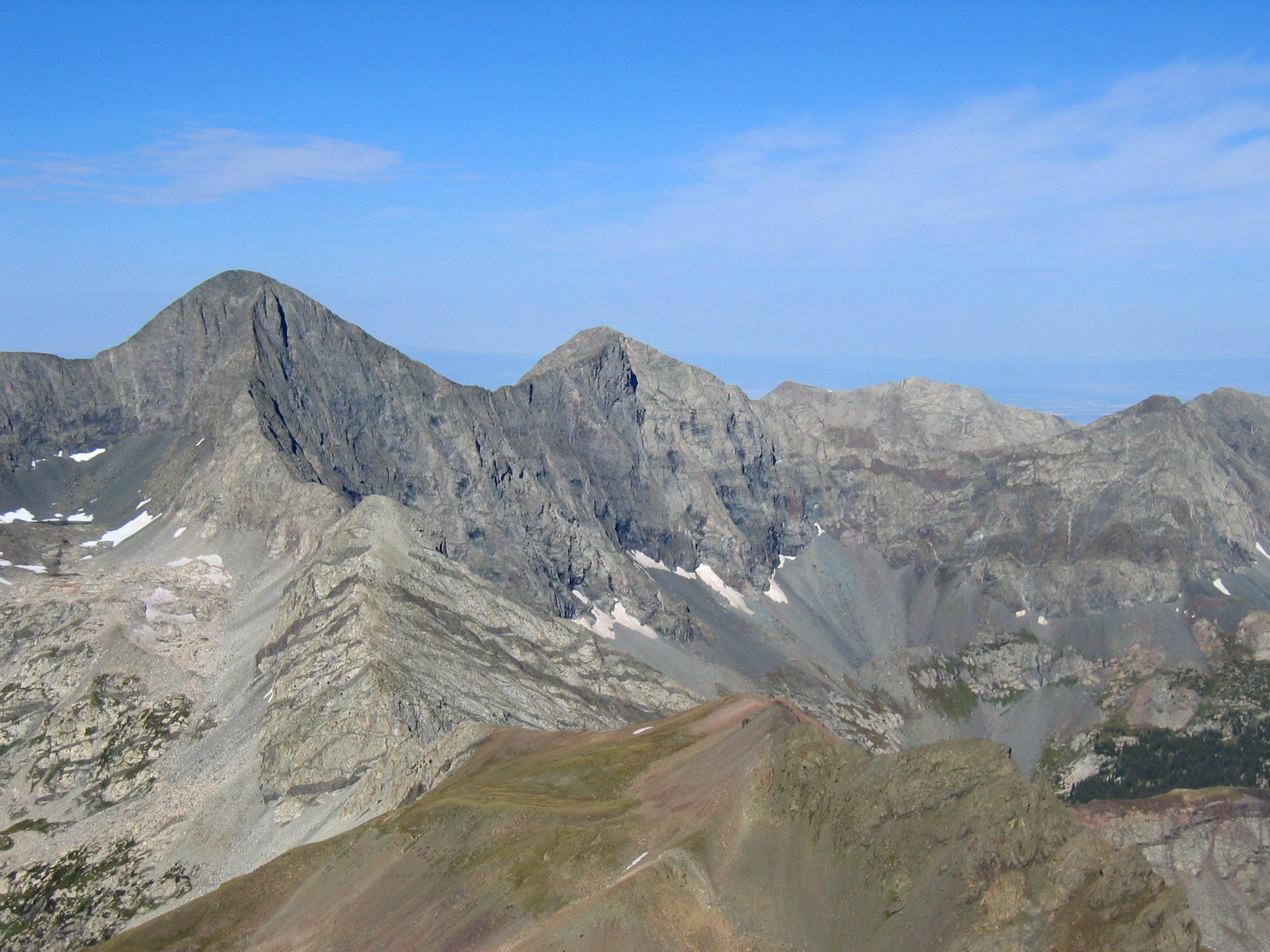
- Blanca Peak

Highest point
- Peak: Blanca Peak, East of Alamosa, Colorado
- Elevation: 14,351 ft (4,374 m)
- Listing: Mountain ranges of Colorado
- Coordinates: 37°34′39″N 105°29′08″W

Dimensions
- Length: 242 mi (389 km) north-south
- Width: 120 mi (190 km) east-west
- Area: 17,193 mi^{2} (44,530 km^{2})

Naming
- Etymology: Sangre de Cristo (Spanish: Blood of Christ)

Geography
- Country: United States
- States: Colorado; New Mexico
- Parent range: Rocky Mountains

The Sangre de Cristo Mountains (Spanish for "Blood of Christ") are the southernmost subrange of the Rocky Mountains. They are located in southern Colorado and northern New Mexico in the United States. The mountains run from Poncha Pass in South-Central Colorado, trending southeast and south, ending at Glorieta Pass, southeast of Santa Fe, New Mexico. The mountains contain a number of fourteen thousand foot peaks (roughly 4,300 m) in the Colorado portion, as well as several peaks in New Mexico which are over thirteen thousand feet (roughly 4,000 m).

The name of the mountains may refer to the occasional reddish hues observed during sunrise and sunset, and when alpenglow occurs, especially when the mountains are covered with snow. Although the particular origin of the name is unclear, it has been in use since the early 19th century. Before that time the terms "La Sierra Nevada", "La Sierra Madre", "La Sierra", and "The Snowies" (used by English speakers) were used. According to legend, "sangre de Cristo" were the last words of a priest who was killed by Native Americans.

== Land management and recreation overview ==
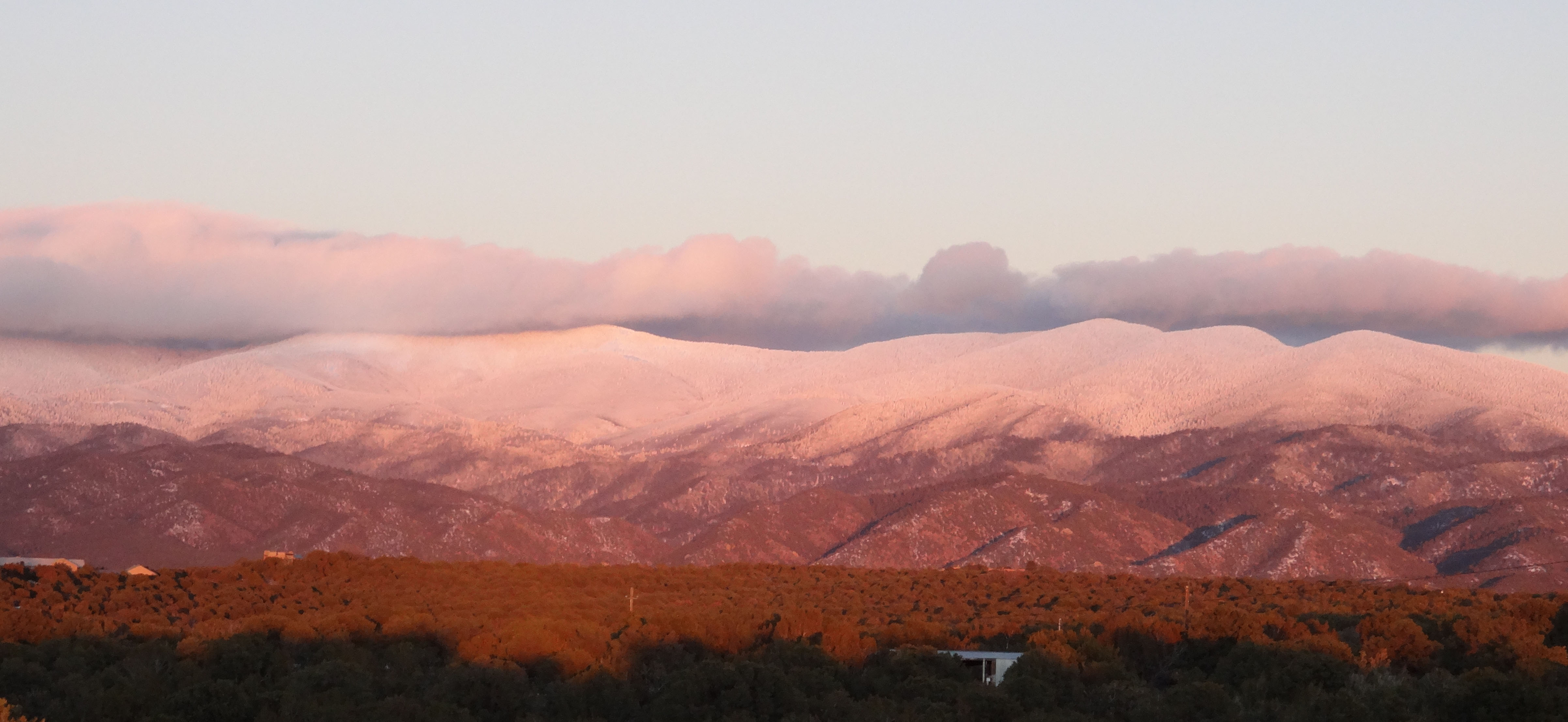
Sangre de Cristo Mountains to the East of Santa Fe, taken during a winter sunset after a snowfall on 29 January 2013

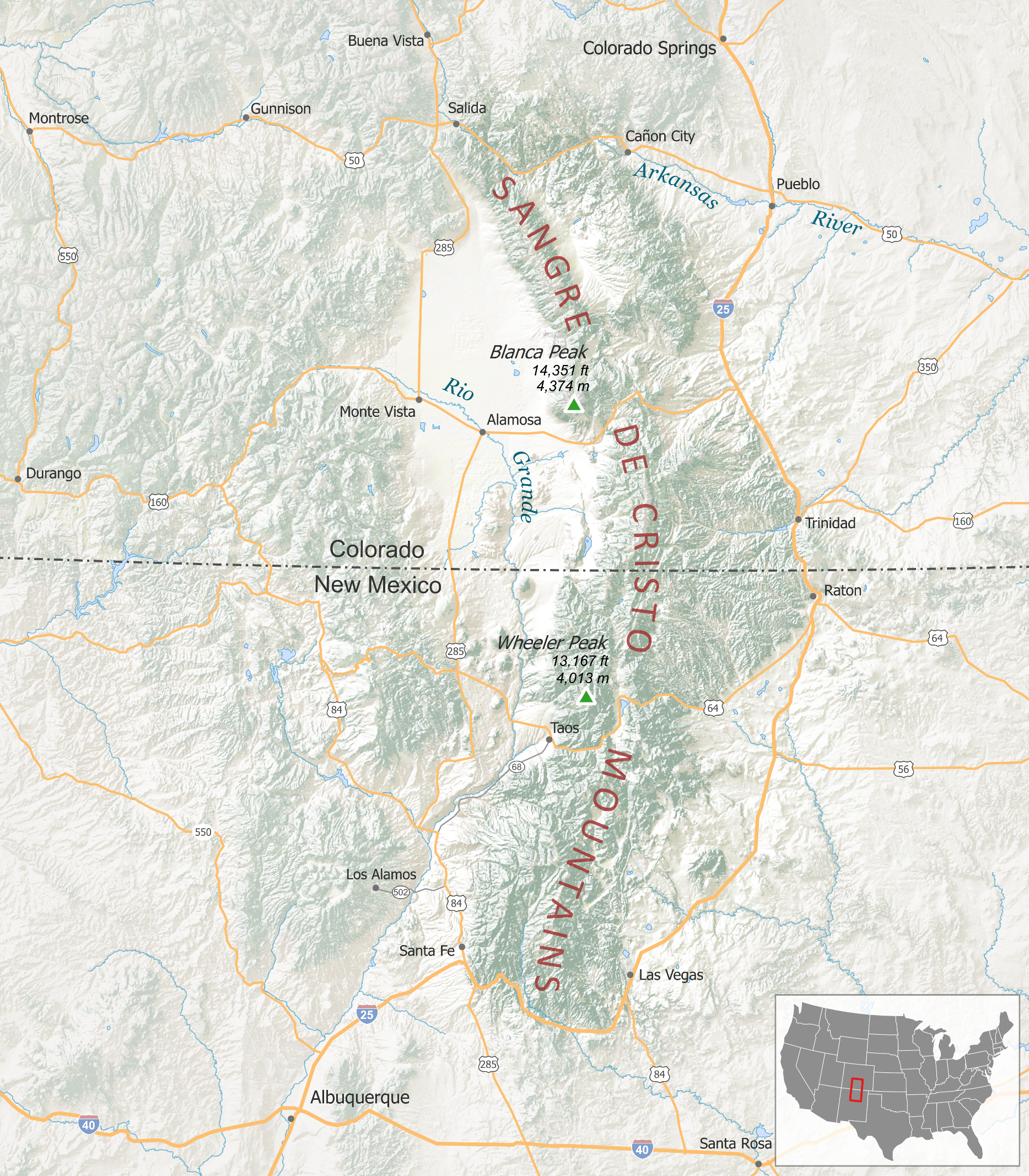
Sangre de Cristo Mountain Range

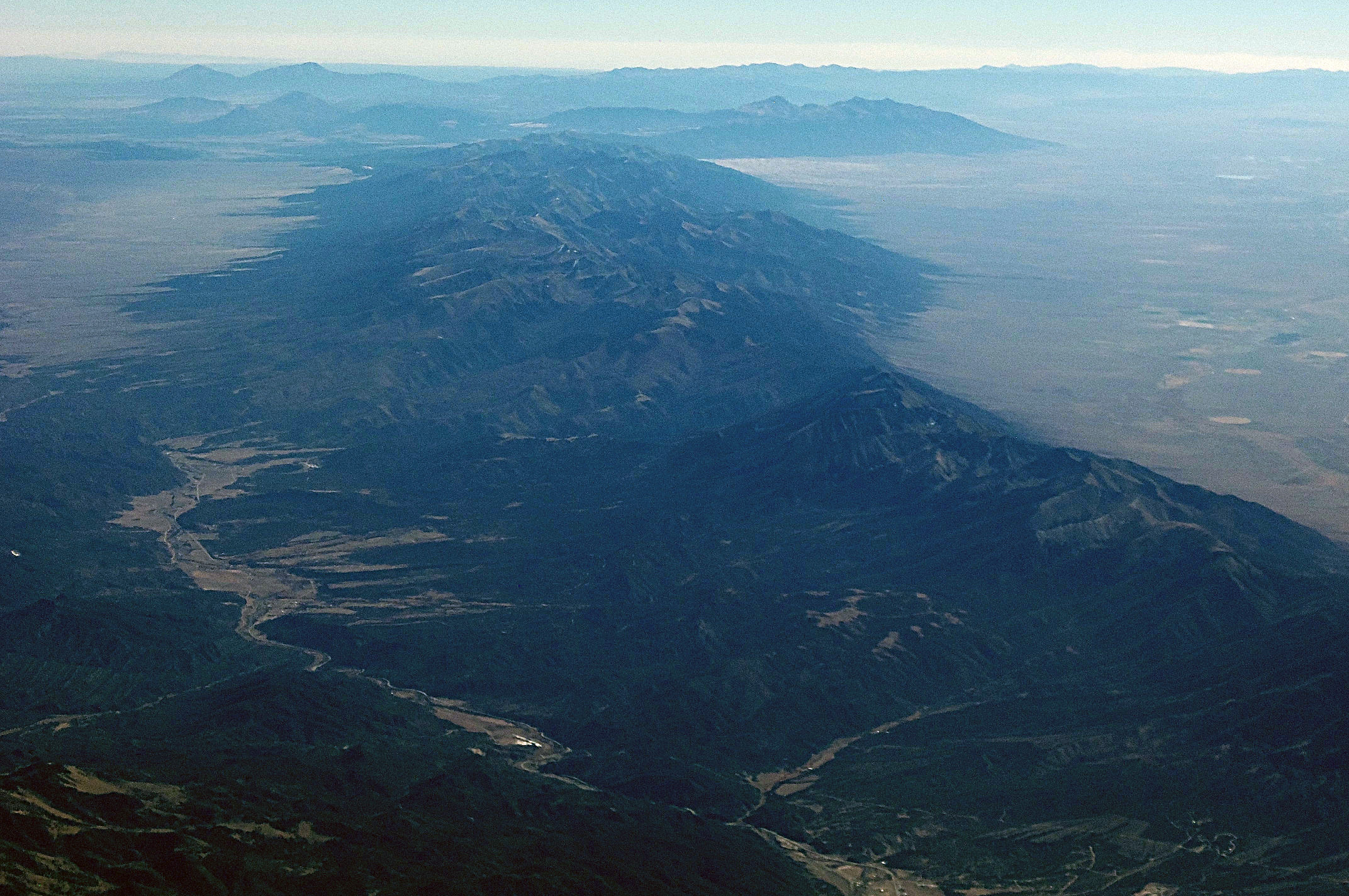
Oblique air photo of northern Sangre de Cristo Range, looking south with Great Sand Dunes near central horizon

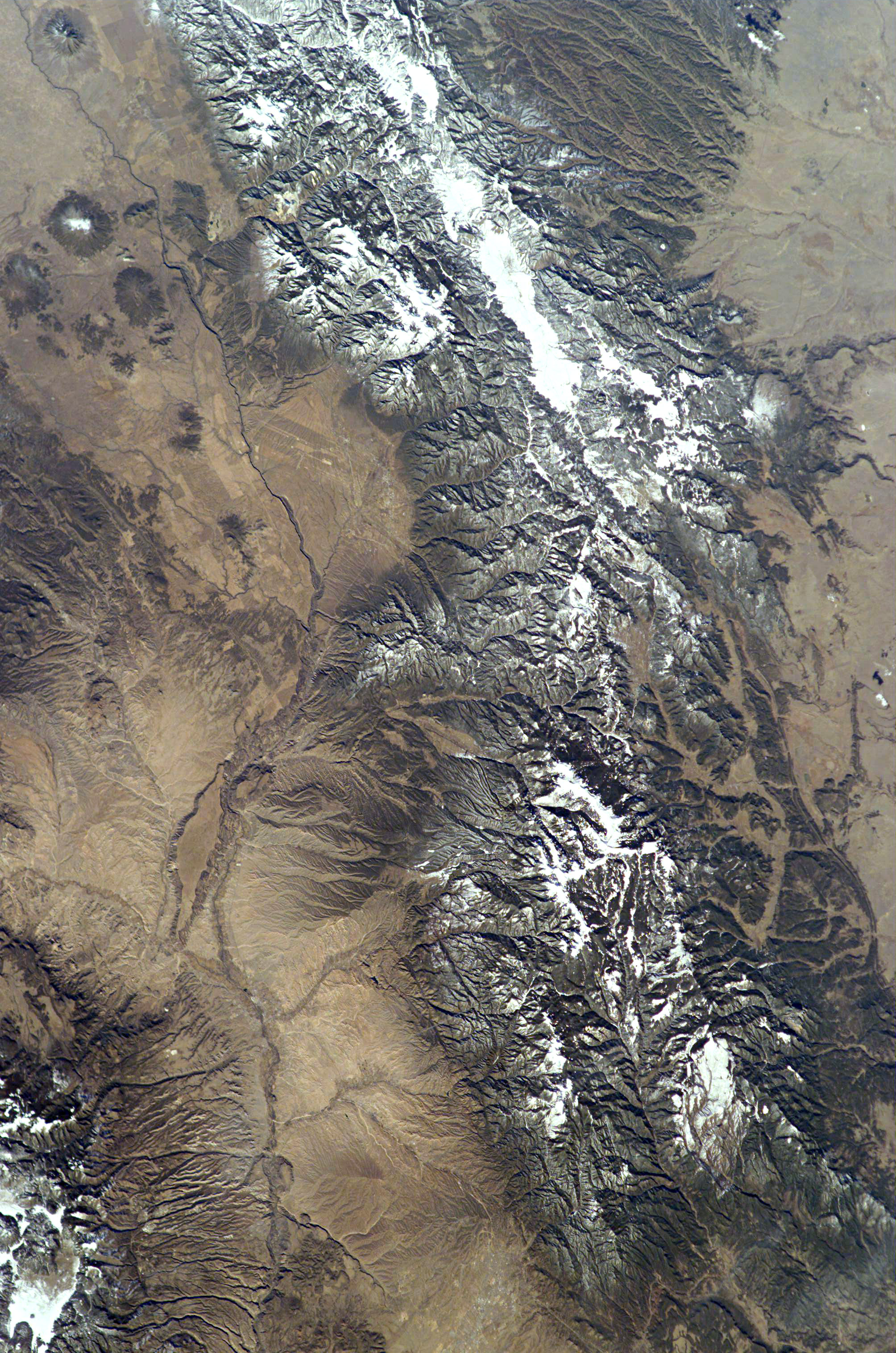
February 2003 astronaut photography of the Sangre de Cristo Mountains from Santa Fe (bottom center) to north of Taos, taken from the International Space Station. Santa Fe Baldy peak at lower right. Valley of the Rio Grande, including the Rio Grande Gorge, west of the mountains.

Much of the mountains are within various National Forests: the Rio Grande and San Isabel in Colorado, and the Carson and Santa Fe in New Mexico. These publicly accessible areas are managed by the United States Forest Service and are popular for hunting, camping, hiking, mountain biking, backpacking, climbing, and cross-country and downhill skiing.

The mountains include two large wilderness areas, the Sangre de Cristo Wilderness in Colorado and the Pecos Wilderness in New Mexico, as well as some smaller wilderness areas, such as Latir Peak Wilderness. The Great Sand Dunes National Park and Preserve lies on the southwest side of the mountains in Colorado and are managed by the National Park Service.

== Subranges ==
The Sangre de Cristo Mountains are divided into various subranges, described here from north to south. Use of the terms "Sangre de Cristo Range" and "Sangre de Cristo Mountains" is inconsistent and may refer to the northernmost subrange, the southernmost subrange, or the mountains as a whole.

=== Sangre de Cristo Range ===
The Sangre de Cristo Range, the largest and most northerly subrange of the Sangre de Cristo Mountains, runs directly along the east side of the Rio Grande rift, extending southeast from Poncha Pass for about 75 miles (120 km) through south-central Colorado to La Veta Pass, approximately 20 miles (32 km) west of Walsenburg. They form a high ridge separating the San Luis Valley on the west from the watershed of the Arkansas River on the east.

=== Crestones ===
The Crestones are a group of four 14,000 feet (4,000 m)+ peaks (fourteeners) in the Sangre de Cristo Range above Crestone, Colorado.

=== Spanish Peaks ===
The Spanish Peaks are a pair of mountains, West Spanish Peak, 13,626 ft (4,153 m), and East Spanish Peak, 12,860 ft (3,920 m), located in southwestern Huerfano County, Colorado. The Spanish Peaks were designated a National Natural Landmark in 1976 as one of the best known examples of igneous dikes. The mountains can be seen from as far as 133 mi (214 km) to the north from Colorado Springs, 65 mi (105 km) to the south from Raton, New Mexico, and 85 mi (137 km) to the east from La Junta, Colorado.

=== Culebra Range ===
The Culebra Range runs almost due north and south, with its northern limit at La Veta Pass in Colorado, and its southern limit at Costilla Creek, just south of Big Costilla Peak in New Mexico. Its highest point is Culebra Peak at 14,047 ft (4,282 m), which is notable for being the only fourteener in Colorado on private land with an access fee. Climbers wishing to ascend Culebra must pay a fee (currently US$150 per person), and the number of climbers per year is limited. It is also the most southerly fourteener in the U.S. Rockies. Standing to the east of the main crest are the two prominent Spanish Peaks (West: 13,626 ft (4,153 m), East: 12,860 ft (3,920 m)). These peaks were important landmarks for 19th century travelers on the mountain branch of the Santa Fe Trail.

The western slope of the Culebras and the San Luis Valley are located within the Sangre de Cristo Land Grant, dating back to the 1840s but still a factor in the pattern of land ownership within the grant. The San Luis Valley is arid. The town of San Luis, Colorado has an annual precipitation of only 9.6 inches (240 mm).The surrounding area, traversed by Culebra Creek, has a rich agricultural history and has been the scene of land disputes between the descendants of Hispanic settlers and Anglo ranchers since the 1860s.

=== Taos Mountains ===
The Taos Mountains span the western lobe of the range from Costilla Creek in the north, to Tres Ritos in the south. (Note: Some sources only include the region north of Palo Flechado Pass in the Taos Mountains; however they do not give a specific subrange name to the entire southern portion. See for example the 1:250,000 scale USGS maps.) They include the highest point in New Mexico, Wheeler Peak, at 13,161 feet (4,011 m), which is part of the Wheeler Peak Wilderness. Other notable peaks include Pueblo Peak, which at 12,305 feet (3,751 m) rises dramatically above Taos Pueblo, and Latir Peak, at 12,708 feet (3,873 m). Williams Lake is located below Wheeler Peak in the Wheeler Peak Wilderness.

Taos Ski Valley lies just to the west of Wheeler Peak. Much of the central portion of the Taos Mountains is on Taos Pueblo land. As viewed from Taos, they are locally called "Taos Mountain".

The southern portion of the Taos Mountains, between Palo Flechado Pass and Tres Ritos (U.S. Route 64 and NM Route 518), is lower and less dramatic than the northern section, with its high point being Cerro Vista, 11,939 ft (3,639 m). The Fernando Mountains are a small subrange lying in this section, just south of US Route 64.

=== Cimarron Range ===
The Cimarron Range lies across the Moreno Valley to the east of the Taos Mountains. It is a lower range, with its highest point being Baldy Mountain at 12,441 ft (3,792 m). The Philmont Scout Ranch lies on the east side of the Cimarron Range.

=== Rincon Mountains ===
This is a minor subrange, significantly lower than the rest of the Sangre de Cristos; it lies east of the southernmost portion of the Taos Mountains.

=== Santa Fe Mountains ===
Rounding out the Sangre de Cristo Mountains are the Santa Fe Mountains, which include all peaks south of NM Route 518. This group lies near Santa Fe and surrounds the Pecos Wilderness, which protects the source watershed of the Pecos River. The peaks include Truchas Peak, 13,102 ft (3,993 m), as their highest point. Other notable peaks are Santa Fe Baldy (12,622 ft (3,847 m)) and Jicarita Peak (12,835 ft (3,912 m)). The Pecos Wilderness is crossed by many trails and is popular for backpacking and for fishing in its high alpine lakes.

== Prominent peaks ==
Peaks
Rank	Mountain Peak	Subrange	Elevation	Prominence	Isolation	Image	Comment
1	Blanca Peak	Sierra Blanca	14,351 ft 4374 m	5,326 ft 1623 m	103.4 mi 166.4 km		Blanca Peak in Colorado is the highest peak of the Sangre de Cristo mountains.
2	Crestone Peak	Crestones	14,300 ft 4359 m	4,554 ft 1388 m	27.4 mi 44.1 km		Crestone Peak is rock scrambles (Class 3) with some exposure and significant rockfall danger. (Image: Crestone Peak and Crestone Needle seen from the south)
3	Culebra Peak	Culebra Range	14,053 ft 4283 m	4,827 ft 1471 m	35.5 mi 57.1 km		(Image: Big Costilla Peak in the Culebra Range, viewed from Valle Vidal.)
4	West Spanish Peak	Spanish Peaks	13,631 ft 4155 m	3,685 ft 1123 m	20.4 mi 32.9 km		(Image: West Spanish Peak taken from the south)
5	Mount Herard	Sangre de Cristo Range	13,325 ft 4062 m	2,040 ft 622 m	4.64 mi 7.47 km		(Image: Sangre de Cristo range from the Great Sand Dunes National Park)
6	Wheeler Peak (Note: The summit of Wheeler Peak is the highest point of New Mexico.)	Taos Mountains	13,167 ft 4013 m	3,409 ft 1039 m	37.4 mi 60.1 km		Wheeler Peak, of the Wheeler Peak Wilderness, is the highest peak in New Mexico. Taos Ski Valley lies just to the west of Wheeler Peak. Much of the central portion of the Taos Mountains are on Taos Pueblo land. As viewed from Taos, they are locally called "Taos Mountain".
7	Bushnell Peak	Sangre de Cristo Range	13,111 ft 3996 m	2,405 ft 733 m	11.07 mi 17.82 km		
8	Truchas Peak	Santa Fe Mountains	13,107 ft 3995 m	4,001 ft 1220 m	42.4 mi 68.2 km		Truchas Peak is the highest point in the Santa Fe Mountains. (Image: Truchas Peak in winter from Española, New Mexico)
9	Venado Peak	Taos Mountains	12,739 ft 3883 m	2,954 ft 900 m	11.8 mi 18.99 km		(Image: Taos Mountain at sunset.)
10	East Spanish Peak	Spanish Peaks	12,688 ft 3867 m	2,383 ft 726 m	4.21 mi 6.78 km		East Spanish Peak is the lower of the two Spanish Peaks, two large igneous stocks which form an eastern outlier of the Culebra Range, a subrange of the Sangre de Cristo Mountains. (Image: Spanish Peaks as seen from I25, Huerfano county, Colorado)
11	Santa Fe Baldy	Santa Fe Mountains	12,632 ft 3850 m	2,002 ft 610 m	10.99 mi 17.69 km		Santa Fe Baldy is a prominent summit in the Sangre de Cristo Mountains of New Mexico, located 15 mi (24 km) northeast of Santa Fe. It is prominent as seen from Los Alamos and communities along the Rio Grande in northern New Mexico, but is relatively inconspicuous from Santa Fe, as its north-south trending main ridge line is seen nearly end-on, disguising the size of the mountain. Santa Fe Baldy lies in the Pecos Wilderness within the Santa Fe National Forest, on the water divide between the Rio Grande and the Pecos River.
12	Baldy Mountain	Cimarron Range	12,445 ft 3793 m	2,701 ft 823 m	11.33 mi 18.24 km		(Image: Baldy Peak summit ridge in the Cimarron Range.)
13	Greenhorn Mountain	Wet Mountains	12,352 ft 3765 m	3,777 ft 1151 m	26.4 mi 42.5 km		Greenhorn Mountain is the highest point in the Wet Mountains of southern Colorado, just high enough to pass tree line which is about 11,500 feet (3,500 m) in this part of Colorado. The massive mountain can be seen from Pueblo and all along Interstate 25. The mountain is protected within the secluded Greenhorn Mountain Wilderness Area but is accessed by a few trails and a nearby 4-wheel drive road to the north.
14	Mount Zwischen	Sangre de Cristo Range	12,011 ft 3661 m	2,266 ft 691 m	4.54 mi 7.31 km		(Image:Mount Zwischen, east aspect)
15	Cerro Vista	Cerro Vista	11,944 ft 3640 m	2,519 ft 768 m	14.19 mi 22.8 km		
16	Mount Phillips	Cimarron Range	11,745 ft 3580 m	2,921 ft 890 m	7.51 mi 12.09 km		Mount Phillips, formerly called Clear Creek Mountain, is located in Colfax County about 11 mi (17 km) south of Baldy Mountain in the Cimarron Range, a subrange of the Sangre de Cristo Mountains of New Mexico. The peak was renamed in 1960 in honor of Waite Phillips, who donated the area to the Boy Scouts of America. (Image: Mount Phillips (tallest mountain, at center) seen from Baldy Mountain)
17	Mount Mestas	Sierra Blanca	11,574 ft 3528 m	2,229 ft 679 m	16.33 mi 26.3 km		
18	Iron Mountain	Sierra Blanca	11,416 ft 3480 m	1,951 ft 595 m	6.95 mi 11.18 km		

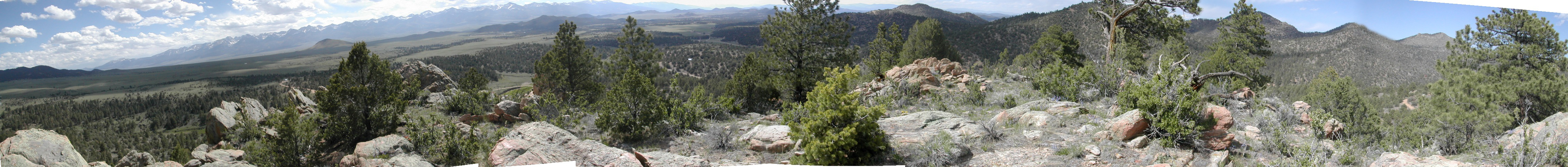
Panoramic summer view of the northern Sangre de Cristo Mountains from Westcliffe, Colorado

== Geology ==
The Sangre de Cristo Mountains were uplifted during the Cenozoic Laramide orogeny. They are bounded on the west by the Rio Grande rift and on the east by a series of reverse and thrust faults. Vertical displacement along the faults is at least 4,200 metres (13,800 ft), and gravity measurements suggest the uplift has been thrust eastward great distances. This faulting places Precambrian basement rock in contact with sedimentary strata along the eastern margin of the uplift except where igneous rocks have been intruded along the fault.

== See also ==
- Glorieta Pass
- Southern Rocky Mountains
- Valle Vidal
- Vietnam Veterans Memorial State Park
