= Wheeler Peak Wilderness =

Protected area of New Mexico, US

Wheeler Peak Wilderness (Forest Service)
- IUCN category Ib (wilderness area)
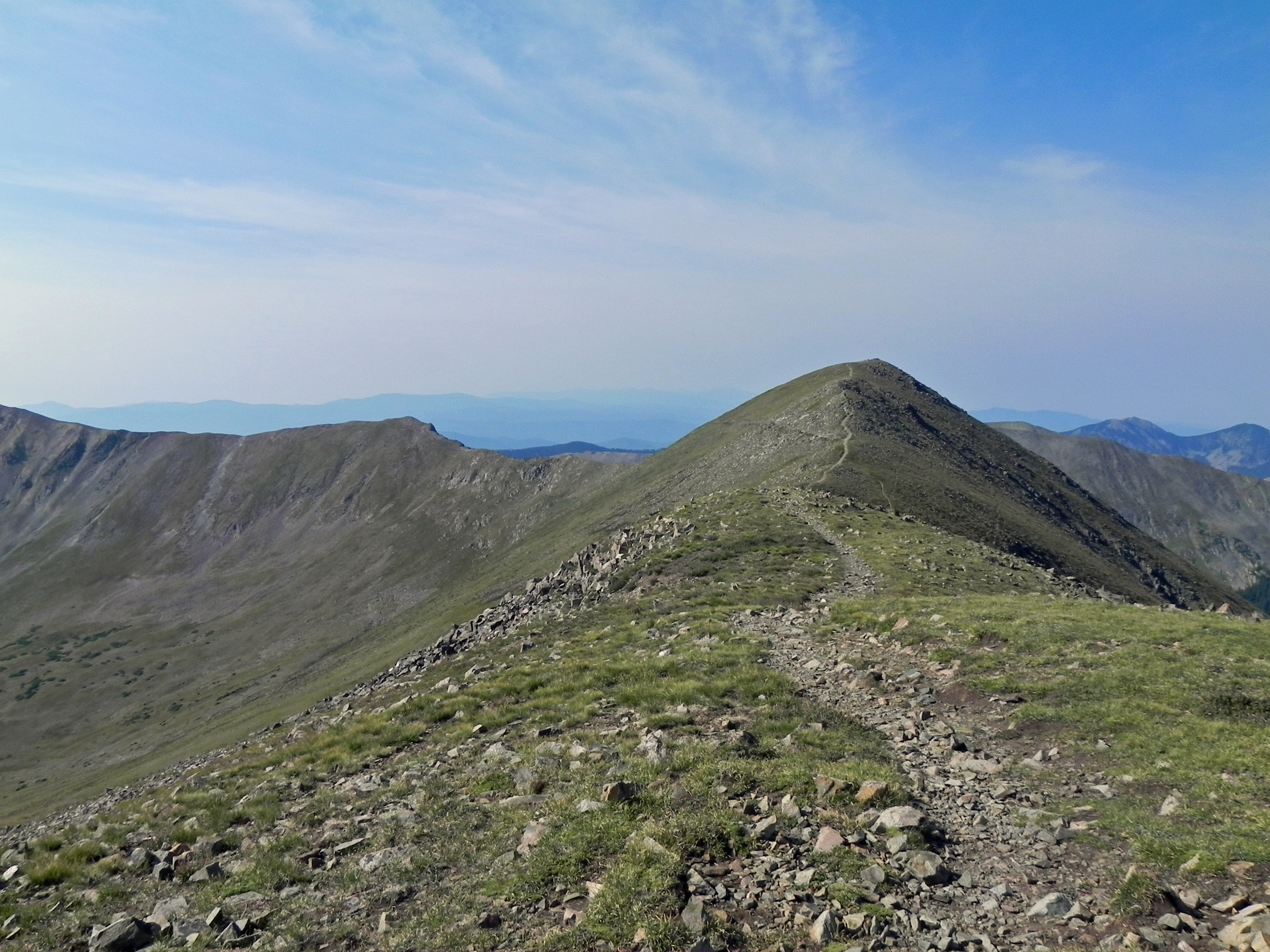

- Location within New Mexico
- Location: Taos County, New Mexico, New Mexico, United States
- Coordinates: 36°35′2″N 105°25′26″W
- Area: 19,661 acres (79.57 km^{2})
- Established: 1964

The 19,661-acre (7,957 ha) Wheeler Peak Wilderness lies in the Carson National Forest of New Mexico. It contains the highest point in the state, 13,161-foot (4,011 m) Wheeler Peak as well as Williams Lake.

== History ==
Established as the Wheeler Peak Wild Area in 1960, 6,051 acres (2,449 ha) the area was re-designated the Wheeler Peak Wilderness in 1964 with the passage of the Wilderness Act. The area was expanded by 14,700 acres (5,900 ha) in 1980 with the passage of the New Mexico Wilderness Act. In 1996, public law 104-333 transferred 764 acres (309 ha) from the wilderness south of the ridge between Simpson Peak and Old Mike Peak and west of Blue Lake to the nearby Taos Pueblo.

== Flora and fauna ==
The Wheeler Peak Wilderness is home to a variety of birds and mammals. Marmots, pikas, bighorn sheep, and golden eagles are year-round residents. Rocky Mountain elk, mule deer dwell in the area during the summer season, feeding on grasses and new aspen growth in the higher elevations. Although bighorn sheep are native to the area, the local population was re-introduced to the area in 1993. Other local avian fauna include many common rocky mountain species such magpies, Canada jays, chickadees and woodpeckers.

Many rivers and alpine lakes within the Wheeler Peak wilderness are stocked with cutthroat and/or rainbow trout every few years by the New Mexico Department of Game and Fish.

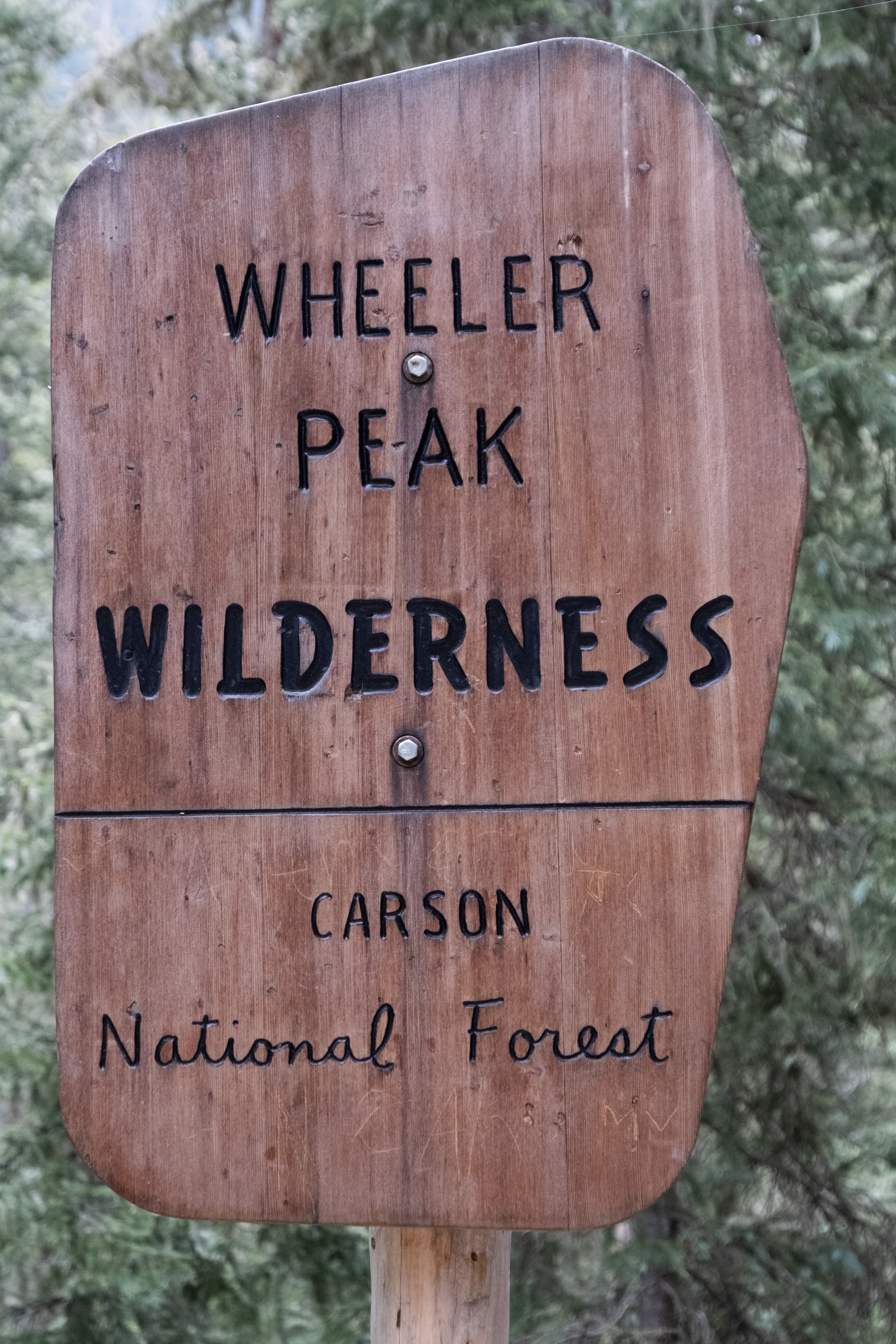
The boundary marker of the Wheeler Peak Wilderness.

Flora of the Wheeler Peak Wilderness vary by altitude, and include cottonwoods, Bristlecone pines, Engelmann spruce and sub-alpine fir and many species of wildflower.

== See also ==
- List of U.S. Wilderness Areas
- Wilderness Act
