= List of Bureau of Land Management Back Country Byways =

Bureau of Land Management Back Country Byways
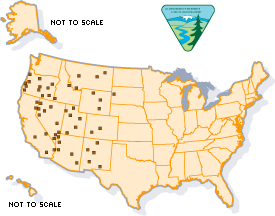
- Back Country Byways highlighted with brown squares

System information
- Length: 2,952 mi (4,751 km)
- Formed: 1989

Highway names
- Interstates: Interstate nn (I-nn)
- US Highways: US Highway nn, US Route nn (US nn)
- State: Varies by state

System links
- Scenic Byways; National; National Forest; BLM; NPS

The Bureau of Land Management Back Country Byways are roads that have been designated by the Bureau of Land Management as scenic byways. Some are also National Scenic Byways or National Forest Scenic Byways. The program was initiated in 1989 and 54 byways have since been designated in the Western United States. Each byway is classified Type I-IV based on the vehicles that can traverse it.

- Type I—Roads are paved or have an all weather surface and have grades that are negotiable by a normal touring car. These roads are usually narrow, slow speed, secondary roads.
- Type II—Roads require high-clearance vehicles such as trucks or 4-wheel drives. These roads are usually not paved, but may have some type of surfacing. Grades, curves, and road surface are such that they can be negotiated with a 2-wheel drive high clearance vehicle without undue difficulty.
- Type III— Roads require 4-wheel drive vehicles or other specialized vehicles such as dirt bikes, all-terrain vehicles (ATVs), etc. These roads are usually not surfaced, but are managed to provide for safety considerations and resource protection needs. They have grades, tread surfaces, and other characteristics that will require specialized vehicles to negotiate.
- Type IV—Trails that are managed specifically to accommodate dirt bike, mountain bike, snowmobile, or ATV use. These are usually single track trails.

== List ==
Type	Name	Length (mi)	Length (km)	State(s)	Southern or western terminus	Northern or eastern terminus	Description	Ref(s).
III	Alpine Loop National Back Country Byway	63	101	Colorado	US 550 in Ouray or Silverton	SH 149 in Lake City	This route winds its way to an elevation of 12,800 feet (3,900 m), crossing Engineer and Cinnamon passes. The rugged scenery includes river meadows, alpine tundra, ghost towns, and ore mills.	
II	Barrel Springs Back Country Byway	93	150	California, Nevada	SR 299 in Cedarville	Loops through Washoe County and returns to Cedarville	This route in the Tricorner Region of California and Nevada travels through rugged terrain perfect for wildlife viewing. Following portions of the California Trail, historical buildings and evidence of emigrant life remain along the route, testifying of early settlers' trials on the frontier.	
I	Big Sheep Creek Back Country Byway	51	82	Montana	Big Sheep Creek Road and I-15 near Dell	Medicine Lodge Road and MT S-324 near Grant	An isolated route through the canyons and valleys of the Tendoy Mountains of southwestern Montana. The road is mostly two-lane gravel, and provides many opportunities for viewing bighorns, elk, and trout.	
I	Big Sky Back Country Byway	105	169	Montana	Old Highway 10 in Terry	US 2 and MT 13 near Wolf Point	Crossing a variety of different landscapes, including the Terry Badlands, the byway follows much of the Regina-Yellowstone Trail, once used as the principal route from Canada to Yellowstone National Park.	
II	Bitter Springs Back Country Byway	28	45	Nevada	Northshore Road in Lake Mead NRA	Valley of Fire Road near Crystal	Traverses the scrubland desert of the Muddy Mountains and Bitter Spring Valley, passing colorful and unique sandstone formations.	
II	Black Hills Back Country Byway	21	34	Arizona	US 191 east of Safford	US 191 in Clifton	Primitive route through the Black Hills, offering opportunities for camping, hiking, mountain biking, off-roading, horseback riding, and rock collecting.	
III	Bradshaw Trail	75	121	California	Summit and Gas Line Roads near Coachella Canal	SR 78 south of Blythe	Historic overland stage route connecting the Arizona gold fields to Southern California. Passes through the Chuckwalla, Orocopia, and Mule mountains.	
II	Buckhorn Back Country Byway	27	43	California, Nevada	US 395 in Ravendale	Washoe County Route 447 north of Gerlach	Route showcases unique flora, fauna, and geology of the southern Modoc Plateau, including Ponderosa Pine, migratory waterfowl, wild burros, and sand dunes.	
III	Bull Creek Pass National Back Country Byway	68	109	Utah	Trachyte Ranch Road and SR 276 northeast of Mount Hillers	Lone Cedar Road and SR 95 east of Bull Mountain	Remote and rugged route through the Henry Mountains, one of the last-surveyed areas of the contiguous United States.	
I	California Trail Back Country Byway	96	154	Nevada	CR 761 and US 93 near Jackpot; CR 765 and US 93 near Wilkins	CR 762 near the Utah border	Follows sections of the California National Historic Trail, an overland pioneer route used by western settlers and emigrants in the 19th century. Features include historic ruins, wagon wheel ruts, natural springs, and outdoor recreation opportunities.	
II	Chain of Craters Back Country Byway	36	58	New Mexico	CR 42 and NM 117	CR 42 and NM 53	This byway follows Cibola County Road 42, showcasing the cinder cones and lava fields of the Chain of Craters in El Malpais National Monument. The route also provides access to the Continental Divide Trail.	
-	Chimney Peak Back Country Byway	0	0	California	-	-	Remote route through the sagebrush-pinyon desert of the Chimney Peak Wilderness. Riparian habitats provide for wildlife viewing and seasonal wildflowers. Former Type II byway; date of de-designation unknown.	
I/II	Christmas Valley Back Country Byway	93	150	Oregon	Old Lake Rd and OR 31 in Silver Lake; CR5-10 and OR 31 in Fort Rock	BLM Road 6151	Loop through the high desert sand dunes and lava fields of central Oregon. Natural sites include Fort Rock, the Fossil Lake playa, Crack in the Ground, and the Lost Forest.	
I	Cow Creek Back Country Byway	45	72	Oregon	I-5 exit 80 in Glendale	I-5 exit 103 in Myrtle Creek	Rustic and historic route following Cow Creek through the Oregon Coast Range, featuring farms and ranches, forests, and numerous sites detailing the history of gold mining in Oregon. Also an Oregon State Scenic Byway.	
I	Diamond Loop Back Country Byway	69	111	Oregon	Diamond Lane and OR 205 in Diamond	Lava Bed Road and OR 78 in Princeton	Route passes through desert and marshland, featuring migratory fowl and wild horses around Malheur National Wildlife Refuge, the volcanic landscapes of the Diamond Craters, and the Pete French Round Barn, a relic of Oregon's ranching history.	
II	Fort Churchill to Wellington Back Country Byway	67	108	Nevada	SR 208 and SR 289 in Wellington	Fort Churchill State Historic Park	Fort Churchill was built in order to protect the Pony Express riders and settlers against the natives in the area.	
I	Galice to Hellgate Back Country Byway	40	64	Oregon	National Forest boundary west of Merlin	Merlin Road and I-5 in Grants Pass	Scenic route through the deep river canyon of the Rogue River. Features opportunities for rafting and fishing in and around Rogue River–Siskiyou National Forest and the Rouge River National Recreation Trail.	
IV	Garnet Back Country Byway	12	19	Montana	Garnet Ridge Road and MT 200 near Potomac	Elk Creek Service Road	Travels through mountainous wilderness to the Garnet and Coloma ghost towns. Recreation opportunities include, cross-country skiing, snowshoeing, horseback riding, hiking, snowmobiling, and camping.	
III	Gold Belt Tour Scenic and Historic Byway	131	211	Colorado	CO 115 in Florence	US 24 in Florissant	Follows historic railroad and stagecoach routes leading to high mountain gold camps, fossil sites, and numerous historic sites. The Shelf and Phantom Canyon Roads cut along unpaved routes through winding canyons. Also a National Scenic Byway and a Colorado Scenic and Historic Byway.	
II	Gold Butte Back Country Byway	62	100	Nevada	Red Bluff Springs and Mud Wash roads	I-15 and SR 170 near Riverside	Traverses a remote and rugged section of the Virgin Mountains near Lake Mead. As part of Gold Butte National Monument, the byway provides access to the ghost town of Gold Butte, Little Finland rock formations, petroglyph sites, wildlife habitats, and wilderness areas.	
I	Grave Creek to Marial Back Country Byway	33	53	Oregon	Forest Road 1160 near Illahe	Grave Creek and Galice Roads near Galice	Route through the Rogue River Canyon in the Siskiyou Mountains.	
I	Guadalupe Back Country Byway	30	48	New Mexico	NM 137 near Carlsbad Caverns National Park	NM 137 and US 285 near Carlsbad	This backway crosses portions of the Chihuahuan Desert, the Guadalupe Escarpment, and Lincoln National Forest in southern New Mexico. Starting near Brantley Lake State Park and proceeding southwest to Sitting Bull Falls, this route is also a State Scenic Backway.	
III	Harquahala Mountain Back Country Byway	11	18	Arizona	Eagle Eye Road near Sunwest	Harquahala Peak	The byway runs adjacent to the Harquahala Mountains Wilderness and contains a wide variety of desert flora and fauna across varied elevations and ecosystems. Historic structures such as stone houses, mines, and the Harquahala Peak Observatory adorn the route.	
I	Lake Valley Back Country Byway	48	77	New Mexico	NM 27 and NM 26 near Nutt	NM 152 and I-25 near Hillsboro	This backway is between the Mimbres and Caballo mountains and the Cookes Range in southwestern New Mexico. Passes through ranching land and features the ghost town of Lake Valley. Also a State Scenic Byway.	
I/II	Lakeview to Steens Mountain Back Country Byway	90	140	Oregon	OR 78 and Lava Bed Road in New Princeton	US 395 and OR 140 near Lakeview	Explores the Warner Valley and Mountains of the high desert of southeast Oregon. The National Antelope Refuge, Hart Mountain, and valley marshes provide opportunities for recreation and wildlife viewing.	
I	Lewis and Clark Back Country Byway	36	58	Idaho	ID 28 in Tendoy	Loops through Lemhi Pass and returns to Tendoy	Route explores the high Rockies along the Continental Divide Trail and Lewis and Clark National Historic Trail of eastern Idaho. Passing through Salmon-Challis National Forest, the area is largely unchanged since the Corps of Discovery's 1805 expedition.	
I	Los Caminos Antiguos	129	208	Colorado	US 285 in Alamosa	CO 17 at the New Mexico state line	Traverses the San Luis Valley, passing Colorado's oldest community, the Great Sand Dunes, and the Sangre de Cristo Range. Also a Colorado Scenic and Historic Byway	
I/II	Lovelock Cave Back Country Byway	20	32	Nevada	Lovelock Cave	Meridian Road and SR 397 in Lovelock	Route travels through a playa of the former Lake Lahontan towards Lovelock Cave. Having yielded numerous 2,000-year-old artifacts, the cave is one of the Great Basin's most important archaeological sites.	
I	Lower Crooked River Back Country Byway	43	69	Oregon	US 20 and OR 27 near Millican	US 26 and OR 27 in Prineville	Route traverses through hilly sections of Oregon's high sagebrush desert and the basalt bluffs of the wild and scenic Lower Crooked River canyon.	
I	Lower Deschutes River Back Country Byway	32	51	Oregon	Deschutes River Road near Dant	OR 216 near Grass Valley	Byway follows a former railway bed along the Deschutes River, through the multi-colored walls of a canyon made of Columbia River basalt. This wild and scenic river provides many recreational opportunities, such as rafting, fishing, and wildlife viewing.	
II	Lunar Crater Back Country Byway	24	39	Nevada	US 6, 31 miles (50 km) east of SR 375	Loops through Nye County and returns to US 6	Route loops through the cinder cones and basalt flows of Central Nevada's Lunar Crater volcanic field, including the Easy Chair crater and the Lunar Crater National Natural Landmark.	
I	Main Oregon Trail Back Country Byway	102	164	Idaho	Three Island Crossing State Park in Glenns Ferry	I-84 and Blacks Creek Road near Boise	Route follows the main Oregon Trail from the crossing of the Snake River near Glenns Ferry to Bonneville Point, southeast of Boise.	
II	Missouri Breaks Back Country Byway	80	130	Montana	MT 236 in Winifred	Knox Ridge Road and US 191 near the Fred Robinson Bridge	Route traverses the central Montana badlands along remote portions of the wild and scenic section of the Missouri River.The byway follows portions of the Nez Perce and Lewis and Clark National Historic trails, and passes through the geologically and biologically diverse Upper Missouri River Breaks National Monument.	
II	Mt. Wilson Back Country Byway	66	106	Nevada	US 93 at Pony Springs	US 93 and SR 322 in Pioche	The byways passes through volcanic basins and canyons as it ascends the Wilson Range. Historic mining buildings and cemeteries can be explored among the piñon-juniper forests of the desert, while the higher elevation ponderosa-aspen forests provide opportunities for wildlife viewing.	
I	Nestucca River Back Country Byway	48	77	Oregon	Blaine Road and US 101 in Beaver	Meadowlake Road and OR 47 in Carlton	Byway travels through the wooded canyon of the Nestucca River, an Oregon State Scenic Waterway. The canyon walls are made up of ancient seafloor sandstone and basalt, where abundant rainfall in the Coastal Range's temperate rain forest yields an area of incredibly rich biomass.	
I	Nine Mile Canyon Back Country Byway	78	126	Utah	US 191 and US 6 in Wellington	US 40 and US 191 west of Myton	Ninemile Canyon is known as a major representative area of the prehistoric Fremont culture. The canyon houses a myriad of rock panels along the main road and in side canyons.	
I	Old Route 66 - Oatman Road	42	68	Arizona	Oatman Highway and I-40 near the Colorado River	Downtown Kingman	This desert route follows one of the best preserved sections of the original Historic Route 66, and includes the wild west mining town of Oatman and the challenging Sitgreaves Pass through the Black Mountains.	
I	Owyhee Uplands Back Country Byway	103	166	Idaho, Oregon	Yturri Blvd and US 95 in Jordan Valley, Oregon	ID 78 and ID 167 in Grand View, Idaho	Route traverses the sagebrush steppe and canyons of southwestern Idaho. Unique geological features and high desert wildlife can be found within the North Fork Owyhee, Little Jacks Creek, and Pole Creek Wilderness areas, or the along the Battle Creek, North Fork Owyhee, and Deep Creek wild and scenic rivers.	
I	Parker Dam Road	11	18	California, Arizona	Parker Dam Road at SR 62 in Earp	Parker Dam Road at SR 95 in Parker	Nicknamed the "Thread of Life," this route follows a narrow canyon of the Colorado River between the Whipple and Buckskin mountains, providing recreational opportunities while also highlighting the flora, fauna, and cultural features of a desert oasis.	
II	Pony Express Trail National Back Country Byway	133	214	Utah	Pony Express Road east of Ibapah	Camp Floyd State Park Museum on SR 73 in Fairfield	Byway follows the Central Overland Route, used briefly by the Pony Express, through the basins and desert of western Utah. Ruins of Pony Express stations still exist, with interpretive displays relaying the historical significance of the route. Also an Utah State Backway.	
I	Quartzville Road Back Country Byway	50	80	Oregon	Quartzville Road and US 20 near Foster	Forest Road 11 and OR 22 south of Marion Forks	Route follows the wild and scenic Quartzville Creek through Willamette National Forest in the Oregon Cascades. Natural features include old growth forests, rocky outcroppings, and wildflower meadows, while the creek provides opportunities for fishing, kayakying, and gold panning.	
II	Quebradas Back Country Byway	24	39	New Mexico	US 380 near San Antonio	NM 408 and I-25 in Escondida	Follows County Road A-129 to US 380 along the benchland above the Rio Grande Valley floodplain, passing through two wildlife refuges. Also a State Scenic Backway.	
II	Red Gulch/Alkali National Back Country Byway	32	51	Wyoming	Alkali Road and WY 31 in Hyattville	Red Gulch Road and US 14 near Shell	Route travels through the rugged canyons of the Bighorn Mountains, providing opportunities to hike through the geologically unique Chugwater Formation and to view dinosaur tracks. Also a Wyoming State Scenic Backway	
I	Red Rock Canyon Back Country Byway	13	21	Nevada	SR 159 and Scenic Loop Drive	NV 159 and Visitor Center Road	Red Rock Canyon Back Country Byway runs across a paved loop through the Red Rock Canyon National Conservation Area, passing through varied, colorful rock formations, and providing opportunities for hiking, rock climbing, picknicking, and wildlife viewing.	
II	Saline Valley Road Back Country Byway	100	160	California	Saline Valley Road and SR 190 in Darwin	Death Valley-Big Pine Road and SR 168 in Big Pine	Route travels through the Inyo Mountains and Saline Valley on the west side of Death Valley National Park. Hot springs, salt marshes, and wildlife provide a unique contrast to the otherwise desolate landscape of the Death Valley environs.	
I/II/III	Seminoe to Alcova Scenic Backway	64	103	Wyoming	Carbon County Road 351 and I-80 in Sinclair	Natrona County Road 407 and WY 220 in Alcova	The backway is in a remote area traversing the Seminoe Mountains, the Pedro Mountains, and Fremont Canyon. Deserts, prairies, and area reservoirs provide opportunities for recreation and wildlife viewing. Also a Wyoming State Scenic Backway.	
II	Silver Island Mountains Back Country Byway	54	87	Utah	Loops around Silver Mountains and returns to Wendover	Bonneville Speedway Road and I-80 in Wendover	Located near the Utah-Nevada border, this byway loops through the Silver Island Range and basins in northwest Utah. The route explores portions of the California Trail and Hastings Cutoff. Also a Utah Scenic Backway.	
I	Smithsonian Butte National Back Country Byway	9	14	Utah	Main Street and SR 59 near Apple Valley	Bridge Road and SR 9 in Rockville	Route travels through the Virgin River floodplain, piñon-juniper forests, and sagebrush desert. Provides views of Smithsonian Butte, Eagle Crags, Vermilion Cliffs, and Zion National Park. Also a Utah Scenic Byway.	
I/II	Snake River-Mormon Basin Back Country Byway	150	240	Oregon	OR 86 and I-84 in Baker City	OR 86 between Pine and Oxbow; Snake River Rd and US Bus. 30 in Huntington	Route travels through the geologically varied areas of northeastern Oregon, including canyonlands along the Snake River, timbered mountainsides, wildflower basins, and sagebrush plateaus. Remnants of 19th century settlement include pioneer homesteads, derelict mines, and historic wagon roads.	
II	South Big Horn/Red Wall Scenic Backway	102	164	Wyoming	Natrona County Road 104 and US 20/US 26 near Arminto	Natrona County Road 125 and US 20/US 26 near Casper	Byway traverses the prairies and southern Big Horn Mountains of central Wyoming, with access to the Red Wall, the Hole-in-the-Wall, and Hell's Half Acre. Also a Wyoming State Scenic Backway.	
I	South Fork-Alsea River Back Country Byway	11	18	Oregon	OR 34 and OR 501 in Alsea	Alpine and Bellfountains Roads in Alpine	This byway parallels the South Fork Alsea River in the Oregon Coast Range, and provides numerous recreational opportunities, including mountain biking, camping, wildlife viewing, fishing, and hiking. Wildflowers and orchids underlie the expansive fir and maple forests.	
I	South Fork John Day River Back Country Byway	50	80	Oregon	Grant County Road 68 at Malheur National Forest	South Fork Road and Us 26 in Dayville	This route follows the wild and scenic South Fork John Day River through basalt canyons and conifer forests. Two wilderness areas afford opportunity for hiking and wildlife viewing.	
I/II	Steens Mountain Back Country Byway	52	84	Oregon	OR 205 and Steens Mtn. Loop Rd south of Frenchglen	OR 205 and Steens Mtn. Loop Rd in Frenchglen	This byway loops around Steens Mountain, the highest peak in southeastern Oregon. The diverse geological landscape includes glaciated canyons, lush meadows, and arid desert; the expansive wilderness is home to wild horses, antelope, and eagles.	
I	Sutton Mountain Back Country Byway	41	66	Oregon	OR 207 and US 26 in Mitchell	John Day River Bridge at Twickenham Road in Twickenham	Route loops around the Sutton Mountain wilderness area, passing John Day Fossil Beds National Monument, and follows the John Day River through the Painted Hills of Central Oregon.	
II	Transcontinental Railroad Back Country Byway	90	140	Utah	Pilot Mountain Road in Lucin	Golden Spike Loop Road, west of Promontory	Byway follows original Central Pacific railway grade west of Promontory Summit, the site of the completion of the First transcontinental railroad at Golden Spike National Historic Site. Also a Utah Scenic Byway.	
I	Wild Rivers Back Country Scenic Byway	13	21	New Mexico	La Junta Point in Rio Grande del Norte National Monument	NM 522 and NM 387 in Questa	Follows the Rio Grande Gorge through Rio Grande del Norte National Monument and Wild Rivers Recreation Area in north-central New Mexico; also a State Scenic Byway.	

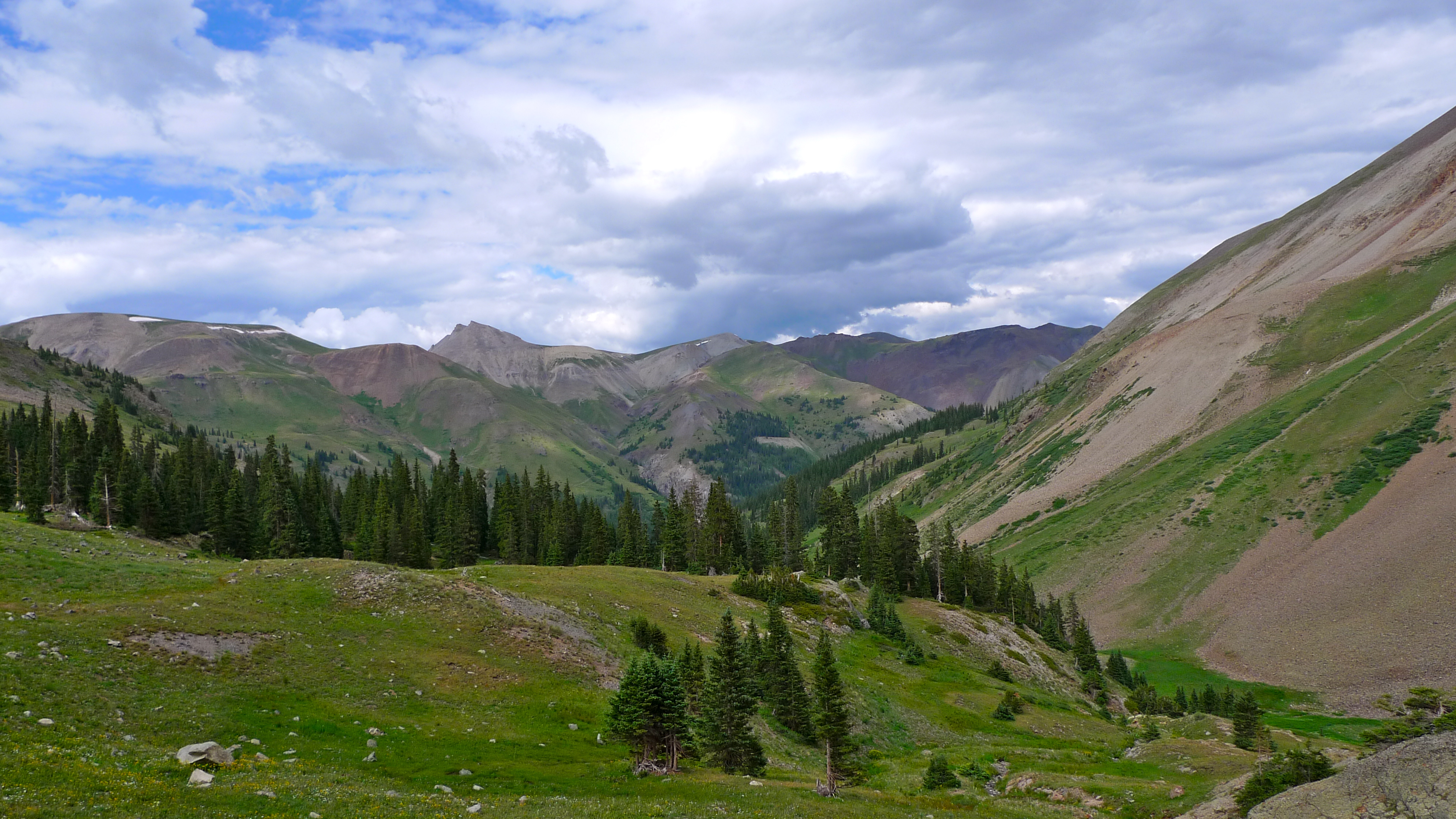

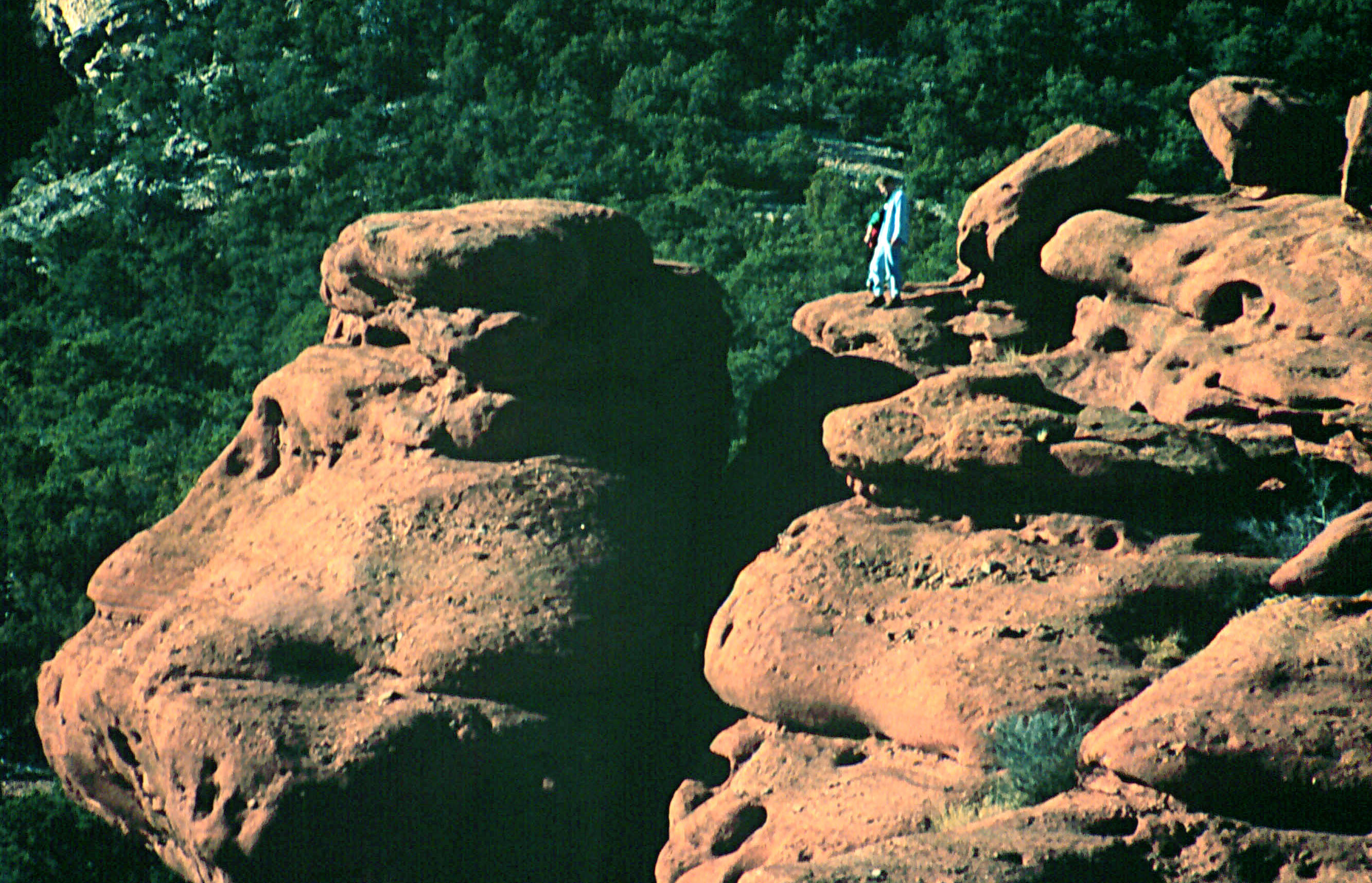

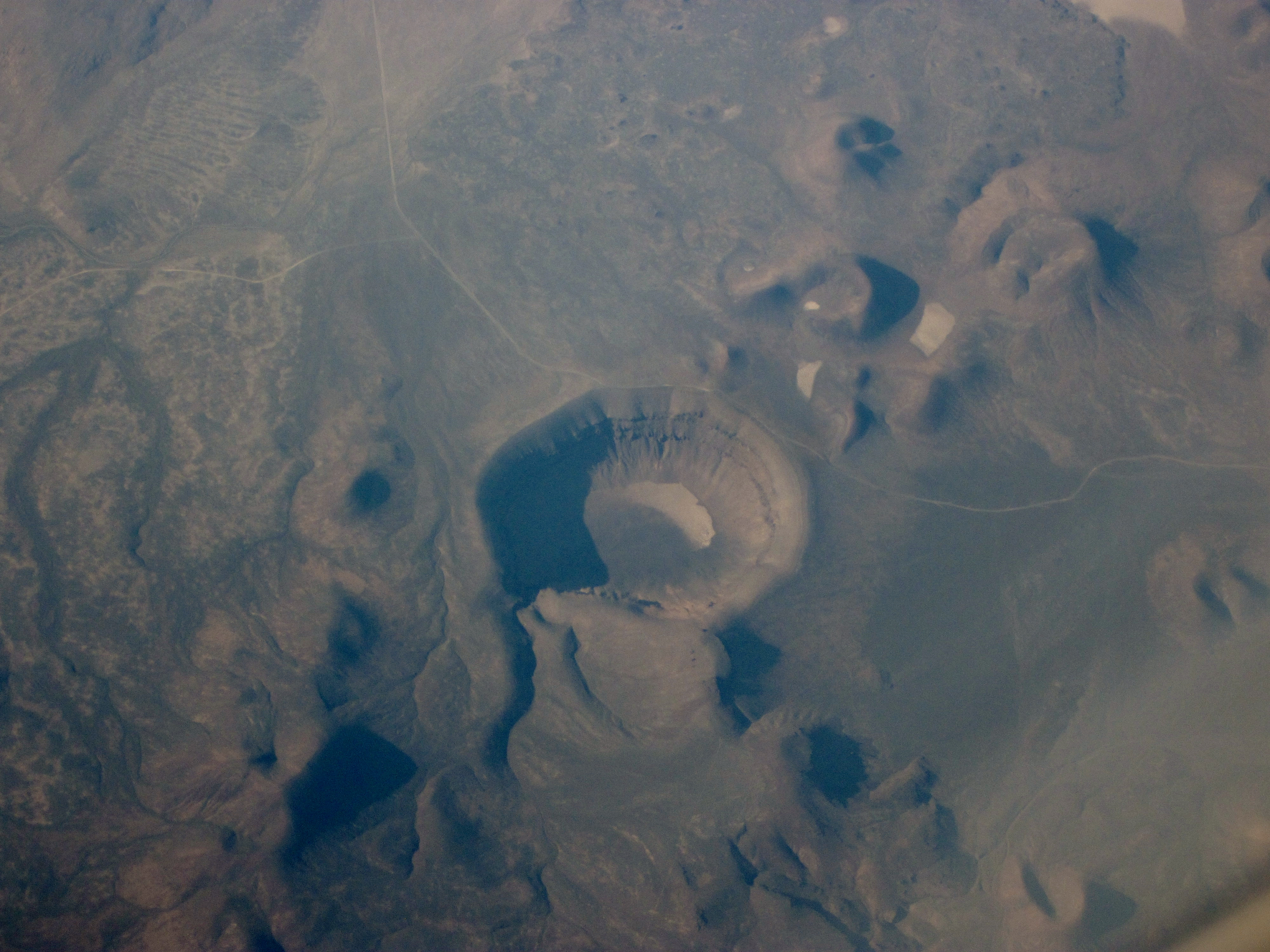

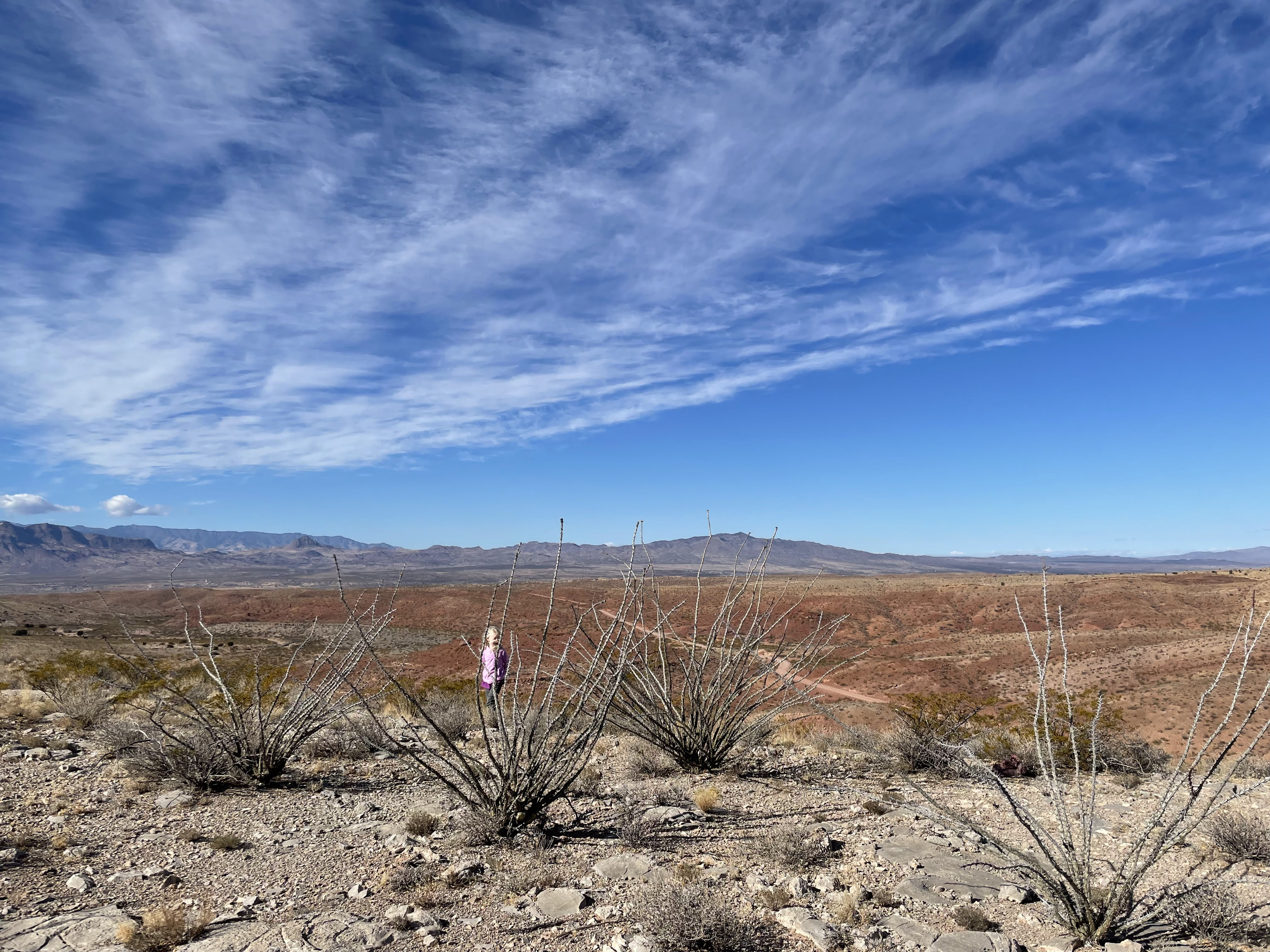
