= Gold Butte (disambiguation) =

Gold Butte is a place name commonly used in Nevada.

Gold Butte may also refer to:

== Places ==
- Gold Butte, a 5,049 ft (1,539 m) mountain peak
- Gold Butte, Nevada, a ghost town
- Gold Butte Mining District
- Gold Butte (Montana), a summit in the Sweet Grass Hills
- Gold Butte National Monument (GBNM), a part of the National Conservation Lands System within the Gold Butte region
- Gold Butte region, a general area bounded by the Virgin River to the west and north, Colorado River to the south, and Colorado Plateau to the east.
- Gold Butte wash, a surface feature

== Film and literature ==
- Armageddon at Gold Butte by Terrell L. Bowers, an American novel
- Judgment at Gold Butte by Terrell L. Bowers, an American novel
- The Prehistory of Gold Butte: A Virgin River Hinterland, Clark County, Nevada by Kelly McGuire, William Hildebrandt, Amy Gilreath and Jerome King, an American non-fiction book

== Geology ==
- Gold Butte Granite, a rock type

== Plants ==
- Gold Butte moss (Didymodon nevadensis), a bryophyte

== Other uses ==
- Friends of Gold Butte, a non-profit organization
