= Little Finland =

Redrock area in Nevada, United States

Coordinates: 36.45°N 114.21°W

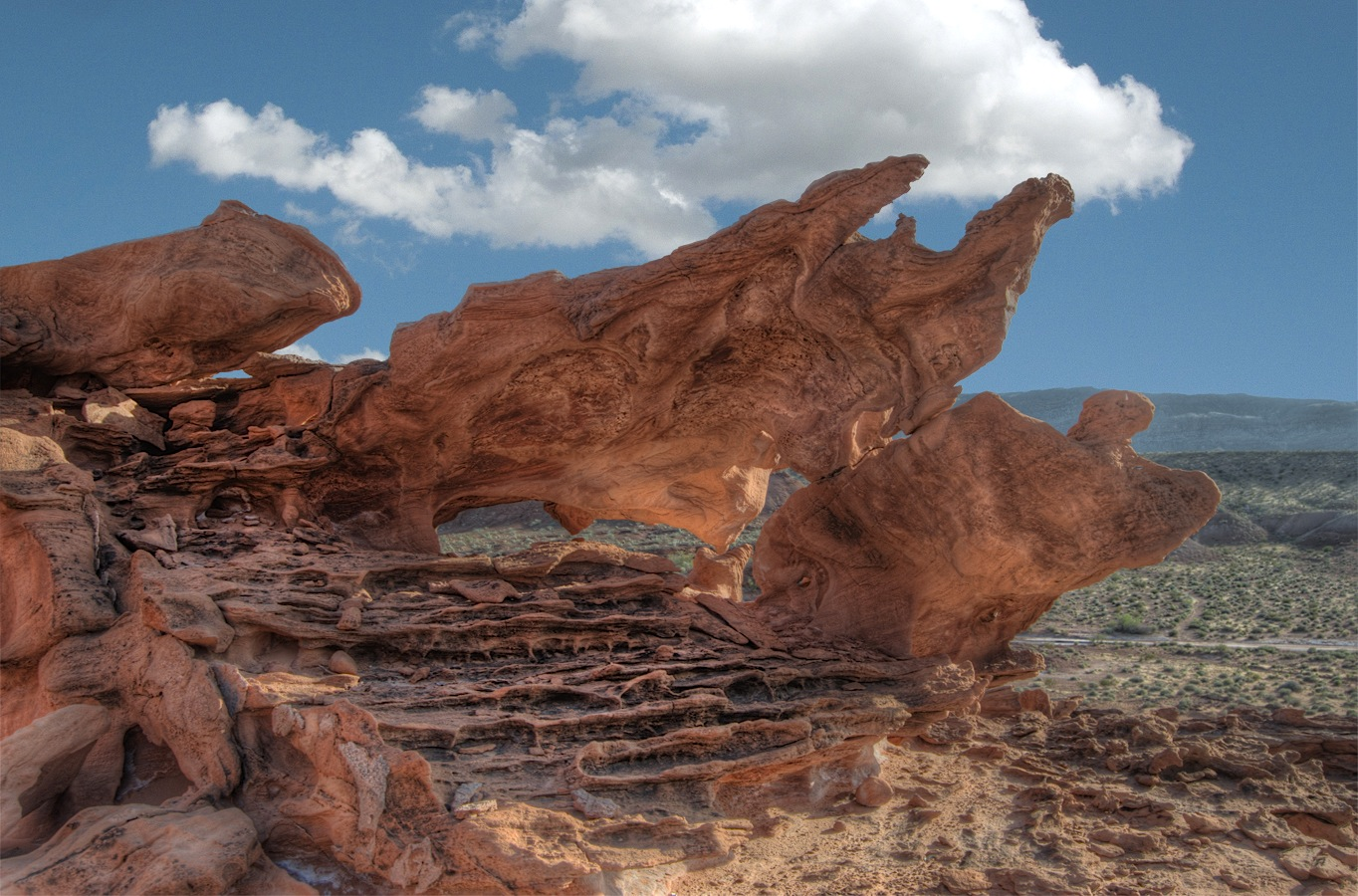
Little Finland rock formation

Little Finland (also known as Hobgoblin’s Playground and Devil’s Fire) is a scenic redrock area, located in a remote section of Clark County, Nevada, south of Mesquite, known for its redrock scenery and strangely-shaped, delicate rock formations. The landscape is similar to Valley of Fire State Park, which is about 20 miles (32 km) to the west, across Lake Mead. The rock formations are composed of red Aztec Sandstone, fossil sand dunes. Many of the features are small erosional fins, hence the name.

Little Finland is accessible via the BLM Gold Butte Backcountry Byway, which also goes through the historic mining town of Gold Butte, Nevada, established in 1908. Other nearby attractions include Whitney Pockets, another scenic red rock area with petroglyphs, and the Devils Throat, a sinkhole. The Gold Butte region is public land managed by the Bureau of Land Management that contains seven BLM-designated Areas of Critical Environmental Concern (ACEC). Since December 2016, Little Finland and the surrounding area have additional federal protection within Gold Butte National Monument.

Two BLM wilderness areas are nearby. The Lime Canyon Wilderness borders Little Finland and the west side of the Gold Butte Byway loop. The Jumbo Springs Wilderness is south of the Gold Butte townsite.

== Gallery ==
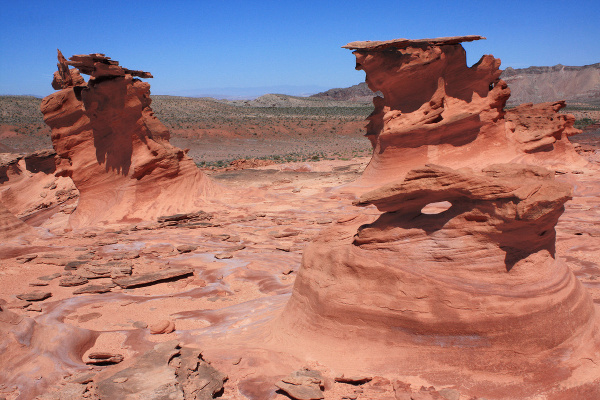

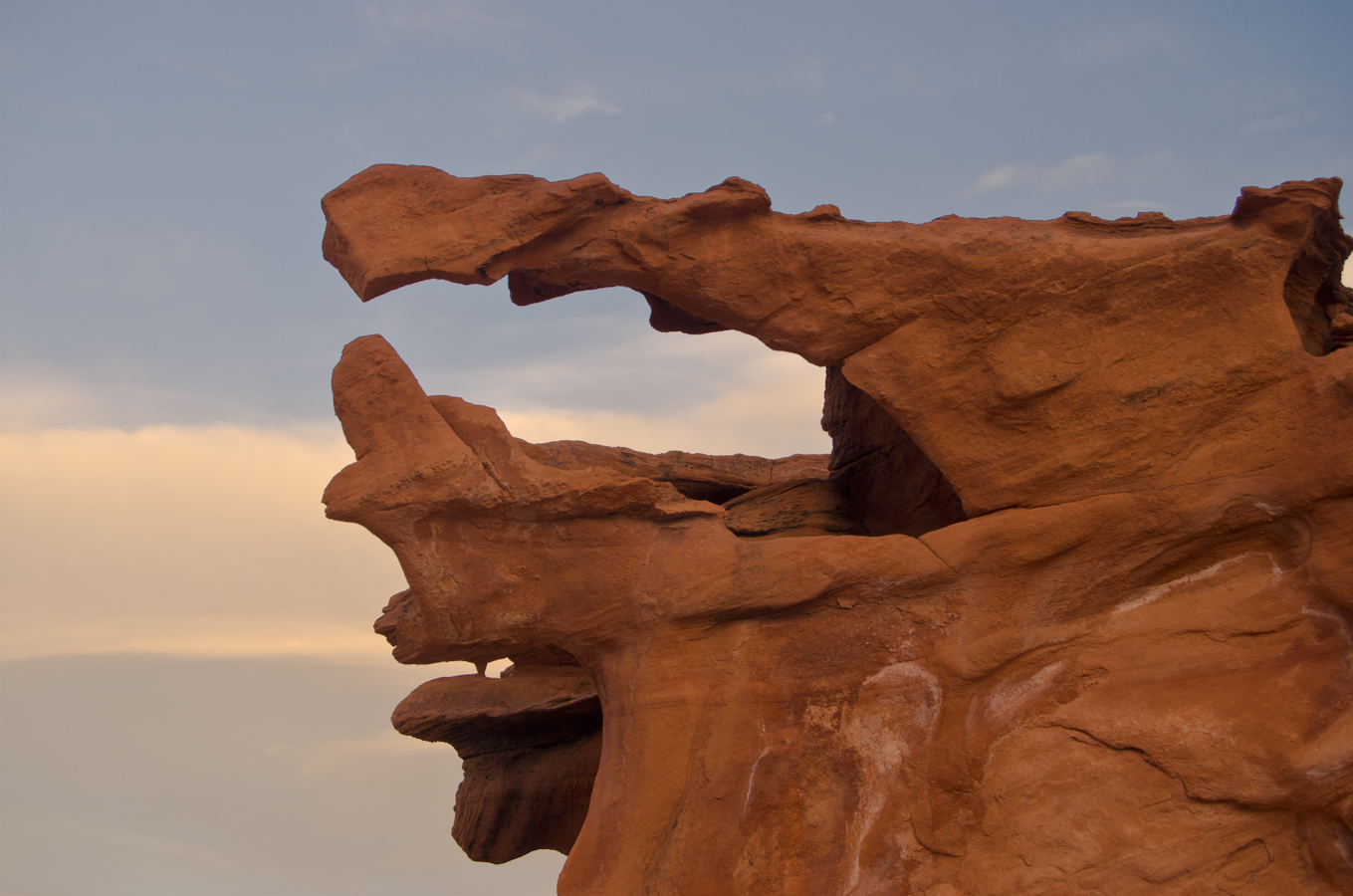

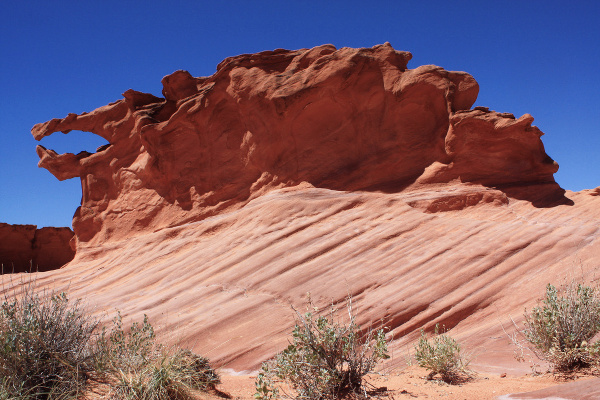

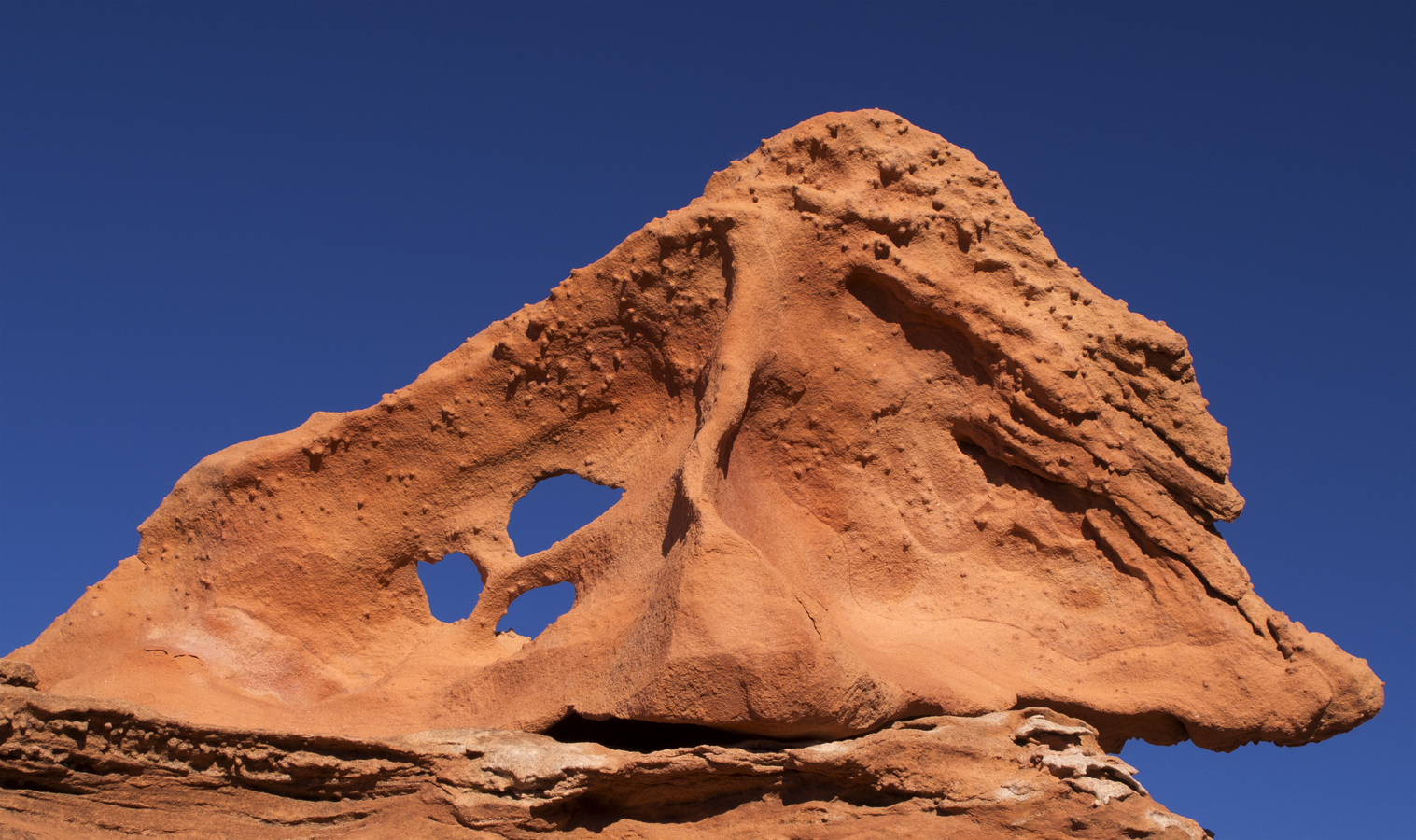

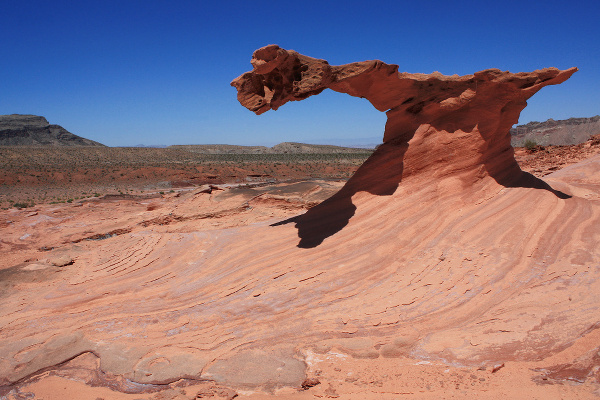

== See also ==
- Lake Mead National Recreation Area, to the west and south of Little Finland
- Grand Canyon-Parashant National Monument, to the east, in Arizona
- Bureau of Land Management Back Country Byway
