= The Kempton Hotel =

Hotel in Terry, Montana, United States

Coordinates: 46.7926°N 105.3119°W

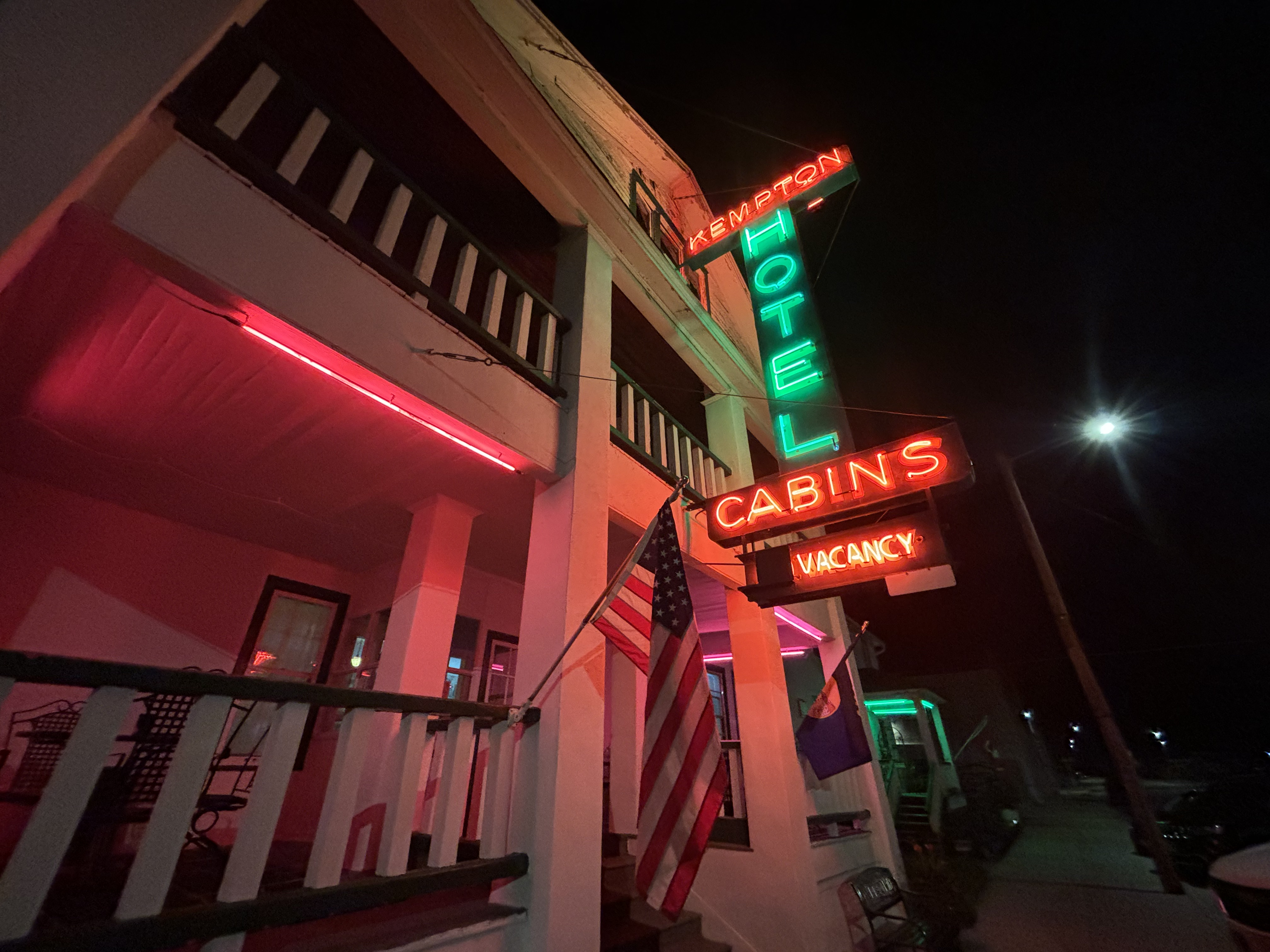
- Kempton Hotel Entrance
- Interactive map of the The Kempton Hotel area

General information
- Location: Terry, Montana, United States, 204 Spring St.
- Year built: 1902
- Opened: June 15, 1902
- Owner: Russell and Linda Schwartz

Other information
- Number of rooms: 9

Website
- kemptonhotel.co

The Kempton Hotel is a historic hotel located in Terry, Montana. It is located in Eastern Montana in the badlands off I-94 at Exit 176.

== History ==
The Kempton is the oldest continuously operated hotel in Montana. It was originally built by homesteaders in the area, as are the current owners who have kept the hotel in its original decor. Russell and Linda Schwartz have always lived in Eastern Montana, and Russell has ties to the Kempton whose grandmother was babysat by Martha Kempton. They purchased the Kempton Hotel in 1990 and began improving and restoring it. The hotel also features an attached antiques store.

The hotel has hosted several famous guests throughout its history, including former U.S. president Theodore Rosevelt and frontierswoman Calamity Jane.
