= Evelyn Cameron =

American photographer

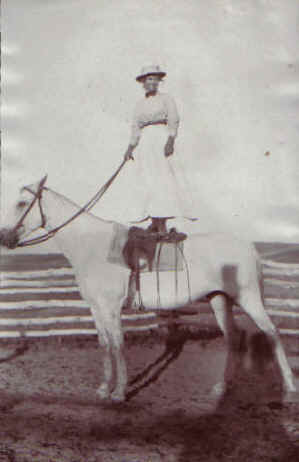
- Evelyn Cameron, seen standing upright on a horse.
- Born: Evelyn Jephson Flower; August 26, 1868; Furze Down Park, near Streatham, England, United Kingdom
- Died: December 26, 1928 (aged 60); Terry, Montana, United States
- Occupations: photographer, rancher, farmer
- Spouse: Ewen Somerled Cameron

Evelyn Cameron (August 26, 1868 – December 26, 1928) was a photographer and diarist of the American West, who documented her life as a pioneer near Terry, Montana from the late 1890s onward. She is best known for her photography chronicling the early life of settlers in Eastern Montana, depicting cowboys, sheepherders, weddings, river crossings, freight wagons, ranch work, badlands, eagles, coyotes and wolves.

== Early life and education ==
Evelyn Jephson Flower was born to a wealthy merchant family at Furzedown Park, south of London, England. She was the eighth child of her father's second marriage, with three surviving older brothers and one older sister. Phillip William Flower's position as a merchant in the East India Company secured his family's comfort in the upper echelons of British society.

Evelyn received the traditional education given to young women of the upper class, and could speak Italian, German, and French. She and her sister, Hilda, were educated at their home by a French governess, and their mother's work as a composer ensured them a thorough musical education.

However, Evelyn was noted for preferring outdoor activities, such as horseback riding and hunting to traditional domestic activities, even before her move to the wilds of Montana.

== Marriage and moving west ==
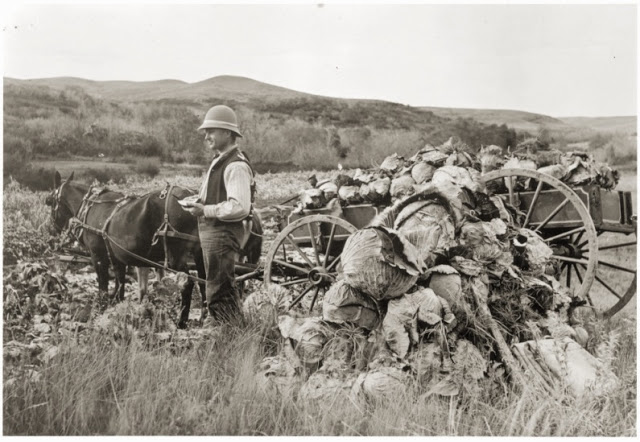
1898 photo by Evelyn Cameron of her brother harvesting cabbages

Ewen Somerled Cameron was a family friend of the Flowers, and a hunting companion of Evelyn's oldest brother, Percy Flower. Over a decade Evelyn's senior, he was a Scotsman inhabiting the Orkney Islands and dedicated to ornithology, hunting and equestrian pursuits. Cameron was also married to the American opera singer Julia A. Wheelock (Guilia Vlada) in January 1881. The annulment of their marriage by the Court of Session in Edinburgh was finalized on October 17, 1889, a month into his and Evelyn's first expedition to Montana.

Ewen and Evelyn arrived in New York City in September, shortly after Evelyn's twenty-first birthday, upon which she inherited a generous trust from her deceased father's will. The bequest made her financially independent of her family, who disapproved of her traveling with a married man.

Following the earlier direction of Evelyn's brother Percy, who had hunted west of Miles City before the expansion of the railroad into Eastern Montana, the couple hunted along the Yellowstone River from November 1, 1889 to August 1, 1890, which Evelyn later recalls as her honeymoon.

After traveling back to Britain to collect their belongings, the Camerons finally migrated to Montana in September 1891, along with Evelyn's brother Alec, and set up their first ranching venture. Over the years the Camerons would move to three different ranches in the area around Terry, Montana, trying their hands at raising polo ponies and cattle ranching. Their homesteading would be interrupted by Ewen Cameron's ill health and a year-long trip back to Britain from the summer of 1900 to 1901.

== Career ==
1912 photo by Cameron of rimrock above a ranch house in what is now the ghost town of Lonetree, Montana.

Evelyn was introduced to photography by a boarder at their ranch house, and in July 1894, Ewen purchased their first camera. The boarder, an Irishman named Mr. Adams educated Evelyn on the basics of glass-plate photography and after his departure was replaced by a Briton known as Mr Colley. Mr Colley added to Evelyn's knowledge of photography and was a partner in her experiments to improve her work, by practicing different shutter times and processing methods. Evelyn was soon frequently requested at public gatherings and life events, to photograph weddings, family portraits and, by her husband, wildlife.

Evelyn's work often accompanied her husband's observations of the local fauna of the region. Some articles that included her work are "The Mule Deer in Montana" in the British periodical Land and Water, as well as "Nesting of the Golden Eagle in Montana" from The Auk, an ornithological journal. Evelyn was not credited in either of these publications. However, in a 1905 article she wrote for The Breeder's Gazette in Chicago, titled "Sheep in Montana", which included her photography of surrounding sheep ranches, she was listed as the author and photographer.

Cameron garnered national acclaim for the area through the work of former Time-Life Books editor, Donna Lucey. In the late 1970s, Lucey discovered thousands of Cameron's prints and negatives, along with diaries and letters covering thirty-six years of frontier life, stashed away in the basement of Cameron's best friend's home. After intensive study of the photos and documents Lucey wrote a biography, Photographing Montana 1894-1928: The Life and Work of Evelyn Cameron, which reproduces more than 170 Cameron images.

The bulk of the photographs are now housed at the Montana Historical Society in Helena, Montana. Prints and artifacts are also displayed at the Evelyn Cameron museum in Terry, Montana. Many of the diaries and photographs have been made available online through collaboration with the Montana Memory Project.

Cameron is the subject of the PBS documentary, Evelyn Cameron: Pictures From A Worthy Life.

== Bibliography ==
- Lucey, Donna M. (1990). Photographing Montana, 1894-1928: The Life and Work of Evelyn Cameron. New York: Alfred A. Knopf. ISBN 0394540360.
- Milne, Lorna (2017). Evelyn Cameron: Photographer on the Western Prairie. Missoula Montana: Mountain Press Publishing Company. ISBN 978-0878426751.
- Roberts, Anne; Wordsworth, Christine (2014). "Divas, Divorce, and Disclosure: Hidden Narratives in the Diaries of Evelyn Cameron". Montana: The Magazine of Western History.
