= List of New Mexico Scenic and Historic Byways =

Scenic and Historic Byway
- Highway markers for Interstate 25, US Highway 64 and State Route 68

Highway names
- Interstates: Interstate nn (I-nn)
- US Highways: US Highway nn (US-nn)
- State: State Route nn (SR-nn)

System links
- New Mexico State Highway System; Interstate; US; State; Scenic

Scenic and Historic Byways are highways in New Mexico known for their scenic beauty or historic significance. The New Mexico State Highway and Transportation Department Scenic and Historic Byways Program was made effective July 31, 1998 to establish procedures for designating and managing state scenic and historic byways.

== List ==
=== State designated byways ===
The following table is a list of scenic byways in New Mexico according to the U.S. Secretary of Transportation: (Note: There were three roads designated as Scenic and Historic Byways by the state of New Mexico on July 31, 1998 that are no longer considered scenic byways, including: the 11 mile Sandia Crest Scenic Byway on NM 536 through the Cibola National Forest, the 110 mile Gila Cliff Dwellings/Inner Loop Scenic Byway along NM 15 and NM 35 through Gila National Forest and the Dry Cimmaron Byway.)

Byway	Length	Notes	National Designation	State Designation
Abo Pass Trail	31 miles	A scenic drive through the Salt Missions area along NM 47 and US 60.		July 31, 1998
Billy the Kid National Scenic Byway	84 miles	History of the Wild West.	NSB June 9, 1998	July 31, 1998
Corrales Road Scenic Byway	6.7 miles	Beautiful views and shaded cottonwoods along NM 448		July 31, 1998
El Camino Real National Scenic Byway	276 miles	The former El Camino Real de Tierra Adentro, or King's Highway.	NSB June 9, 1998, September 22, 2005 (extended)	July 31, 1998
Enchanted Circle Scenic Byway	84 miles	A loop of scenic North Central New Mexico.		July 31, 1998
Geronimo Trail National Scenic Byway	154 miles	A historic route commemorating Chiricahua Apache warrior Geronimo.	NSB September 22, 2005	July 31, 1998
Guadalupe Back Country Byway	30 miles	Provides access to recreational opportunities	BLM September 26, 1994	July 31, 1998
Jemez Mountain Trail National Scenic Byway	132 miles	Scenic trip past geologic formations.	NSB June 9, 1998	July 31, 1998
La Frontera Del Llano	94.3 miles	Travel through plains and grasslands areas.		By 2013
Lake Valley Back Country Byway	44 miles	Lake Valley mining town ruins from 1880 accessed via dirt roads.	BLM April 14, 1993	July 31, 1998
Mesalands Scenic Byway	320 miles	Views of mesas and steep rock walls in central New Mexico.		July 31, 1998
Narrow Gauge Scenic Byway	9.9 miles	Scenic, historic drive		July 31, 1998
Puye Cliffs Scenic Byway	14 miles	Santa Clara Pueblo is located on the byway		By 2013
Quebradas Back Country Byway	24 miles	Scenic, rugged back country road east of Socorro.	BLM June 20, 1989	July 31, 1998
Route 66 National Scenic Byway	604 miles	US 66 crosses the state	NSB June 15, 2000	July 31, 1998
Salt Missions Trail Byway	140 miles	Scenic, historic trail		July 31, 1998
Santa Fe National Forest Scenic Byway	15 miles	Recreational opportunities and mountain scenery along NM 475	NFSB	July 31, 1998
Santa Fe Trail National Scenic Byway	277 miles	Historic trail of westward expansion.	NSB June 9, 1998	July 31, 1998
Socorro Historical District Scenic Byway	3 miles	Historic byway		By 2013
Sunspot Scenic Byway	14 miles	Views of the Tularosa Basin, Sacramento Mountains, and White Sands National Park through the Lincoln National Forest, along NM 6563		July 31, 1998
The High Road to Taos Byway	52 miles	Scenic, historic and artistic byway		By 2013
Trail of the Ancients Scenic Byway	662 miles	Routes of prehistoric "world-famous" archeological sites.		By 2013
Trail of the Mountain Spirits National Scenic Byway	72 miles	Scenic views of southwestern New Mexico.	NSB September 22, 2005	By 2013
Turquoise Trail National Scenic Byway	52 miles	Scenic route between Santa Fe and Albuquerque.	NSB June 15, 2000	July 31, 1998
Wild Rivers Back Country Scenic Byway	13 miles	Byway through Rio Grande canyon area in the high plains of northern New Mexico.	BLM June 20, 1989	July 31, 1998

=== Other byways ===
Byway	Length	Notes	Type of byway	Designated
Chain of Craters Back Country Byway			Bureau of Land Management Back Country Byway	March 10, 1993.
Navajo Nations Scenic Byways			Navajo Nation Transportation Development Committee (Note: The plans for Navajo National Scenic Byways were developed by a task force including the Arizona Department of Transportation, and Bureau of Indian Affairs. It is administered with the Federal Highway Administration.)	Beginning in 1996
