= Quebradas Back Country Byway =

Quebradas Back Country Byway

Route information
- Maintained by BLM
- Length: 24 mi (39 km)
- Restrictions: Type II byway

Major junctions
- From: East of San Antonio
- To: Near Socorro

Location
- Country: United States
- State: New Mexico
- Counties: Socorro

Highway system
- Scenic Byways; National; National Forest; BLM; NPS; New Mexico State Highway System; Interstate; US; State; Scenic

Quebradas Back Country Byway is a scenic byway in Socorro County, New Mexico, United States. It is managed by the Bureau of Land Management. It was listed as a Bureau of Land Management Back Country Byway on June 20, 1989, and as a New Mexico Scenic and Historic Byway on July 31, 1998.

== Route description ==
With a length of about 24 miles (39 km), the Quebradas Back Country Byway can be picked up in the north of southwestern New Mexico, near I-25, close to Socorro at the Escondida exit. The byway stretches over to the east and then down to US 380 in the south. Outdoor enthusiasts enjoy a variety of activities along the byway including hiking, photography, ATVing, rockhounding, and biking.

The byway is known for its geographical features such as the quebrada (Spanish for 'break' / 'ravine'), which in New Mexico often refers in plural to the eroded escarpment of a plain or mesa. Other features include badlands, fossils, rhombohedral calcite crystals, malachite, azurite and more. Interesting attractions are along the byway including the Ojo de Amado pool and Minas del Chupadero, which is an abandoned mining area including a mining shaft, adit, and several exploration pits.

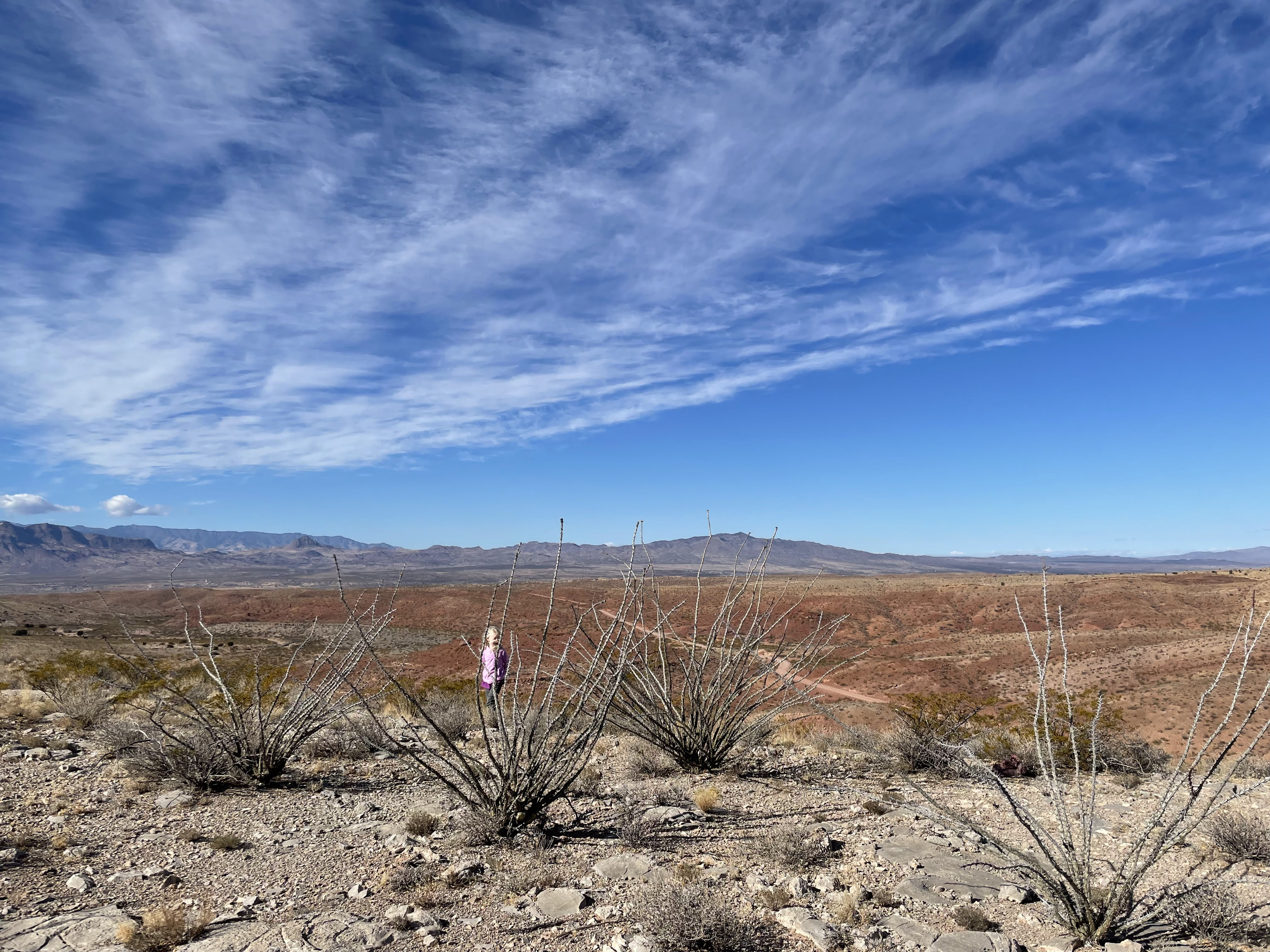
Quebradas Back Country Byway

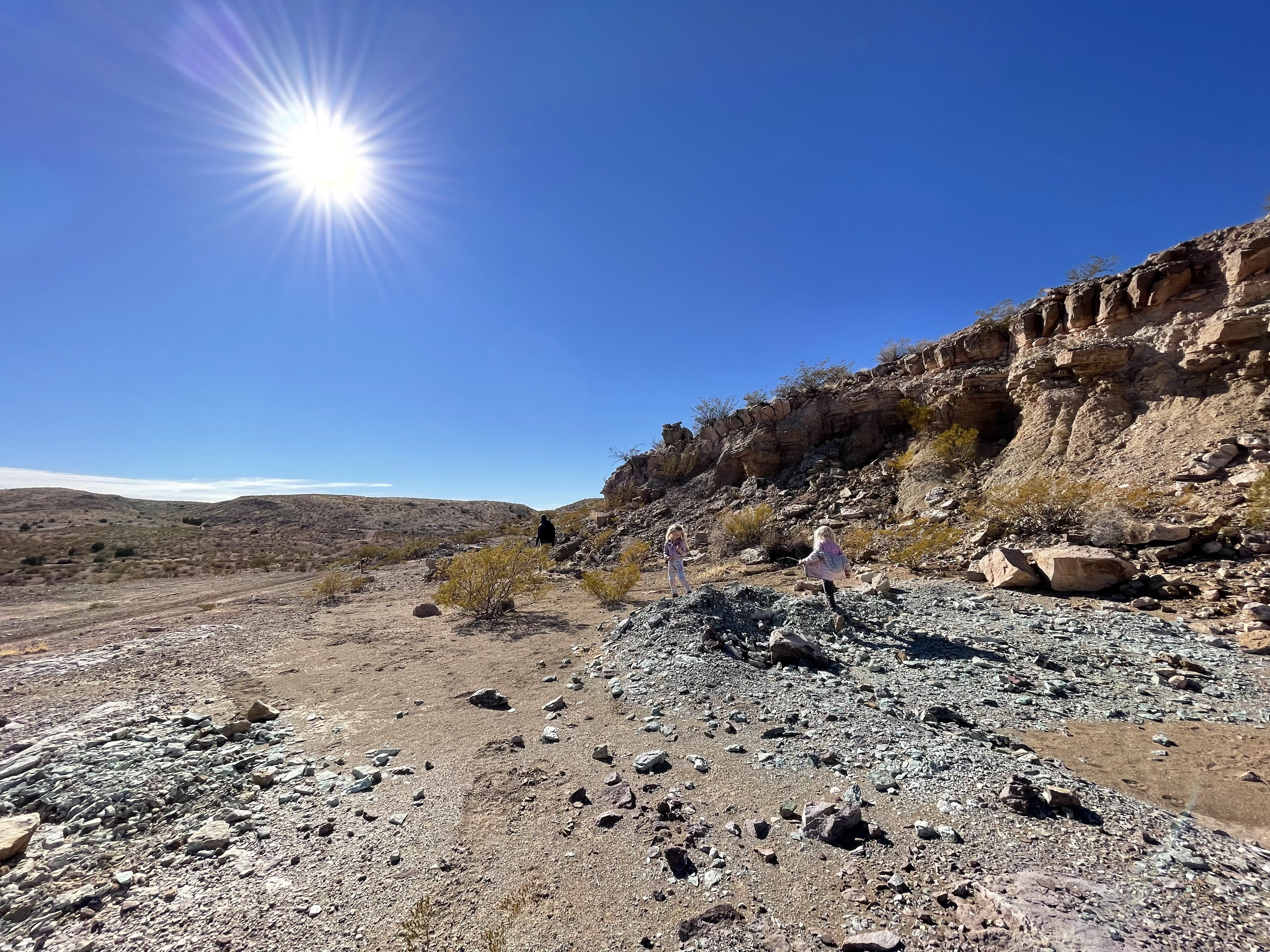
Malachite Mounds

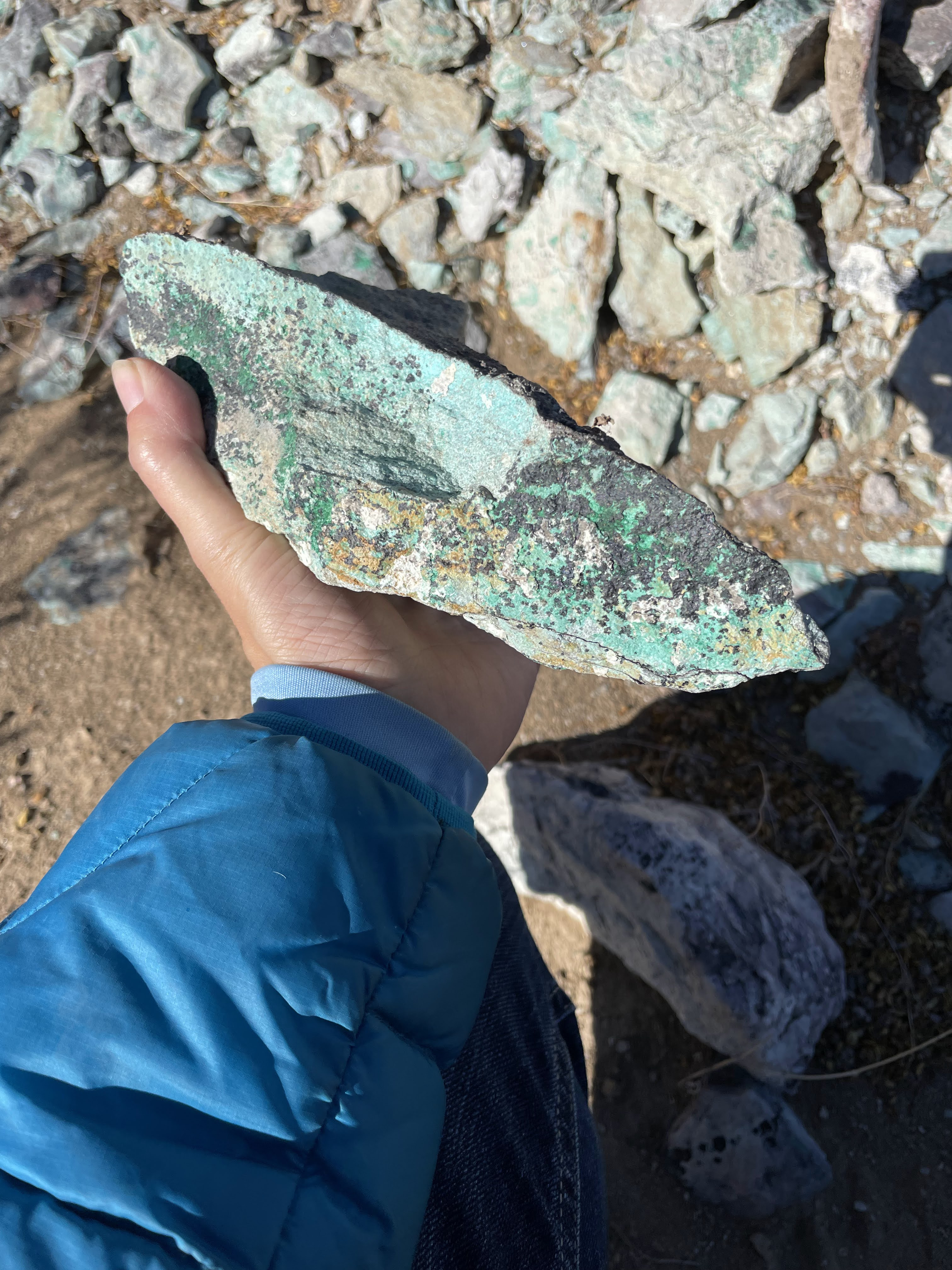
Malachite
