= Terry, Montana =

Town and county seat in Prairie County, Montana, US

- Town
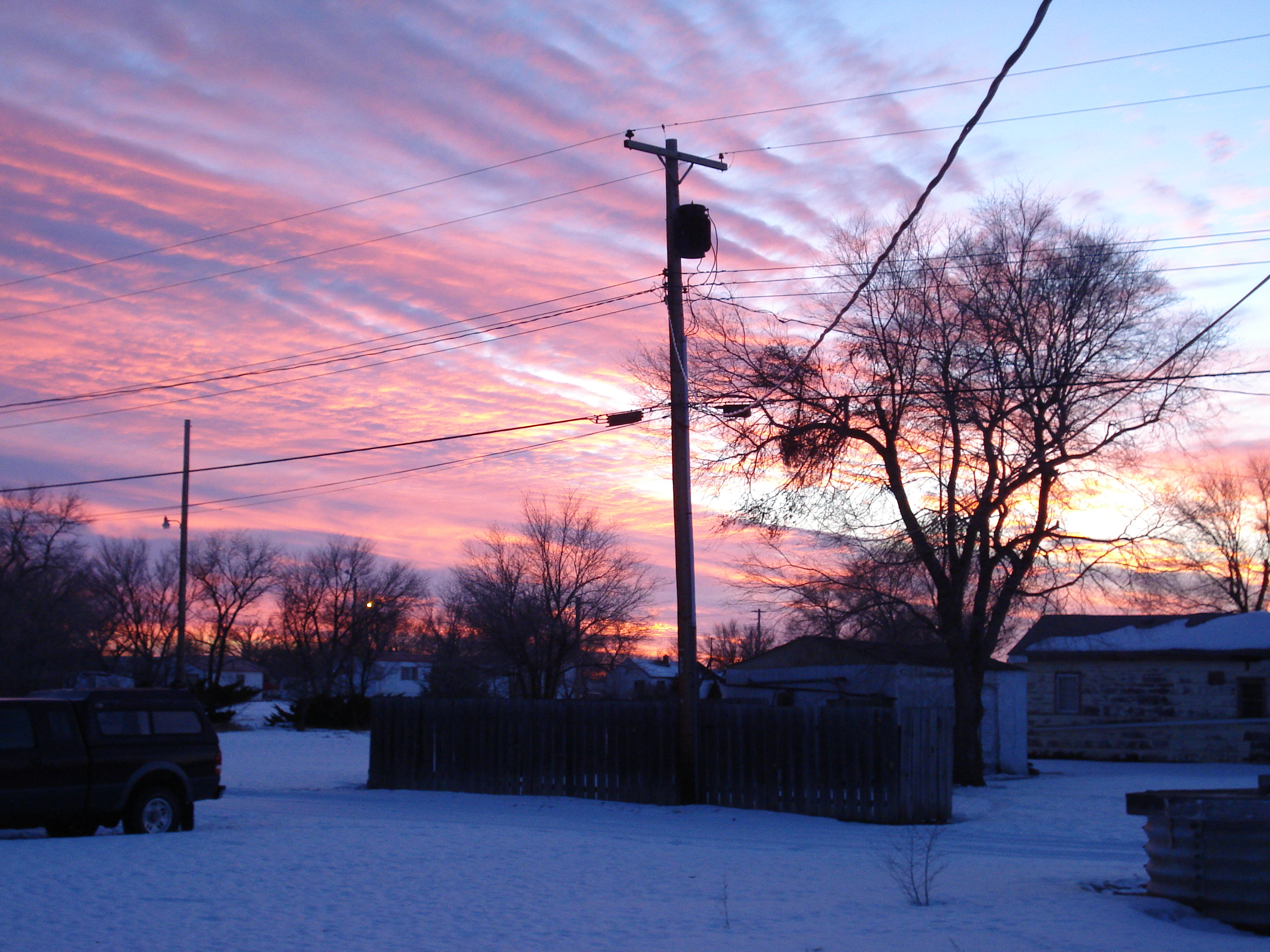
- The Yellowstone Street district at sunset.

- Terry, Montana located in Prairie County

- Location in the United States
- Coordinates: 46°47′32″N 105°18′45″W
- Country: United States
- State: Montana
- County: Prairie
- Township of Terry: 1884

Government
  - Type: Mayor - City Council
  - Mayor: Rolane Christofferson

Area
  - Total: 0.78 sq mi (2.02 km^{2})
  - Land: 0.78 sq mi (2.02 km^{2})
  - Water: 0 sq mi (0.00 km^{2})
- Elevation: 2,254 ft (687 m)

Population (2020)
  - Total: 562
  - Density: 719.4/sq mi (277.75/km^{2})
- Time zone: UTC-7 (Mountain (MST))
  - Summer (DST): UTC-6 (MDT)
- ZIP code: 59349
- Area code: 406
- FIPS code: 30-73675
- GNIS feature ID: 2413377
- Website: townofterry.com

Terry, is a town in Prairie County, Montana, United States, and the county seat. The population was 562 at the 2020 census.

== History ==
The site where Terry is located was first called Joubert's Landing, in recognition of the man who built a supply point along the Yellowstone River for freighters traveling from Bismarck, Dakota Territory, to Miles City, Montana Territory. When the Northern Pacific Railway's transcontinental rail line arrived in 1881, the town was renamed for Alfred Howe Terry, a general in the Union Army who commanded an 1876 expedition in connection with George Armstrong Custer’s campaign against Native Americans, specifically in the west.

Terry became a two-railroad town when the Milwaukee Road constructed a transcontinental line known as the Pacific Extension through the town in the early 20th century. The Custer Creek train wreck, the worst rail disaster in Montana history, occurred near Terry along this line in 1938. The town was incorporated in 1910.

== Geography ==
Terry is in Eastern Montana, approximately 1 km (0.62 mi) south of the Yellowstone River. According to the United States Census Bureau, the town has a total area of 0.71 square miles (1.84 km^{2}), all land.

The Terry Badlands lie just north of the Yellowstone River, and is one of the wilderness study areas in Montana.

=== Climate ===
The town on average has over 200 days of sunshine a year. The average annual snowfall is 17.6 inches a year.

Climate data for Terry, Montana (1991–2020 normals, extremes 1949–present)
Month	Jan	Feb	Mar	Apr	May	Jun	Jul	Aug	Sep	Oct	Nov	Dec	Year
Record high °F (°C)	65 (18)	73 (23)	83 (28)	93 (34)	102 (39)	110 (43)	113 (45)	111 (44)	106 (41)	94 (34)	79 (26)	72 (22)	113 (45)
Mean maximum °F (°C)	50.2 (10.1)	55.4 (13.0)	69.9 (21.1)	80.4 (26.9)	87.3 (30.7)	95.9 (35.5)	101.6 (38.7)	101.2 (38.4)	95.7 (35.4)	83.2 (28.4)	66.7 (19.3)	54.2 (12.3)	104.0 (40.0)
Mean daily maximum °F (°C)	28.4 (−2.0)	33.7 (0.9)	46.2 (7.9)	57.9 (14.4)	68.0 (20.0)	78.2 (25.7)	88.1 (31.2)	87.0 (30.6)	75.7 (24.3)	59.1 (15.1)	43.8 (6.6)	32.2 (0.1)	58.2 (14.6)
Daily mean °F (°C)	17.2 (−8.2)	22.2 (−5.4)	33.8 (1.0)	45.0 (7.2)	55.4 (13.0)	65.4 (18.6)	73.3 (22.9)	71.5 (21.9)	60.5 (15.8)	45.9 (7.7)	31.9 (−0.1)	21.0 (−6.1)	45.3 (7.4)
Mean daily minimum °F (°C)	6.1 (−14.4)	10.8 (−11.8)	21.5 (−5.8)	32.2 (0.1)	42.7 (5.9)	52.6 (11.4)	58.5 (14.7)	56.0 (13.3)	45.3 (7.4)	32.7 (0.4)	20.0 (−6.7)	9.7 (−12.4)	32.3 (0.2)
Mean minimum °F (°C)	−21.6 (−29.8)	−12.1 (−24.5)	−1.4 (−18.6)	14.5 (−9.7)	26.6 (−3.0)	39.7 (4.3)	47.3 (8.5)	41.6 (5.3)	31.0 (−0.6)	16.1 (−8.8)	−2.7 (−19.3)	−12.7 (−24.8)	−30.1 (−34.5)
Record low °F (°C)	−45 (−43)	−41 (−41)	−35 (−37)	−5 (−21)	11 (−12)	27 (−3)	34 (1)	28 (−2)	15 (−9)	−9 (−23)	−31 (−35)	−47 (−44)	−47 (−44)
Average precipitation inches (mm)	0.29 (7.4)	0.34 (8.6)	0.44 (11)	1.43 (36)	2.51 (64)	2.36 (60)	1.90 (48)	1.31 (33)	1.17 (30)	0.92 (23)	0.37 (9.4)	0.32 (8.1)	13.36 (339)
Average snowfall inches (cm)	3.3 (8.4)	1.4 (3.6)	1.2 (3.0)	1.0 (2.5)	0.0 (0.0)	0.0 (0.0)	0.0 (0.0)	0.0 (0.0)	0.0 (0.0)	0.2 (0.51)	1.6 (4.1)	3.1 (7.9)	11.8 (30)
Average precipitation days (≥ 0.01 in)	4.6	3.2	4.5	6.4	9.3	9.4	7.3	5.3	4.4	4.9	2.8	3.1	65.2
Average snowy days (≥ 0.1 in)	2.0	1.4	0.7	0.4	0.0	0.0	0.0	0.0	0.0	0.1	0.6	1.3	6.5
Source: NOAA

== Demographics ==
Historical population
Census	Pop.	Note	%±
1920	794		—
1930	779		−1.9%
1940	1,012		29.9%
1950	1,191		17.7%
1960	1,140		−4.3%
1970	870		−23.7%
1980	929		6.8%
1990	659		−29.1%
2000	611		−7.3%
2010	605		−1.0%
2020	562		−7.1%
U.S. Decennial Census

=== 2010 census ===
As of the census of 2010, there were 605 people, 292 households, and 168 families residing in the town. The population density was 852.1 inhabitants per square mile (329.0/km^{2}). There were 357 housing units at an average density of 502.8 units per square mile (194.1 units/km^{2}). The racial makeup of the town was 96.5% White, 0.2% Native American, 0.7% Asian, and 2.6% from two or more races. Hispanic or Latino of any race were 0.7% of the population.

There were 292 households, of which 17.1% had children under the age of 18 living with them, 50.3% were married couples living together, 5.8% had a female householder with no husband present, 1.4% had a male householder with no wife present, and 42.5% were non-families. 38.4% of all households were made up of individuals, and 22.2% had someone living alone who was 65 years of age or older. The average household size was 2.00 and the average family size was 2.62.

The median age in the town was 57 years. 17.7% of residents were under the age of 18; 3.1% were between the ages of 18 and 24; 15.6% were from 25 to 44; 31.3% were from 45 to 64; and 32.4% were 65 years of age or older. The gender makeup of the town was 48.3% male and 51.7% female.

=== 2000 census ===
As of the census of 2000, there were 611 people, 294 households, and 171 families residing in the town. The population density was 866.2 inhabitants per square mile (334.4/km^{2}). There were 387 housing units at an average density of 548.7 units per square mile (211.9 units/km^{2}). The racial makeup of the town was 97.55% White, 0.33% Native American, 0.33% Asian, 0.16% from other races, and 1.64% from two or more races. Hispanic or Latino of any race were 0.98% of the population.

There were 294 households, out of which 18.7% had children under the age of 18 living with them, 53.1% were married couples living together, 3.7% had a female householder with no husband present, and 41.5% were non-families. 39.1% of all households were made up of individuals, and 23.5% had someone living alone who was 65 years of age or older. The average household size was 2.00 and the average family size was 2.62.

In the town, the population was spread out, with 17.2% under the age of 18, 3.6% from 18 to 24, 15.1% from 25 to 44, 32.9% from 45 to 64, and 31.3% who were 65 years of age or older. The median age was 53 years. For every 100 females there were 96.5 males. For every 100 females age 18 and over, there were 93.9 males.

The median income for a household in the town was $25,294, and the median income for a family was $34,531. Males had a median income of $25,938 versus $21,538 for females. The per capita income for the town was $15,093. About 3.5% of families and 8.4% of the population were below the poverty line, including 4.9% of those under age 18 and 15.9% of those age 65 or over.

== Culture ==
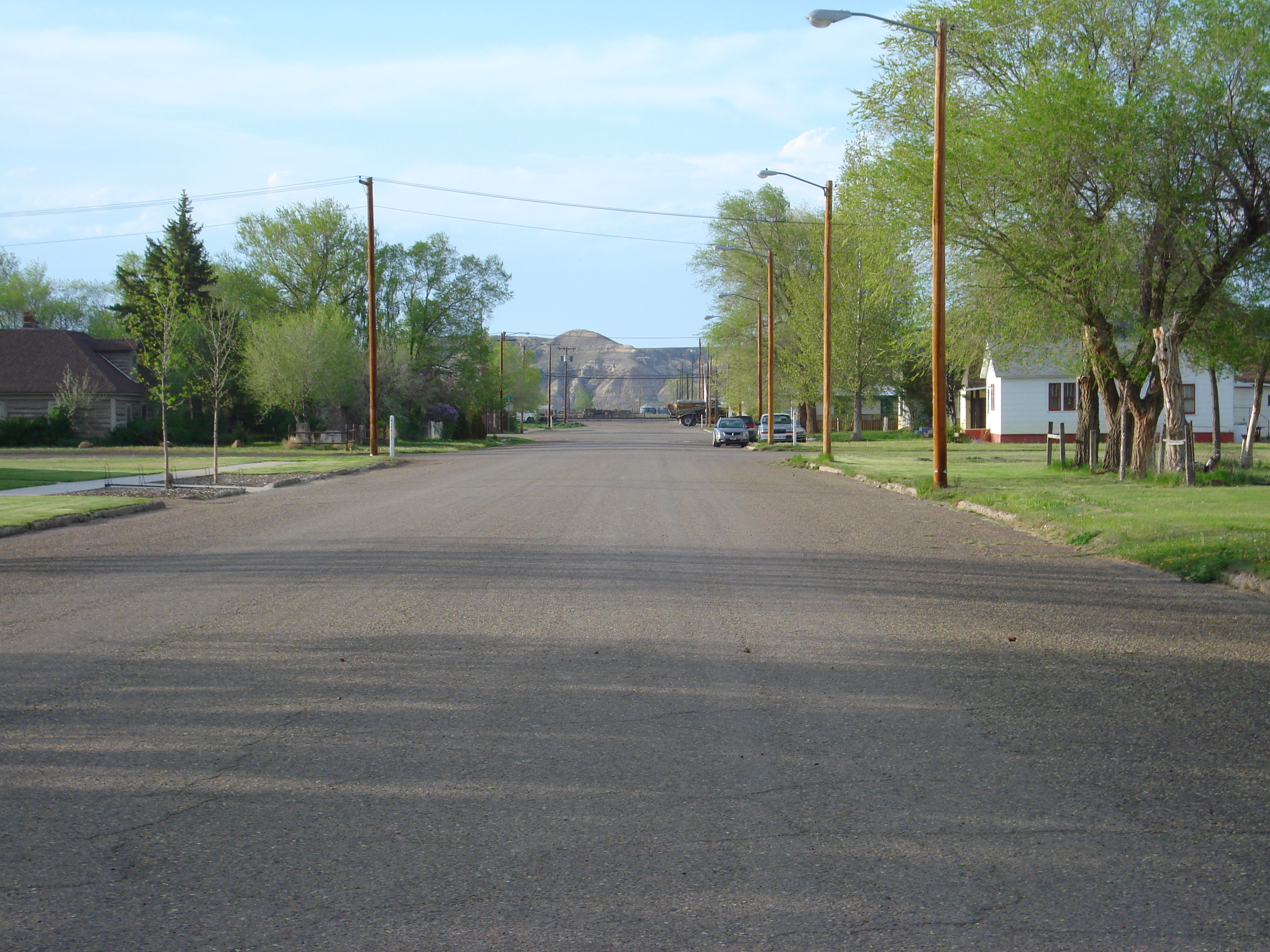
Terry in May 2009

=== Events ===
Several festivals are held annually in Terry. The largest of these events is "Terry Yippie", a town-wide BBQ and games fair held in Terry Central Park. The Evelyn Cameron Gala is often in the fall. In August, the Prairie County Fair is held at the Terry Fairgrounds.

=== Tourism ===
The Terry Badlands WSA and the Evelyn Cameron Museum attract visitors from all over the world every year. The guest registry in the Evelyn Cameron museum has entries from as far away as Europe, Asia, and Africa. Efforts to increase ecotourism include an Americorps VISTA project to create a trail network for hikers and campers in the surrounding badlands. The Terry Badlands Trails Project encourages the Leave No Trace principles.

Terry is home to the historic Kempton Hotel which is the oldest continuously operated hotel in Montana, running since 1902. The hotel has hosted the likes of U.S. President Theodore Rosevelt and frontierswoman Calamity Jane.

== Government ==
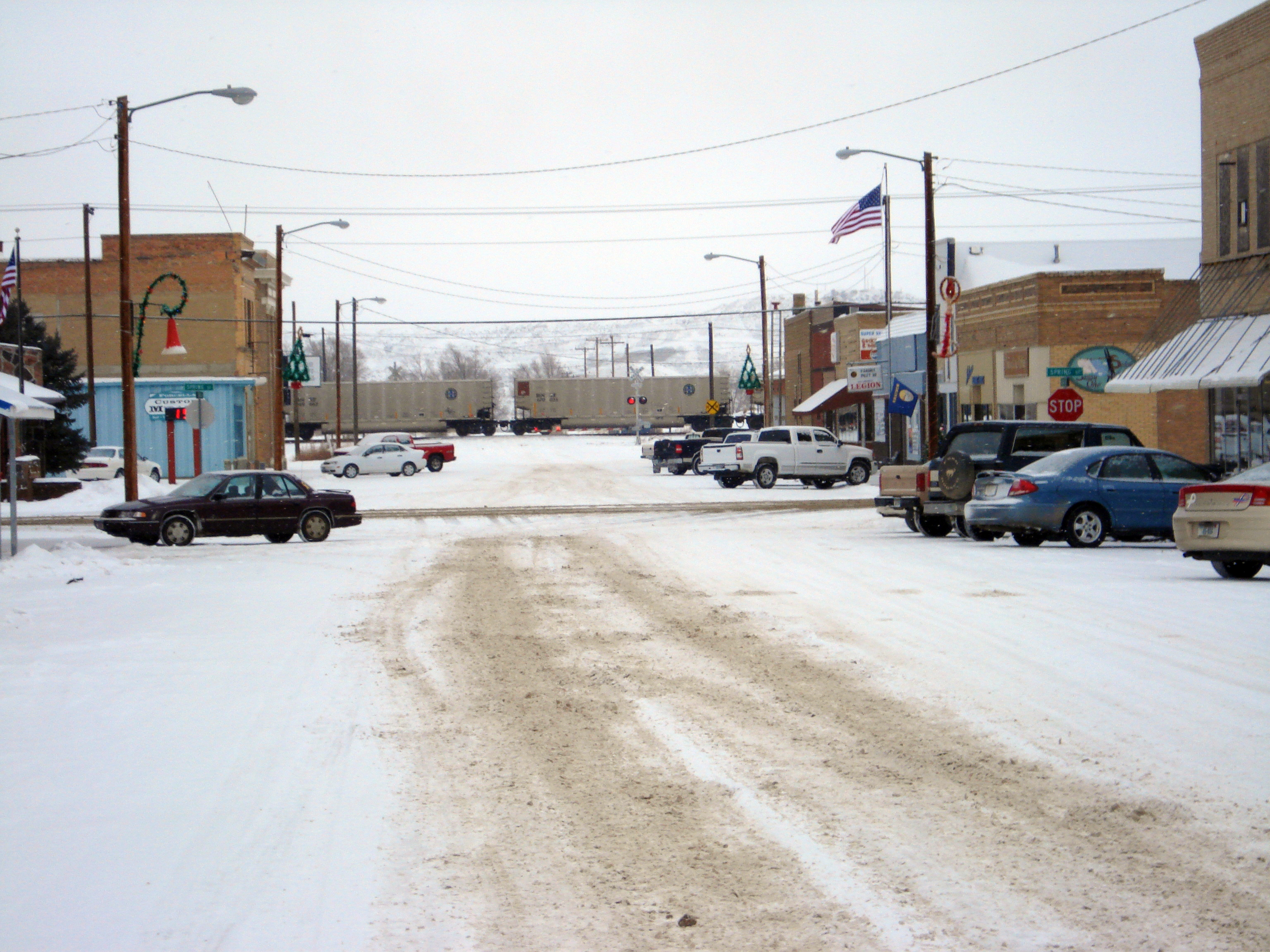
Terry in January 2009

The Township of Terry has a Mayor-Council government with Rolane Christofferson serving as mayor. The City Council is made up of four council members serving two wards.

=== Neighborhoods ===
- Downtown
- Yellowstone District
- West Town
- Terry Central Park

== Education ==
The only schools in Prairie County are located in Terry. The K-12 enrollment at the beginning of the 07–08 school year was 125 students. Terrier sports programs won state championships in football from 1985 to 1987. They were runner up 4 other times in the 1980s and 1990s. They also won volleyball titles in 1988, 1989 and 2010.

Prairie County Library serves the area.

== Media ==
The major newspaper in Terry is the Terry Tribune, established in 1908. It is published weekly and also as an e-edition.

== Infrastructure ==
The town is just north of Interstate 94, at the cross roads of old highway 10 and highway 253.

Terry Airport is a public use airport located 1 mile southeast of town.

== Notable people ==
- Norm Clarke, gossip columnist
- Evelyn Cameron, photographer
- Donna Lucey, author
- Robert M. Losey, American meteorologist and air force officer

== See also ==
- List of municipalities in Montana
