= Lonetree, Montana =

- Lonetree
- U.S. National Register of Historic Places
- 1912 photo by Evelyn Cameron of a Lonetree ranch

- Location within Montana Location within the United States
- Location: Chouteau County, Montana
- Nearest city: Geraldine, Montana
- Coordinates: 47°32′30″N 110°17′03″W
- Built: 1885
- Architect: Christopher Wilson, Edward Wilson
- NRHP reference No.: 80002410
- Added to NRHP: September 11, 1980

Lonetree (also Lone Tree or Steele) is a ghost town in Chouteau County, Montana, United States. Founded circa 1885, it is located at 47°32′30″N 110°17′03″W (47.5416396, -110.2840931), at an altitude of 3,123 feet (952 m). For nearly thirty years Lonetree possessed a post office, which was opened under the name of Steele on March 9, 1888; its name was changed to Lonetree on May 15, 1914. It bore this name for less than a year before closing on March 31, 1915.

The entire community of Lonetree was added to the National Register of Historic Places on September 11, 1980.
