= Gold Butte National Monument =

Protected natural area in the U.S. state of Nevada

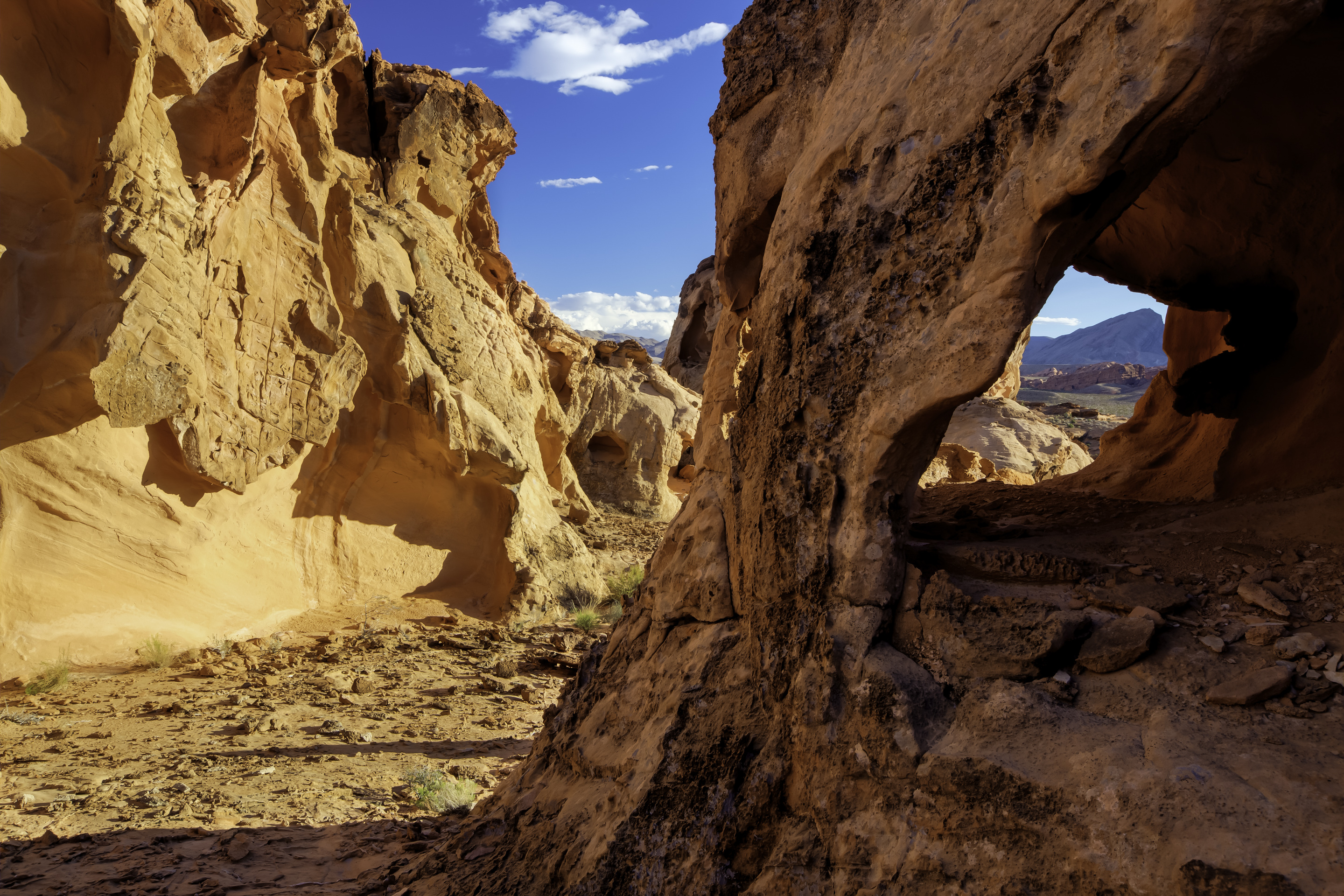
- Rock formations in Gold Butte National Monument

- Location within Nevada Location within the United States
- Interactive map of Gold Butte National Monument
- Location: Nevada, United States
- Nearest city: Mesquite, Nevada
- Coordinates: 36°17′3″N 114°12′4″W
- Area: 296,937 acres (120,166 ha)
- Established: December 28, 2016
- Website: https://www.blm.gov/programs/national-conservation-lands/nevada/gold-butte

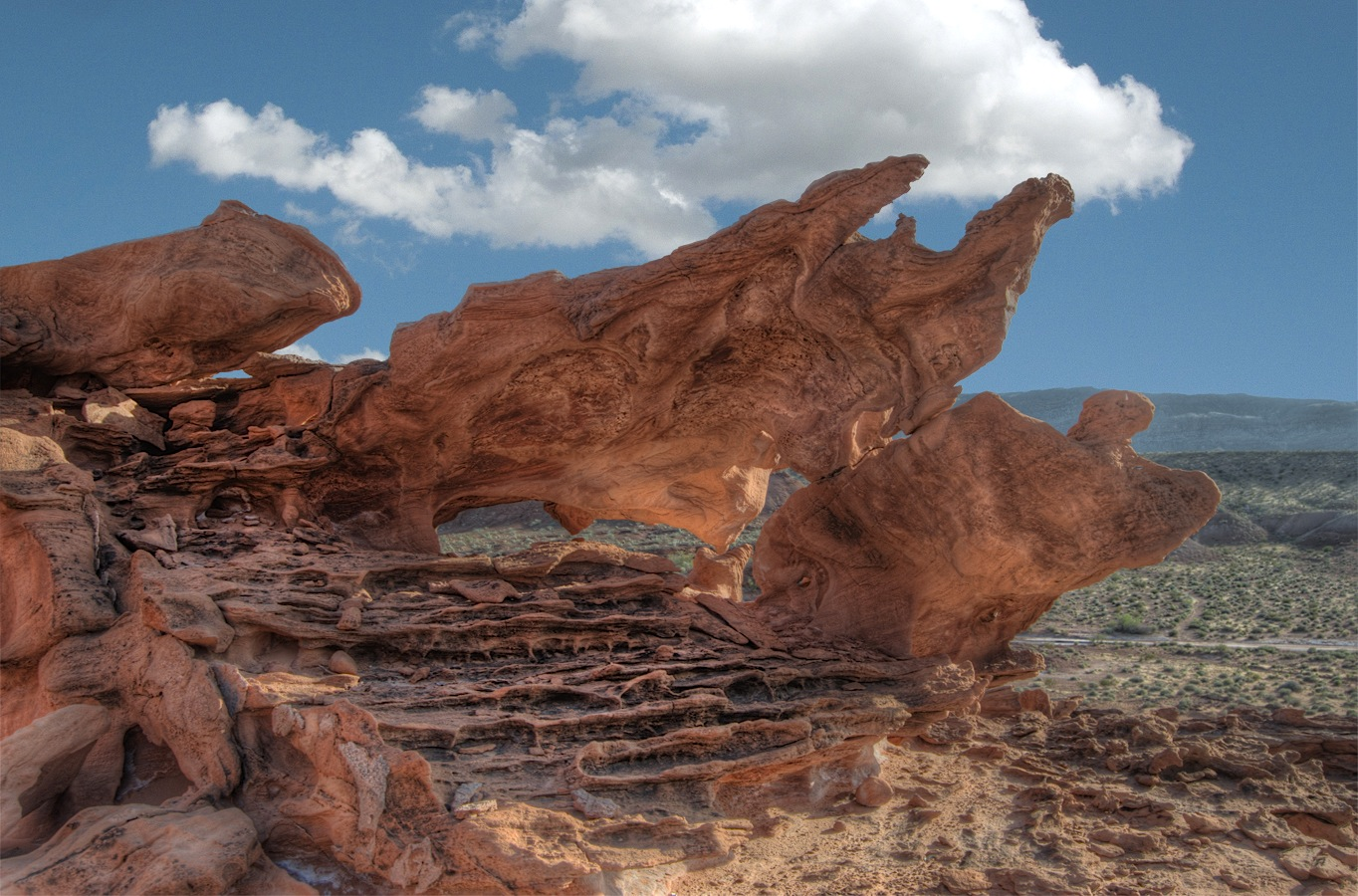
Little Finland rock formation

Gold Butte National Monument is a United States national monument located in Clark County, Nevada, northeast of Las Vegas and south of Mesquite and Bunkerville. The monument protects nearly 300,000 acres of desert landscapes featuring a wide array of natural and cultural resources, including rock art, sandstone towers, and important wildlife habitat for species including the Mojave Desert tortoise (a threatened species), bighorn sheep, and mountain lion. The area also protects historic ranching and mining sites such as the ghost town of Gold Butte, although little but mine openings, cement foundations, and a few pieces of rusting equipment remains. The monument is managed by the Bureau of Land Management.

== Resources and management ==
Gold Butte National Monument, southeastern Nevada

The monument consists of 296,937 acres (120,166 ha). The Gold Butte National Monument fills a gap between Lake Mead National Recreation Area and Grand Canyon-Parashant National Monument, creating a continuous swath of conserved land and establishing a wildlife corridor. Significant wildlife within the borders of the park include Mojave Desert tortoise (a threatened species), bighorn sheep, and mountain lion, as well as Gambel's quail and chukar partridge. Important cultural and natural resources within the monument include rock art and sandstone formations. Within the park, "weather-chiseled red sandstone is incised with ancient rock art, and the remains of rock shelters and hearths, agave roasting pits and projectile points" may be found.

Prior to the area's designation as a national monument, Gold Butte suffered "an increasing level of damage near historic and cultural sites"; an August 2016 report by Friends of Gold Butte reported "dismantled historic corrals and fences, felled Joshua trees and petroglyphs peppered with bullet holes."

As stated in the presidential proclamation creating the monument, the area remains open for recreation, including hiking, hunting, horseback riding, camping, picnicking, off-highway driving and bicycling on designated roads and trails, sightseeing, the gathering of minerals and other materials important to native peoples who have lived on this lands for thousands of years, and other recreational uses. The area is now closed to industrial development, ensuring that the land is available for recreation. In 1998, Clark County bought out the area's grazing permits and retired them; no new permits will be issued. The monument will permit development and maintenance of existing water rights and transportation infrastructure, but prohibits future claims.

== Designation of monument ==
President Barack Obama designated the monument on December 28, 2016, using his powers under the Antiquities Act, after a two-year campaign by local conservation groups, Nevada and Clark County lawmakers and the Moapa Band of Paiute Indians. The designation came on the same day as the designation of Bears Ears National Monument. U.S. Representative Dina Titus and outgoing U.S. Senator Harry Reid, as well as the Las Vegas Paiute Tribe, were also strong supporters of the monument's designation.

Some congressional Republicans, along with former Nevada Attorney General Adam Laxalt, have expressed opposition to the monument designation, and have called for it to be revoked by Congress.

== Wilderness ==
Two wilderness areas are located within the monument: Lime Canyon and Jumbo Springs. The monument also includes two areas managed like wilderness: the Million Hills Wilderness Study Area and the Virgin Peak Instant Study Area.

== See also ==
- List of national monuments of the United States
- Little Finland, scenic redrock formations within the GBNM
