= Terry Badlands WSA =

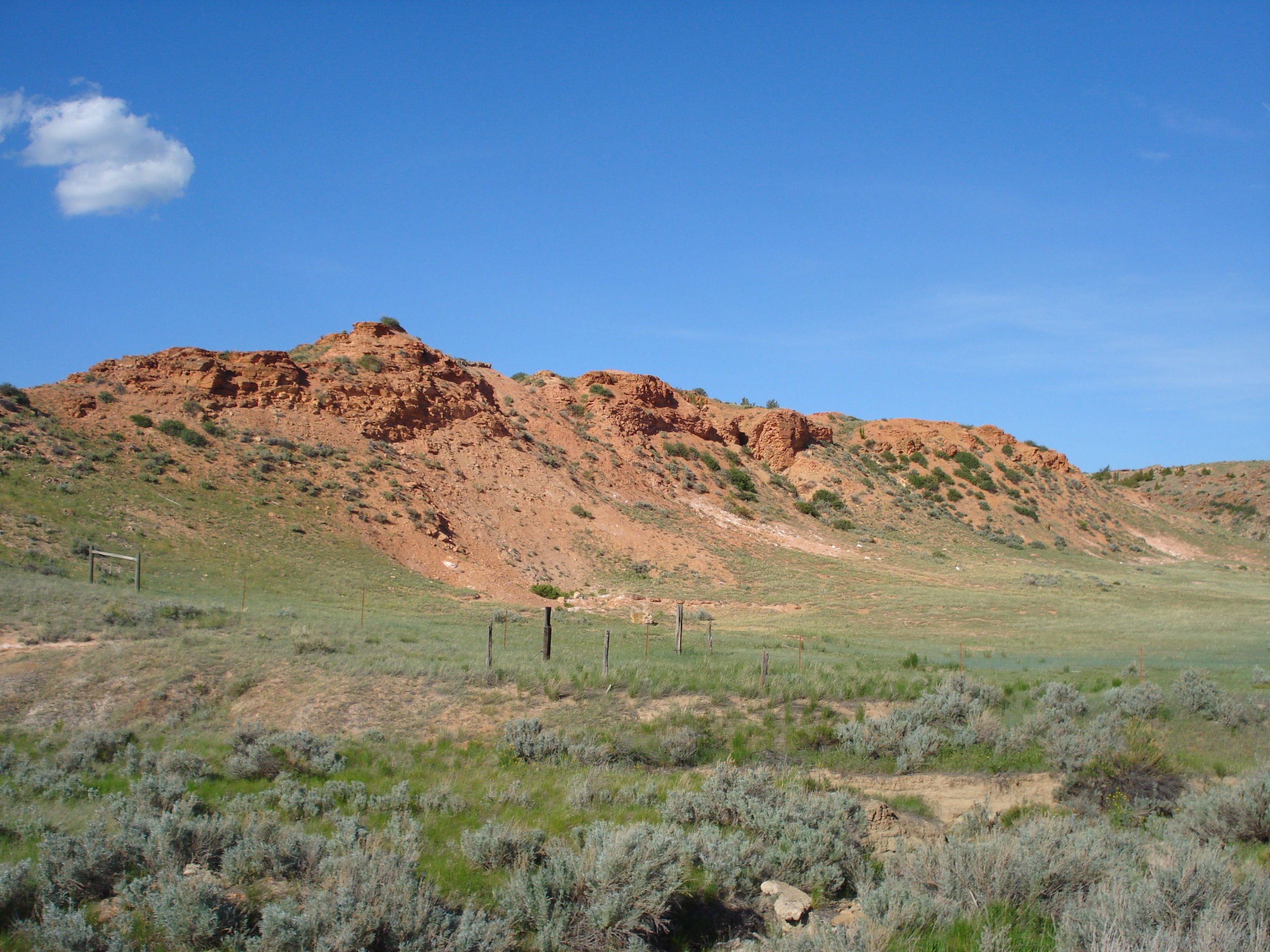
- Ridgeline in the Terry Badlands WSA

- Location within Montana Location within the United States
- Location: Prairie County, Montana, USA
- Nearest city: Terry, MT
- Coordinates: 46°49′0″N 105°19′0″W
- Governing body: Bureau of Land Management

The Terry Badlands WSA (also Terry Badlands) is a designated Wilderness Study Area by the Bureau of Land Management. It is located three miles north of the township of Terry, Montana.

It is part of the National Landscape Conservation System.

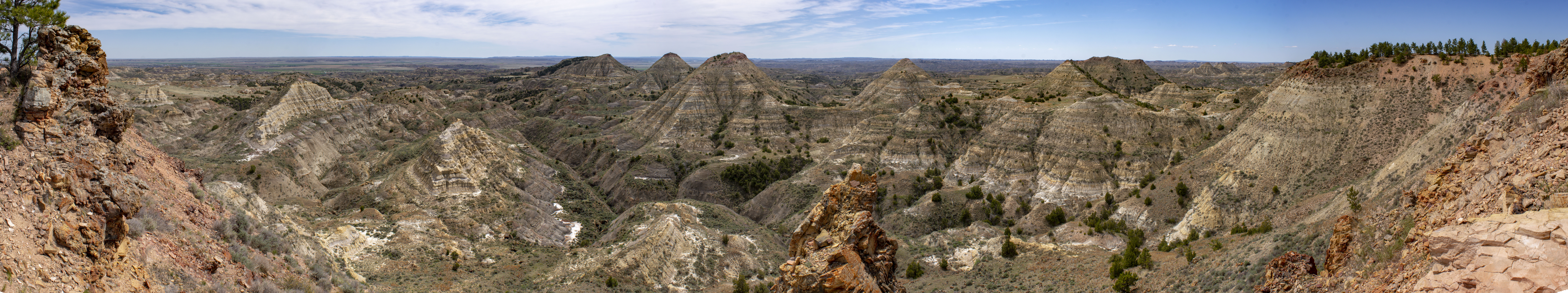
Terry Badlands WSA

== See also ==
- List of U.S. Wilderness Areas
- Wilderness Act
