= Lime Canyon Wilderness =

Wilderness area in Nevada, United States

Coordinates: 36.36°N 114.28°W

Lime Canyon Wilderness is a unit of the National Wilderness Preservation System located in eastern Nevada, United States, within the Gold Butte National Monument. The 23,710-acre (9,600 ha) wilderness area is administered by the Bureau of Land Management, and was designated in 2002 to protect roadless, undeveloped mountains bordering Lake Mead National Recreation Area.
