= Donna Lucey =

Donna Lucey is the author of the book Photographing Montana 1894-1928: The Life and Work of Evelyn Cameron (1990), a biography and collection of photographs from frontier photographer Evelyn Cameron. Lucey has been an editor at Time-Life Books and Look magazine, and has received two grants from the National Endowment for the Humanities for her work on Photographing Montana. She lives with her husband Henry Wiencek and their son in Charlottesville, Virginia.
