= Gold Butte, Nevada =

Ghost town in Nevada, United States

Coordinates: 36.281°N 114.201°W

This map shows the incorporated and unincorporated areas in Clark County. Gold Butte is the name for both a mountain peak and nearby ghost town in the eastern hook of Clark County.

Gold Butte is the name of a ghost town and nearby mountain peak in Clark County, Nevada. Both are protected as part of the Gold Butte National Monument, managed by the Bureau of Land Management. Gold Butte, the mountain, is 5,013 feet (1,528 m) high and rises 1,280 feet (390 m) above the town of Gold Butte. This peak lies within the Virgin Mountains and its name apparently refers to the Gold Butte Mining District.

== Geology ==
The bedrock of the landscape around Gold Butte (the butte) and nearby Bonelli Peak consist of gray, Proterozoic, porphyritic perthite-quartz-biotite granites and quartz monzonites that are also classified as rapakivi granite. These granites, which are collectively called the Gold Butte Granite, intrude garnet-cordierite-sillimanite and hornblende gneisses, migmatites, and older granites, pyroxenites, and hornblendites. East of Gold Butte, these Proterozoic medium-to high-grade metamorphic and plutonic rocks are unconformably overlain by 3 to 4 kilometers (1.9 to 2.5 mi) of steeply east-dipping Paleozoic sedimentary rocks. Together, these plutonic, metamorphic, and sedimentary strata comprise a fault-bounded segment of crust known as the Gold Butte Block. The landscapes, of which Gold Butte is a part, within Gold Butte block represents the deeply eroded footwall of a Miocene detachment fault that provides a continuous outcrop of a section of the upper Earth's crust that is approximately 24 to 25 kilometers (15 to 16 mi) thick. Thus, Gold Butte lies near the base of possibly the longest continuously exposed section of the Earth's crust in the southwestern United States. Fryxell and Duebendorfer argued that the strata comprising Frenchman Mountain originated as the hanging wall that originally overlied the now tectonically exhumed Gold Butte block. It was during the Miocene, that these strata were translated to their present position by movement along detachment and strike-slip faults.

== History ==
Gold Butte, Nevada is part of the Gold Butte mining district, which includes the territory south of Gold Butte lying between the Nevada-Arizona state line to the east and the Virgin River (now Lake Mead) to the west. Daniel Bonelli discovered mica in this area in 1873. Gold was discovered here in 1905. There was a rush of people to Gold Butte from 1905 to 1906. The settlement contained a post office, hotel, livery stable, store and homes.

The total mining production from the Gold Butte district was $75,000. There was prospecting and small-scale mining for gold, mica, magnesite, copper and zinc. No significant deposits were found. By December 1910, most mining had completely halted and the town was abandoned.

Little remains today at the site: a couple of foundations, two graves, and several old mine shafts.

== The Bundy standoff ==
The Bundy standoff, which pertains in part to the Gold Butte area, was caused in spring 2014 as the result of a 20-year-old land use disagreement between the Bureau of Land Management and Cliven Bundy, a local rancher.

United States Senator from Nevada Harry Reid (1939-2021), along with local business leaders and conservation groups, campaigned to make Gold Butte and the surrounding area into National Conservation Area. On December 28, 2016, President Barack Obama established Gold Butte National Monument, protecting the public lands surrounding Gold Butte.

== See also ==
- Little Finland
