= Eastern Montana =

Loosely defined region of Montana, U.S.

Eastern Montana is a loosely defined region of Montana. Some definitions are more or less inclusive than others, ranging from the most inclusive, which would include the entire part of the state east of the Continental Divide, to the least inclusive, which places the beginning of "eastern" Montana roughly at or even east of Billings, Montana. The areas of Montana lying just east of the Continental Divide are often called Central Montana. A widely accepted definition of Eastern Montana is that it encompasses the eastern third of the state.

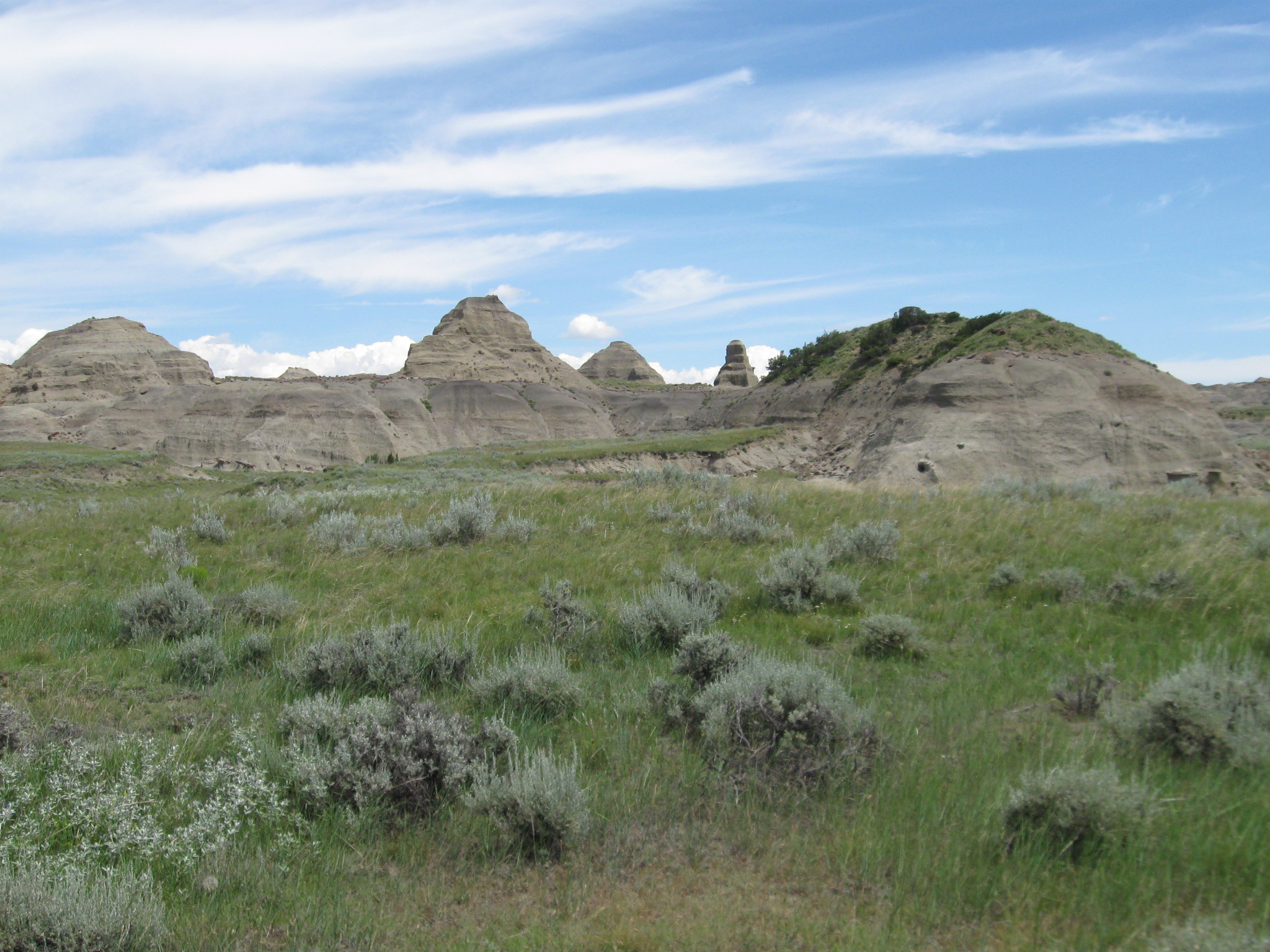
Sand Arroyo Badlands

Parts of Eastern Montana are affected by the economic boom in the Bakken formation, the largest oil discovery in U.S. history.

== History ==
The plains of eastern Montana were historically populated by Plains Indian tribes such as the Sioux, Blackfeet and Crow.

By the late 19th century, people of European descent set up homesteads in the region, and the Native Americans were mostly confined to Indian reservations as they were throughout Montana and the west. To this day, Eastern Montana has a proud Native American population.

Eastern Montana was the location of the Battle of the Little Bighorn.

Fort Peck Dam near Glasgow, Montana was a major project of the Public Works Administration, part of the New Deal. Construction of Fort Peck Dam started in 1933, and at its peak in July 1936 employed 10,546 workers. The dam, named for a 19th-century trading post, was completed in 1940, and began generating electricity in July 1943.

== Geography, biomes and climate ==
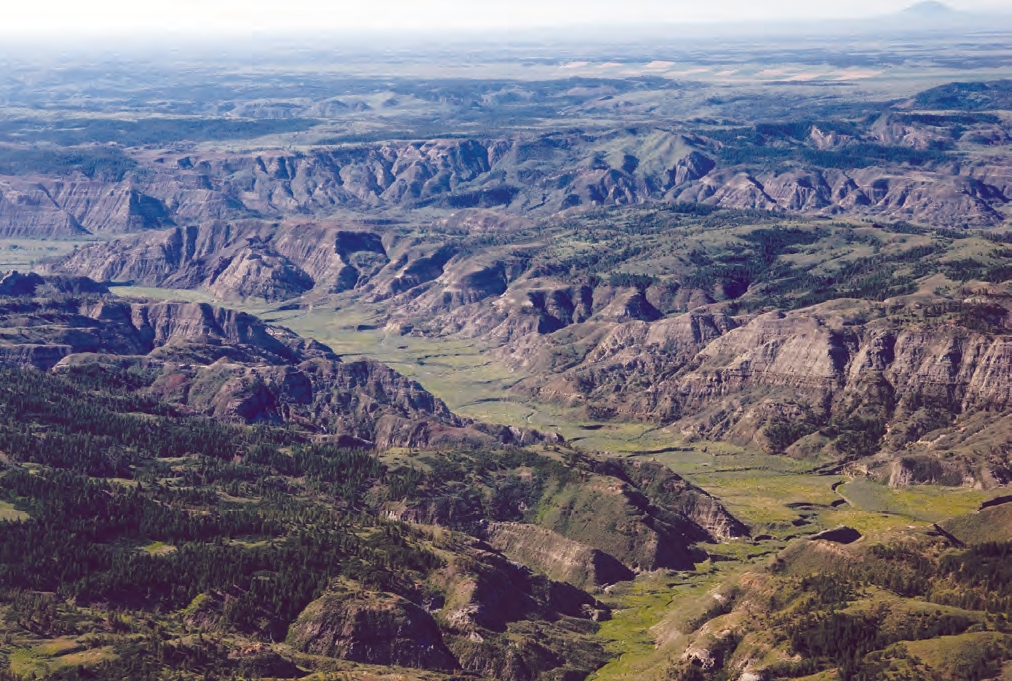
Charles M Russell National Wildlife Refuge - Montana - 2010

Eastern Montana has a semi-arid steppe climate with low precipitation that is to some extent countered by low evaporation rates. Typical precipitation is 10 to 20 inches (254.0 to 508.0 mm) mostly in the form of summer thunderstorms and snow, which can fall at any time of the year. Summers are short but hot and winters are long, cold and extremely variable. During some winters, such as 1925–26, 1930–31, 1960–61 and 1991–92, chinook winds descending from the Rockies cause frequent mild spells of 35 to 60 °F (1.7 to 15.6 °C) lasting up to several weeks. In contrast, other winters such as 1916–17, 1935–36, 1968–69 and 1978–79 see the westerly flow move further south and in this absence of chinooks, temperatures can stay below 0 °F or −17.8 °C for weeks at a time.

Though the prairie landscape of eastern Montana has traditionally been considered a part of the Great Plains, a recent (early 2010s) study has shown that, at least in some ways, the biomes of Eastern Montana have more in common and share more species with the Intermountain West scrub steppes and the Palouse of Eastern Washington than they have with the neighboring plains of The Dakotas. Some parts of eastern Montana, in areas most prone to drying chinooks, have near-desert conditions and scrub rather than grassland. Eastern Montana also has breaks and highlands that are widely forested, such as the Custer National Forest and areas around Fort Peck Lake, in contrast to the almost completely treeless plains of the Midwest.

== Culture ==
Eastern Montana was mostly colonized by German and Scandinavian, especially Norwegian, immigrants.

== Cities in eastern Montana ==
- Billings, Montana
- Baker, Montana
- Circle, Montana
- Colstrip, Montana
- Glasgow, Montana
- Glendive, Montana
- Jordan, Montana
- Malta, Montana
- Miles City, Montana
- Plentywood, Montana
- Poplar, Montana
- Sidney, Montana
- Scobey, Montana
- Terry, Montana
- Wibaux, Montana
- Wolf Point, Montana
