= Jumbo Springs Wilderness =

Wilderness area in Nevada

- IUCN category Ib (wilderness area)
- Location within the United States
- Location: Clark County, Nevada, USA
- Coordinates: 36°10′33.28″N 114°10′0.26″W
- Area: 4,631 acres (18.74 km^{2})
- Established: 2002
- Governing body: Bureau of Land Management

Jumbo Springs Wilderness is a 4,631 acre (1,874 ha) wilderness area located in Southern Nevada. Located 50 miles (81 km) east of Las Vegas, the site connects to both the southern and eastern sides of Lake Mead. Jumbo Springs Wilderness was designated as a wilderness area in 2002 and is under the management of the Bureau of Land Management.

== Geography ==
Despite its small size, Jumbo Springs Wilderness contains a diverse terrain range that is reflected in the geological structures that can be observed, from Precambrian metamorphic rocks to granitic domes and boulders. Animals native to the environment include coyotes, pocket gophers, and white-tailed antelope squirrels. Plants such as Nevada jointfir, cryptobiotic crusts, and buckhorn cholla.

== See also ==
- List of wilderness areas in the United States
