= San Antonio Hot Springs =

Thermal spring in New Mexico

- Murray Spring
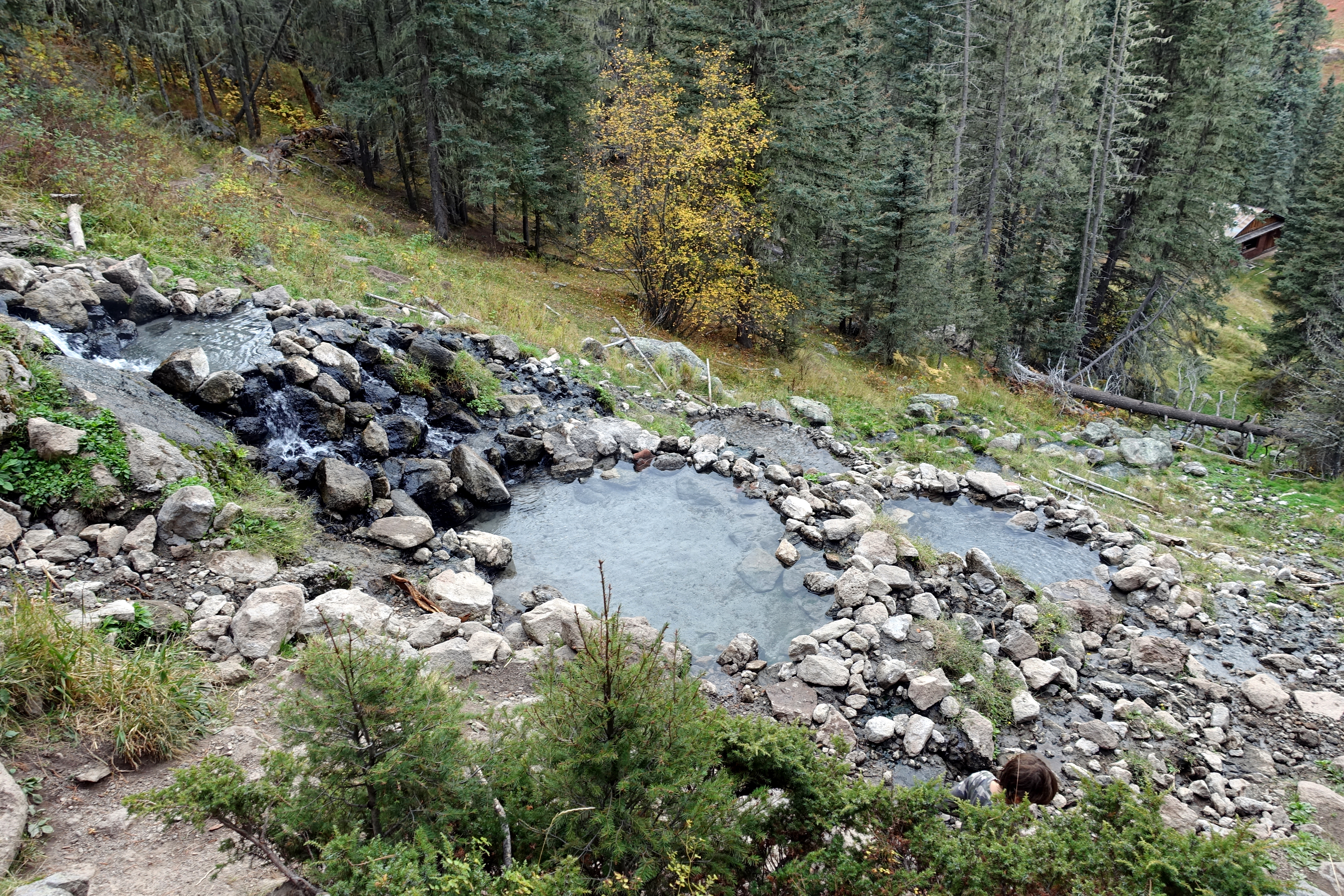
- Interactive map of San Antonio Hot Springs
- Location: Santa Fe National Forest, Northern New Mexico
- Coordinates: 35°56′17″N 106°38′46″W
- Elevation: 8,400 ft (2,600 m)
- Type: geothermal
- Discharge: 150 gallons per minute
- Temperature: 129 °F (54 °C)

San Antonio Hot Springs are a group of geothermal springs located in the Santa Fe National Forest in Northern New Mexico.

== Description ==
The hot spring water emerges from several sources on a steep hillside, and flows into several primitive, rock lined soaking pools of different temperatures. In the 1930s, the springs were bolstered to sustain a regular flow, and the rock pools were built by the Civilian Conservation Corps (CCC). The spring has also been known as Murray Spring. The hot water discharges from fractures in rhyolite porphyry igneous rock containing 10% quartz, 10% feldspar and 15% sanidine.

== Location ==
The hot springs are located in the Santa Fe National Forest, 12 miles North of Jemez Springs. Nearby hot springs include Giggling Hot Springs, Jemez Springs, McCauley Hot Springs, the Soda Dam, and Spence Hot Springs. The springs are located off of Forest Road 176. They are reached by a short but steep hike up the hill. The springs are at 8,400 feet in elevation.

== Water profile ==
The water emerges from the source at 129 °F / 54 °C. As the water flows downhill it cools to various temperatures; in each subsequent downhill pool the water becomes cooler. The uppermost soaking pool is approximately 105 °F. The springs discharge at 150 gallons per minute.

== See also ==
- List of hot springs in the United States
