= McCauley Hot Springs =

Thermal spring

- McCauley Warm Springs; Battleship Rock Hot Spring
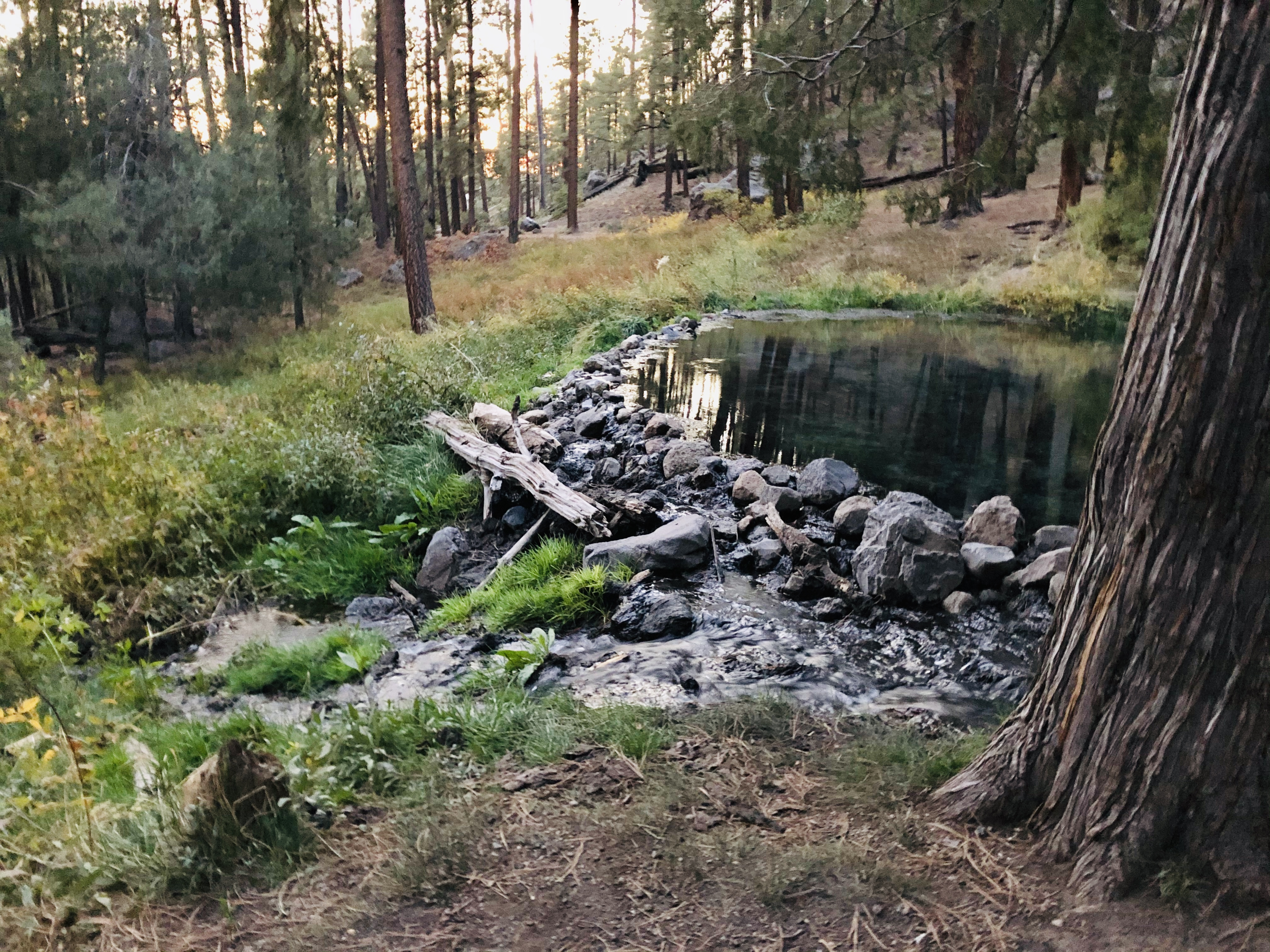
- Main soaking pool at McCauley hot springs
- Interactive map of McCauley Hot Springs
- Location: North of Jemez Springs near the Battleship Rock area
- Coordinates: 35°49′12″N 106°37′37″W
- Elevation: 7,300 feet (2,200 m)
- Type: geothermal, volcanic
- Temperature: 99 °F (37 °C)

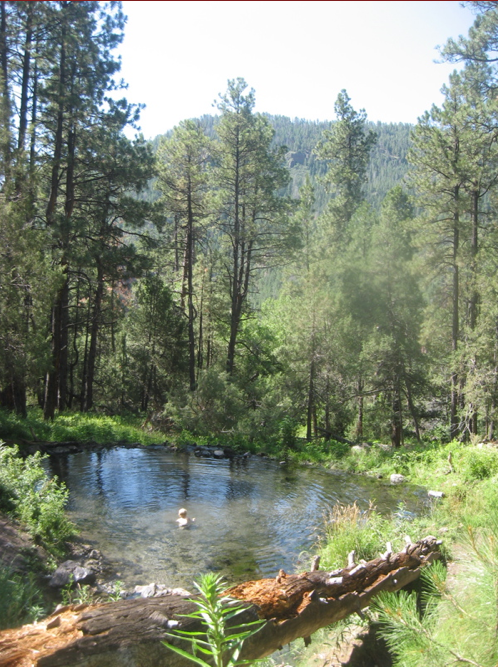
McCauley Hot Springs

McCauley Hot Springs, also known as McCauley Warm Springs and Battleship Rock Hot Springs, is a thermal spring in the Santa Fe National Forest, near the Jemez Springs area of Northern New Mexico.

== Description ==
McCauley Hot Springs is a large, shallow warm spring with a primitive rock-lined, gravel-bottomed soaking pool in the Santa Fe National Forest. The spring water cascades into a number of smaller and deeper soaking pools in a clearing in the forest. The rock dam pool was constructed by the Civilian Conservation Corps. The spring pools are surrounded by ponderosa pines.

Downhill from the main soaking area is a three-foot-deep rock and log-lined pool. Fifty more feet downhill and across a log and rock footbridge, are two additional warm soaking pools. From there, the water continues to flow downhill to another soaking pool that is between four and five feet deep. As the water cascades downhill the temperature of the spring water cools.

The ruins of the pre-colonial Hot Springs Pueblo is located close to the site.

== Water profile ==
The warm mineral water emerges from the ground at 99 °F / 37 °C, and cools to between 85 and 90° as it flows into the smaller pools.

== Location ==
The hot spring is located in the Jemez Springs area, north of the Soda Dam and south of Spence hot spring. It is part of a system of hot springs on the edge of the Valles Caldera, a dormant volcanic crater. The hike to the springs is 4 miles (6.4 km) on a mildly strenuous, but well-maintained trail. The trailhead to the spring is located at the Battleship Rock campground. This hot spring is not accessible during winter.

== See also ==
- List of hot springs in the United States
- List of hot springs in the world
