= Taos National Forest =

National Forest in New Mexico, US (1906–1908)

Taos National Forest was established as the Taos Forest Reserve by the U.S. Forest Service in New Mexico on November 7, 1906 with 233,200 acres (944 km^{2}). It became a National Forest on March 4, 1907. On July 1, 1908 the entire forest was combined with part of Jemez National Forest to create Carson National Forest and the name was discontinued.
