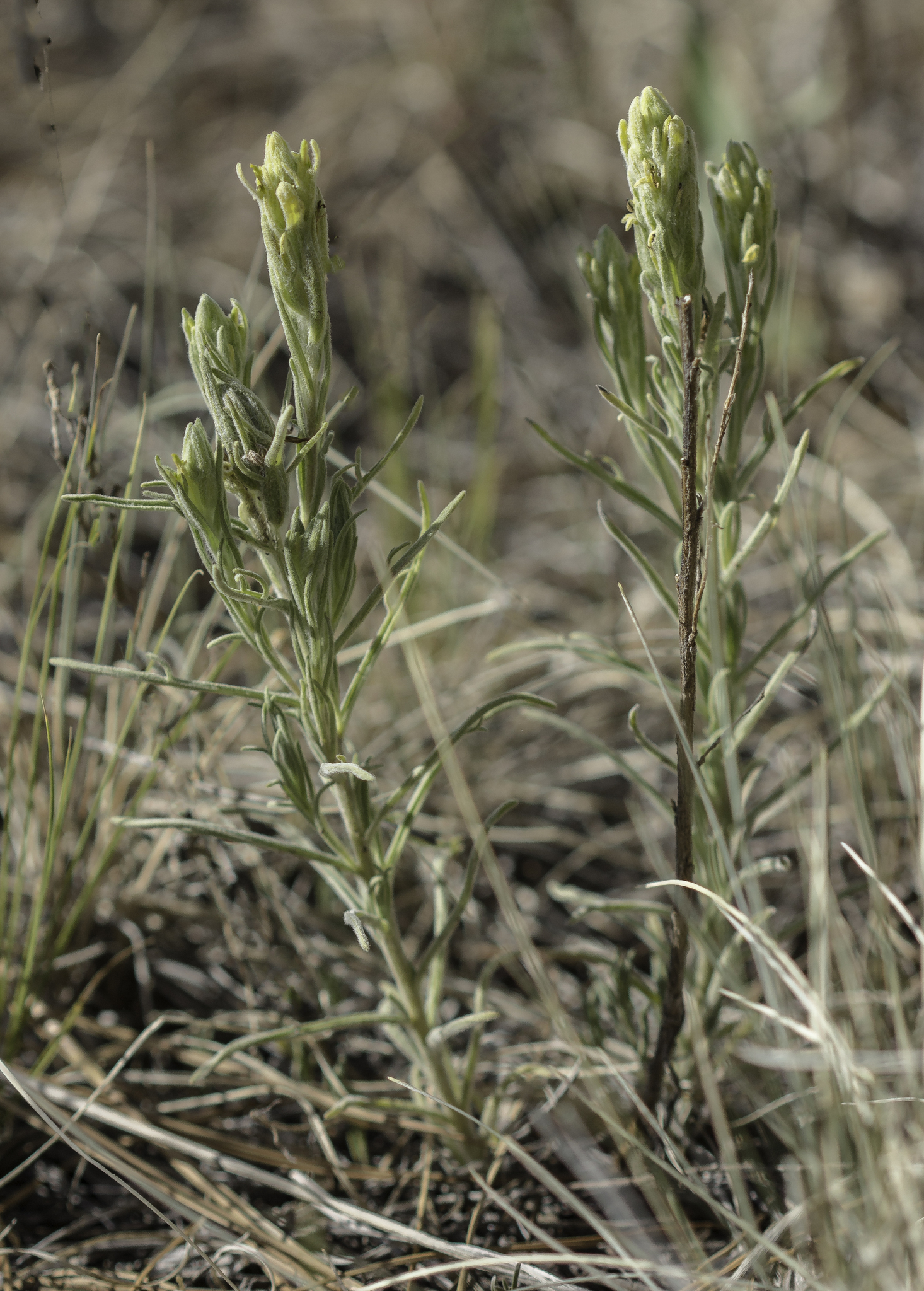
- Castilleja lineata flowering Santa Fe National Forest, New Mexico

Conservation status
- Apparently Secure (NatureServe)

Scientific classification
- Kingdom: Plantae
- Clade: Tracheophytes
- Clade: Angiosperms
- Clade: Eudicots
- Clade: Asterids
- Order: Lamiales
- Family: Orobanchaceae
- Genus: Castilleja
- Species: C. lineata

Binomial name
- Castilleja lineata Greene

= Castilleja lineata =

Species of plant in the paintbrush flower genus

Castilleja lineata, commonly known as marshmeadow paintbrush or linearlobe paintbrush, is an uncommon species that largely grows in the mountains of northern New Mexico, but is also found in small areas of neighboring Colorado and Arizona. It was not scientifically described until 1901 and is little studied.

== Description ==
Castilleja lineata is a perennial, herbaceous plant that reaches 10–40 centimeters in height at full size. The stems either grow straight upwards (erect) or somewhat outwards before curving to grow upwards (ascending) from a common central point. The stems are usually unbranched and are covered in very fine hairs, sometimes very heavily (pilose or woolly).

The leaves of Castilleja lineata are green in color, are not thick or fleshy, and have a smooth edge without teeth. Its leaves often have large lobes, three to seven total, but usually five or less. The surface of the leaves are strongly marked with parallel veins. The leaves are rolled inwards (involute) and will sometimes have wavy margins. Their shape varies from narrow and grass like (linear), a narrow rectangle with rounded corners (narrowly oblong), or like a thin spear head (narrowly lanceolate), and measure 1.3–5 centimeters long.

=== Flowering ===
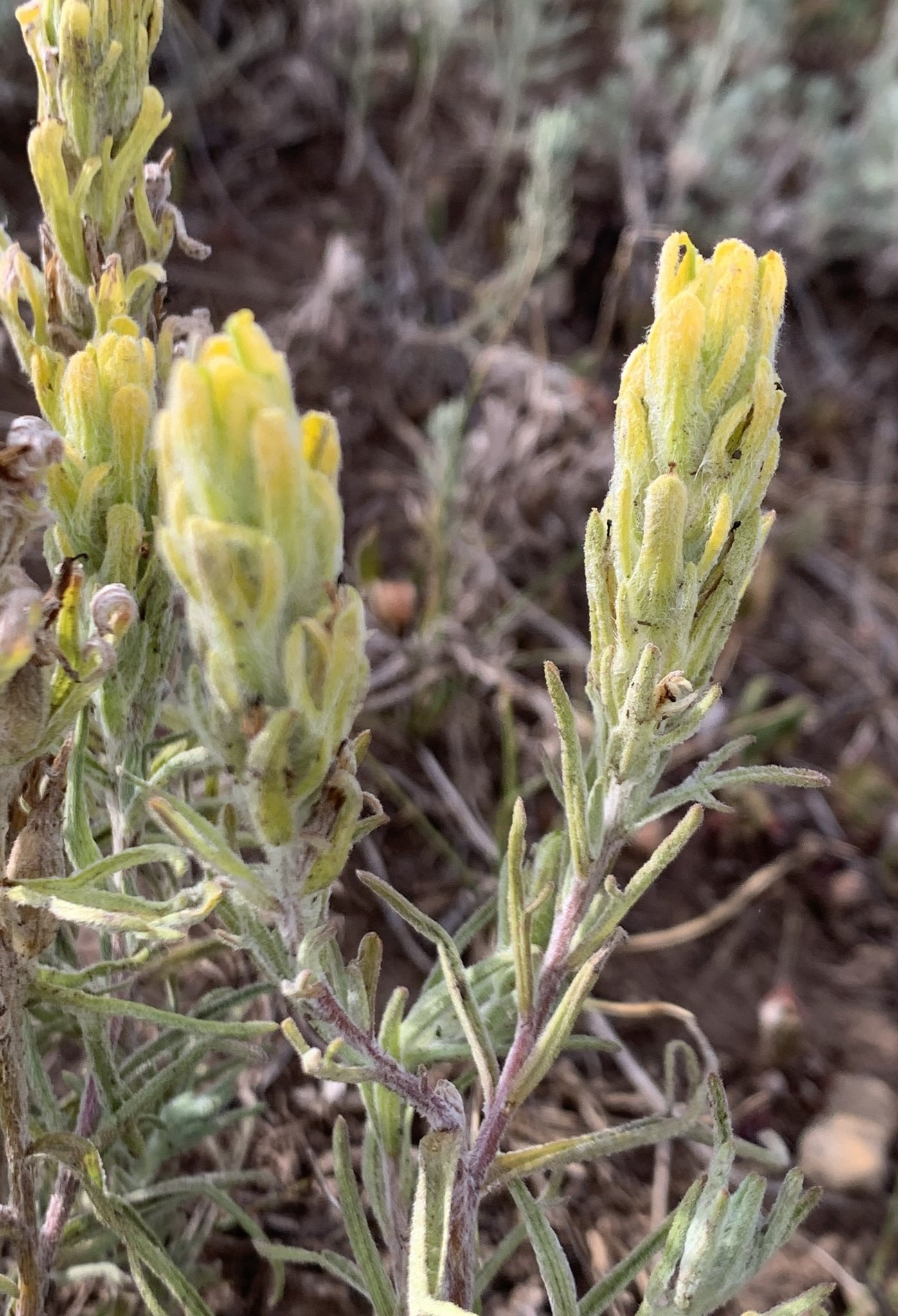
Flowering stem photographed in Colfax County, New Mexico

The bracts are the most noticeable part of the flowers and are pale-yellow to greenish in color. They may also be tinged with yellow-orange or yellow towards their ends while the base of the bracts are more green or yellow-green. The length of the bracts is 20–35 millimeters and they are densely covered with woolly hairs. The overall shape of the bracts varies from a narrow to broad spear head (lanceolate or narrow rectangle with rounded corners (narrowly oblong). Each bract usually has three lobes, but may also sometimes have five or seven, they may grow upwards or spread outwards and split the bracts near or just below the midpoint. The middle lobe is rounded at the end while the ends of the side lobes are more pointed. The overall length of the flowering stem is 5–22 centimeters and its width is 1–4.5 centimeters with many bracts and flowers.

The tube of the flower is hidden by the bracts. The surrounding sepals (the calyces) are similarly colored to the bracts and 15–20 millimeters long. The petals are partially fused into a tube that may be straight or slightly curved and is 14–22 millimeters long. Flowering may be in June, July, or August.

== Taxonomy ==
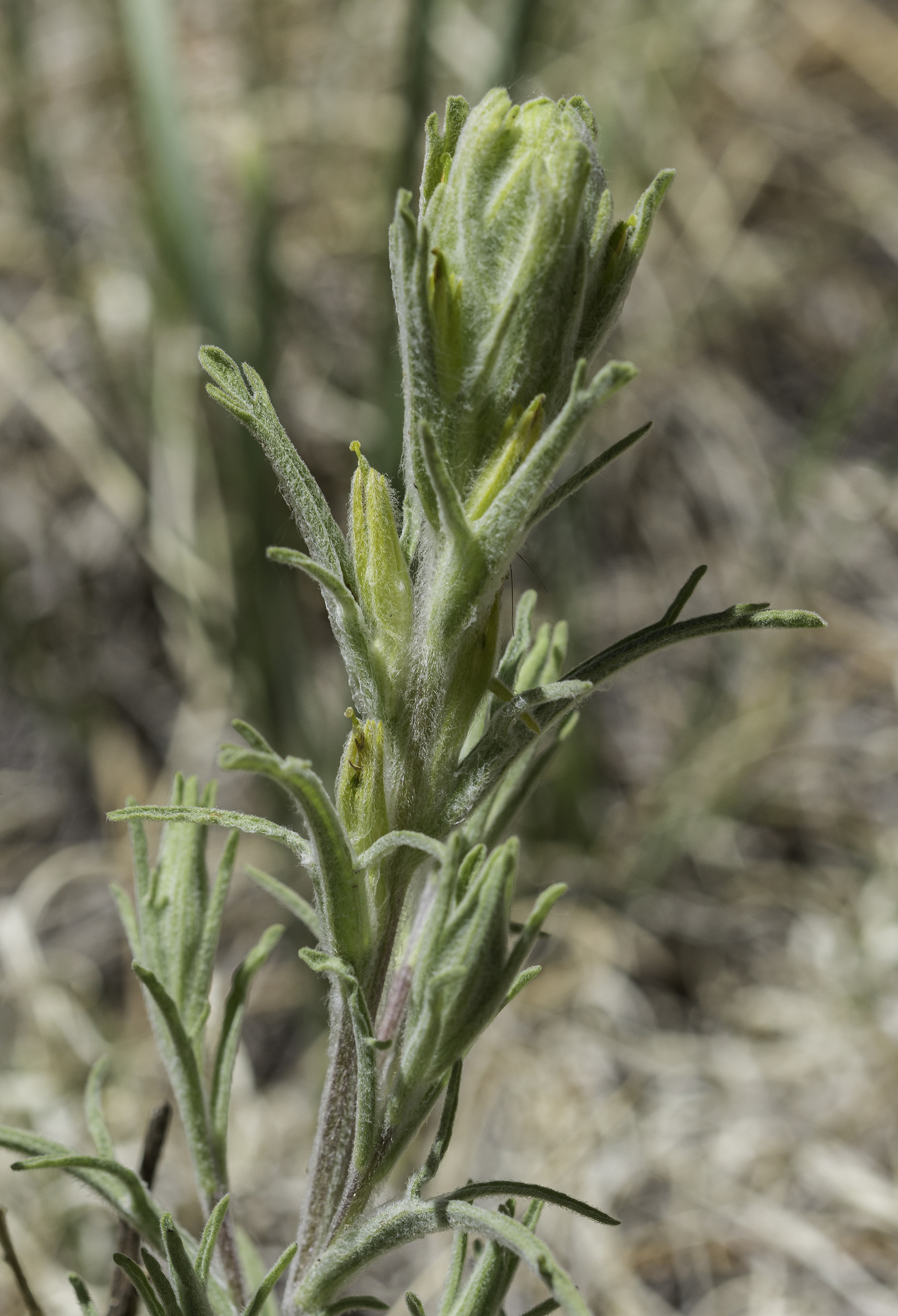
Flowering stem photographed in Santa Fe National Forest, New Mexico

Castilleja lineata was scientifically described by Edward Lee Greene in 1901 and has no subspecies or synonyms. The type specimen was collected on a moist slope near Pagosa Springs, Colorado.

=== Names ===
The species name, lineata, is botanical Latin meaning that it is marked with parallel veins because of the easily visible veins on each flower's bracts. In English it is variously known as "linearlobe paintbrush", "marshmeadow paintbrush", or marshmeadow Indian paintbrush.

== Range and habitat ==
Castilleja lineata grows in three western US states, Arizona, Colorado, and New Mexico. The majority of the range is in New Mexico, with the USDA Natural Resources Conservation Service PLANTS database listing as growing in four north western counties, Cibola, Rio Arriba, Sandoval, and Taos. In Colorado it is only found in two southern counties, Archuleta and Las Animas. To the west it only is found in Apache County, Arizona.

The species grows on moist to dry slopes, in meadows, forest openings, in the montane life zone to alpine tundra in the mountains. It can be found between 2100 and 3800 meters in elevation.

=== Conservation ===
Castilleja lineata is an uncommon species in its range. But it was evaluated by NatureServe as apparently secure (G4) in 2006. At the state level it was evaluated as apparently secure (S4) in New Mexico, imperiled (S2) in Colorado, and has not been evaluated in Arizona.
