= Carson National Forest =

National forest in New Mexico, United States

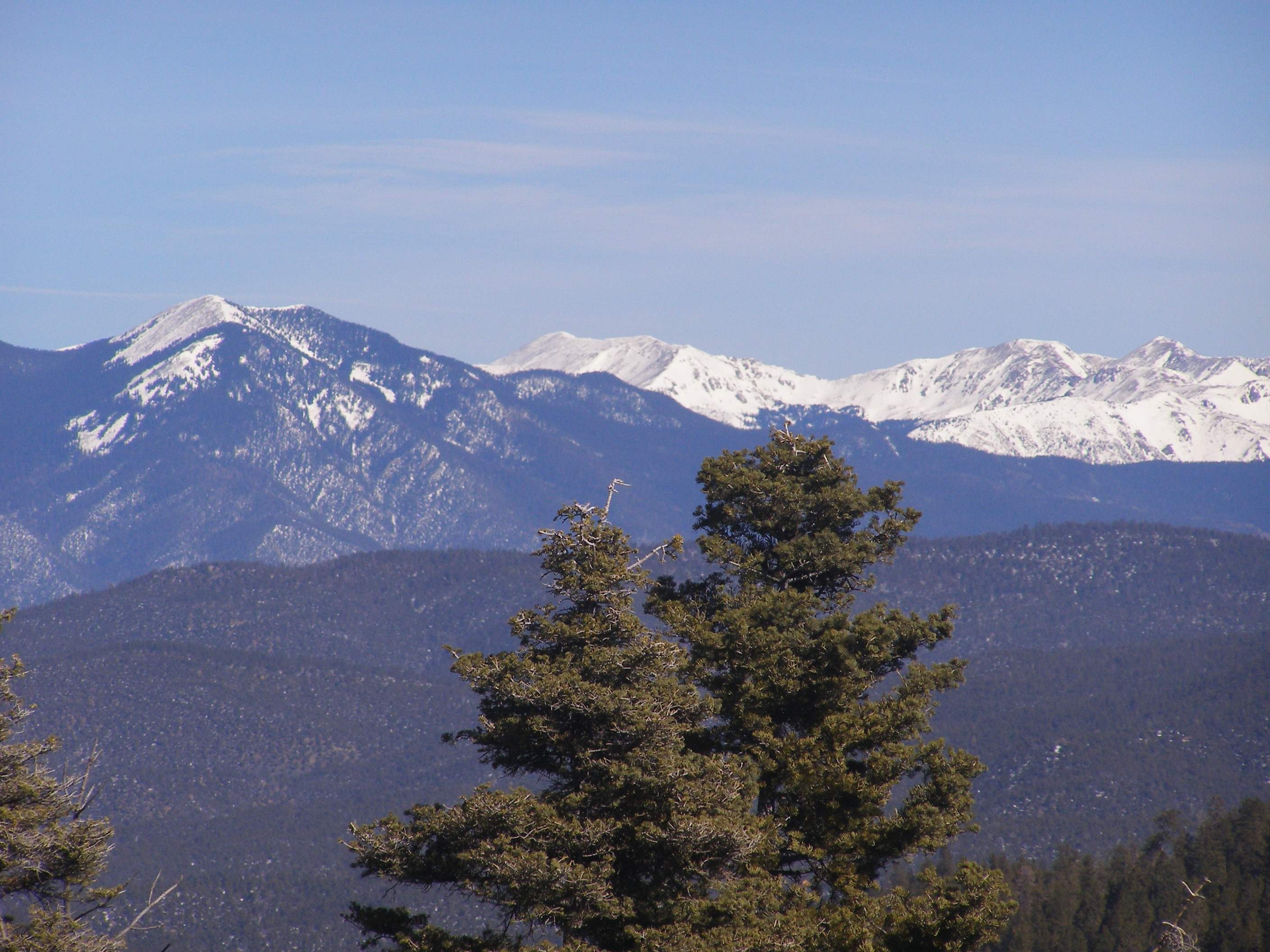
- Sangre de Cristo Mountains in Carson National Forest

- Location within the United States
- Location: New Mexico, United States
- Nearest city: Taos, NM
- Coordinates: 36.517222°N 106.066944°W
- Area: 1,391,674 acres (5,631.90 km^{2})
- Established: July 1, 1908
- Governing body: U.S. Forest Service
- Website: Carson National Forest

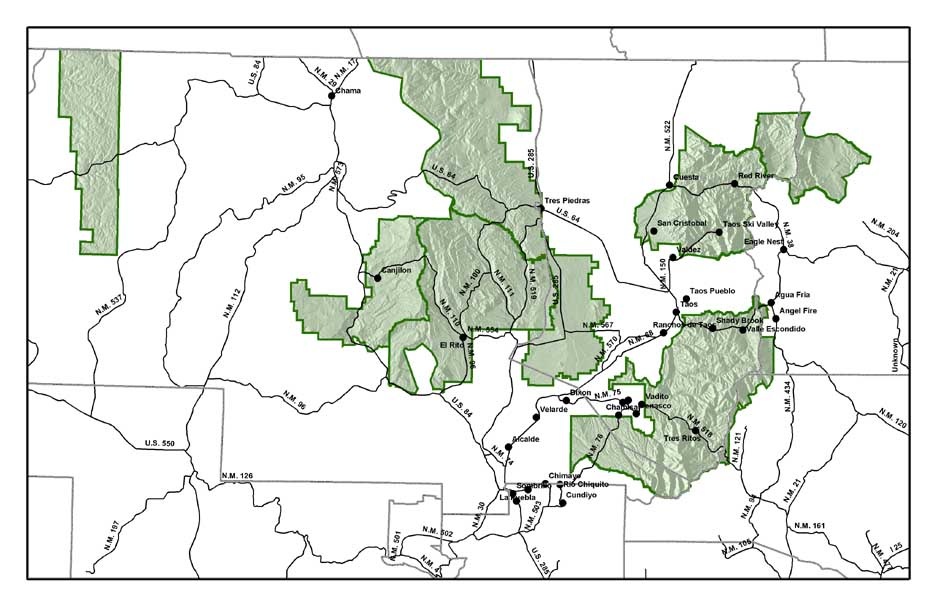
Map of Carson National Forest

Carson National Forest is a national forest in northern New Mexico, United States. It encompasses 6,070 square kilometers (1.5 million acres) and is administered by the United States Forest Service. The Forest Service's "mixed use" policy allows for its use for recreation, grazing, and resource extraction.

== Geography ==
The forest is disjunct with four separate areas managed by six ranger districts. On the east side in the Sangre de Cristo Mountains are two districts that are separated by the Taos Pueblo. The west side of the forest has three are conjoined districts in the San Juan Mountains, sandwiched between the Santa Fe and Rio Grande national forests, and another in the San Juan Basin.

The forest is located mainly in Rio Arriba (63.4% of acreage) and Taos (34.65%) counties, but smaller areas extend eastward into western Mora and Colfax counties.

Wheeler Peak, the highest mountain in New Mexico at 13,161 feet (4,011 m), is located in the National Forest.

=== Wilderness areas ===
Within the Carson National Forest are five designated and one proposed wilderness areas. Two of these are located mostly in neighboring Santa Fe National Forest (as indicated).

- Chama River Canyon Wilderness (mostly in Santa Fe NF)
- Columbine-Hondo Wilderness
- Cruces Basin Wilderness
- Latir Peak Wilderness
- Pecos Wilderness (mostly in Santa Fe NF)
- Wheeler Peak Wilderness

The forest's 2021 Land Management Plan has six recommended wilderness areas that meet the definitions of the Wilderness Act of 1964 and would be suitable additions to the system, which takes an act of Congress. Two areas are adjacent to Chama River Canyon Wilderness, two to Cruces Basin Wilderness, and one to Latir Peak Wilderness. 9,361 acres in the Valle Vidal area are also recommended.

=== Wild and scenic rivers ===
Two sections of rivers in the forest are included in the National Wild and Scenic Rivers System. Five miles of the Rio Grande River and 3.25 miles of the Red River were designated as part of the original Wild and Scenic Rivers Act in 1968. Both are managed by the Bureau of Land Management as part of the Rio Grande Wild and Scenic River.

The forest's 2021 land management plan identifies 51 river segments, totaling approximately 170 miles, as eligible for inclusion in the National Wild and Scenic Rivers System.

=== Ranger districts ===
The forest is administratively divided into six ranger districts with offices in local communities:

- Canjilon Ranger District (Canjilon), San Juan Mountains
- Camino Real Ranger District (Peñasco), Sangre de Cristo Mountains
- El Rito Ranger District (El Rito), San Juan Mountains
- Jicarilla Ranger District (Bloomfield), San Juan Basin
- Questa Ranger District (Questa), Sangre de Cristo Mountains
- Tres Piedras Ranger District (Tres Piedras), San Juan Mountains

Each district ranger reports to the forest supervisor, whose office is in Taos.

=== Highest peaks ===
Some of New Mexico's highest major summits are within the forest:

- Wheeler Peak (Wheeler Peak Wilderness), 13,167 ft, tallest peak
- Venado Peak (Latir Peak Wilderness), 12,739 ft, third tallest peak
- Gold Hill, (Columbine-Hondo Wilderness) 12,700 ft, fourth tallest peak
- Cerro Vista, 11,937 ft, ninth tallest peak
- San Antonio Mountain, 10,912 ft, 14th tallest peak

== Wildlife ==
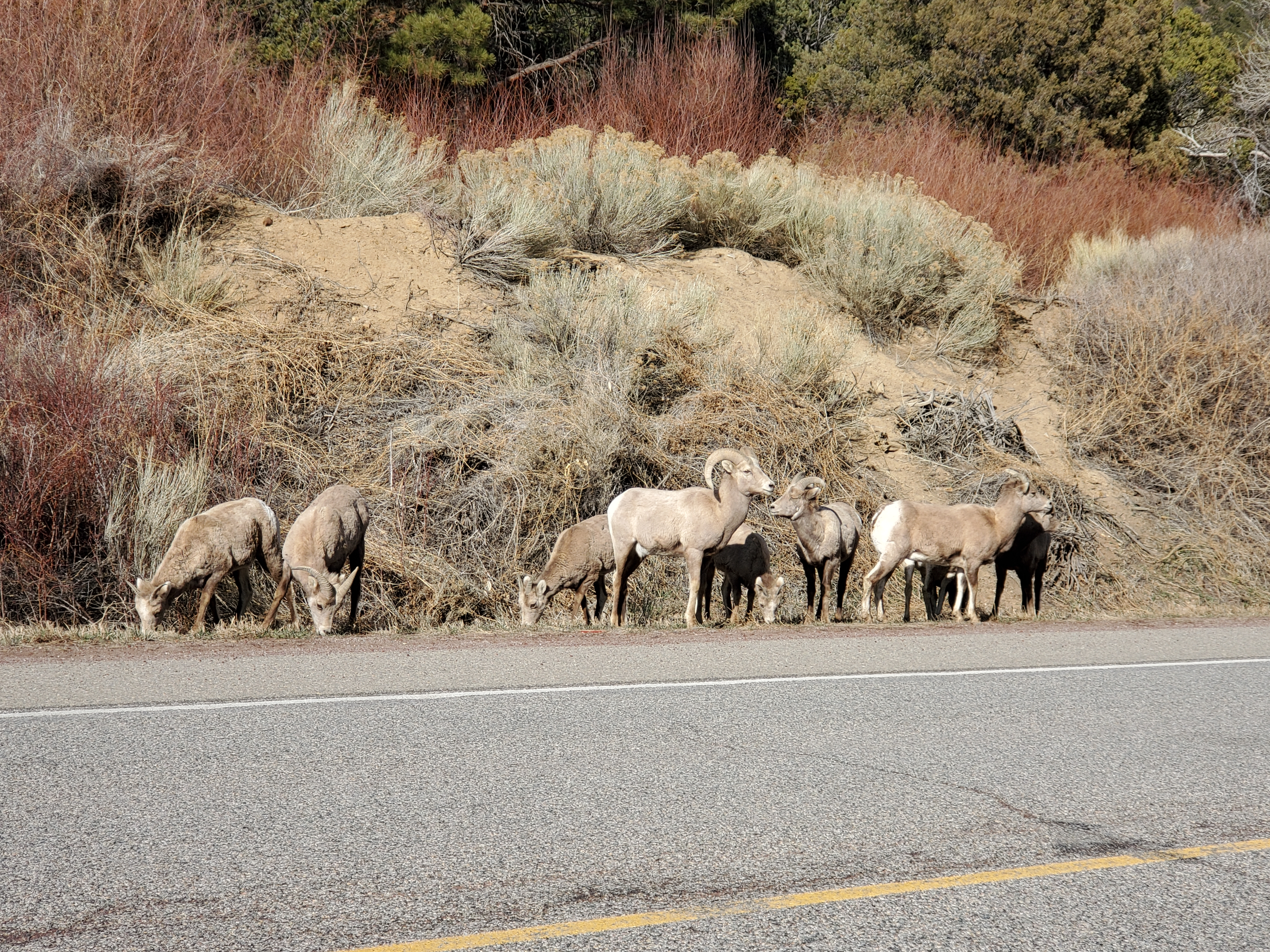
Bighorn sheep graze along a highway in Carson Nation Forest near Questa, March 2021

Big game animals roam this forest. They include mule deer, elk, pronghorn, black bears, coyotes, bobcats, foxes, cougars, and bighorn sheep. There are also many species of smaller mammals and songbirds. Forest personnel work closely with the State Game and Fish Department to provide the best wildlife habitat possible. Carson has four hundred miles of sparkling clean mountain streams and numerous lakes. Many of them are stocked with native trout by the Game and Fish Department.

== Recreation ==
The forest receives up to one million annual visitors, mainly for recreation purposes. Activities include hiking, camping, fishing, mountain biking, downhill and cross-country skiing, wildlife viewing, scenic touring, off-highway vehicle riding, and rock climbing. See El Rito Crags for rock climbing details.

There are approximately 600 miles of hiking trails, 85 miles of motorized trails, and 1,000 miles of forest roads.

=== National trails ===
Five trails that are fully or partially in the forest are included in the National Trails System.

- Columbine-Twining National Recreation Trail
- Continental Divide National Scenic Trail
- Jicarita Peak National Recreation Trail
- Old Spanish National Historic Trail
- South Boundary National Recreation Trail

=== Scenic Byways ===
The Enchanted Circle Scenic Byway is both a New Mexico Scenic Byway and National Forest Scenic Byway. It is an 84-mile loop that goes through the forest's Camino Real and Questa ranger districts and nearby towns, including Taos, Questa, Red River, Eagle Nest, and Angel Fire.

A portion of the 56-mile High Road to Taos, another state designated scenic byway, goes through the forest's Camino Real Ranger District. Heading north from Santa Fe, the byway travels through the forest on State Road 75 after Vadito, New Mexico, then goes through the Sipapu area before turning onto State Road 518. The byway leaves the forest before reaching Talpa, New Mexico.

=== Winter and summer resort areas ===
Four winter and summer resort developments where activities ranging from skiing to mountain biking have special use permits to operate on national forest land:

- Enchanted Forest Cross-Country Ski Area
- Taos Ski Valley
- Red River Ski and Summer Area
- Sipapu Ski and Summer Resort

== History ==
The forest was once inhabited by the Ancestral Pueblo people, who left ruins of adobe dwellings and other artifacts at an archaeological site now called Pot Creek Cultural Site. Some areas of the forest were formerly lands granted to settlers by the Spanish monarchy and the Mexican government. After the Mexican–American War, the national forest was established, and was named for American pioneer Kit Carson.

Carson National Forest was established with the merger of Taos National Forest and part of Jemez National Forest on July 1, 1908. The land in the National Forest largely consists of the former common lands of Spanish and American land grants of which the history of the Las Trampas Land Grant is illustrative.

Included in the merged lands was the land surrounding Blue Lake, an important cultural, religious site to the people of Taos Pueblo. In the early 20th century, Taos Pueblo petitioned the federal government to regain Blue Lake, but their requests were denied. Attempts to prevent Taos ceremonies at Blue Lake were included in the government's attempts to assimilate Indigenous peoples into mainstream American culture. The Department of Agriculture therefore denied requests to set aside land at Blue Lake for the Taos Pueblo to perform ceremonies, claiming that it was "foreign to the policies of the Department of Agriculture, when once some land has been set aside as a National Forest, to allow it to be withdrawn completely and donated to a private purpose."

In 1965, the Association on American Indian Affairs published a booklet called The Blue Lake Appeal in order to garner support for requests to return Blue Lake through the Indian Claims Commission (ICC). The ICC then concluded that Taos Pueblo's land had been illegally obtained and no proper amends had been made to rectify it, suggesting a monetary award as compensation. Taos Pueblo refused a monetary settlement, leading to a deliberation in Congress to return Blue Lake back to the tribe. When the bill was deadlocked in Congress, the Taos Pueblo brought their case to President Richard Nixon, who pushed their request through Congress in 1970, returning the Blue Lake to Taos Pueblo.

In October 1966, the Alianza Federal de Mercedes, an organization dedicated to the restoration of certain land grants entrenched in the 1848 Treaty of Guadalupe Hidalgo to descendants of then-Mexican citizens, occupied the Carson Forest's Echo Amphitheater in an attempt to create a land grant community. The occupants were evicted, after five days, for overstaying camping permits. In 1982, the forest grew by 405 square kilometers (100,000 acres) when the Pennzoil corporation donated the Valle Vidal Unit to the American people.

== Gallery ==
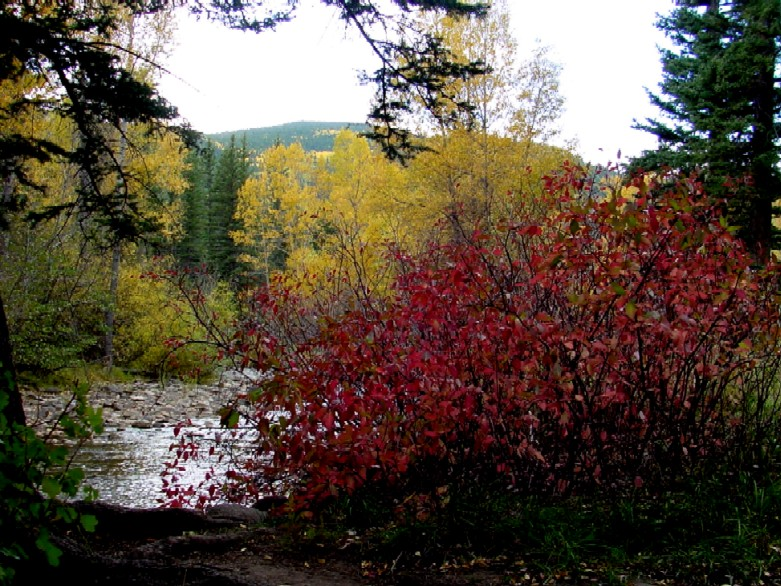
Fall colors near Tres Piedras, in the Carson National Forest

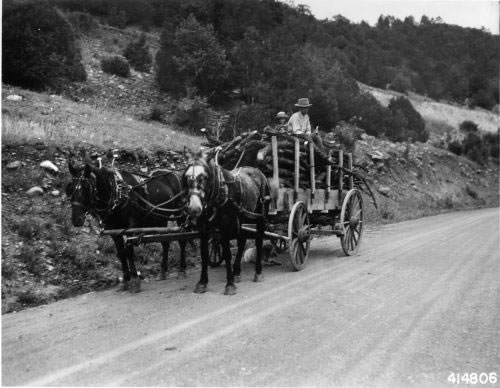
Wood hauler along the Rio Pueblo, 1941. An average rural family here would use about 20 loads like this per year for fuel wood

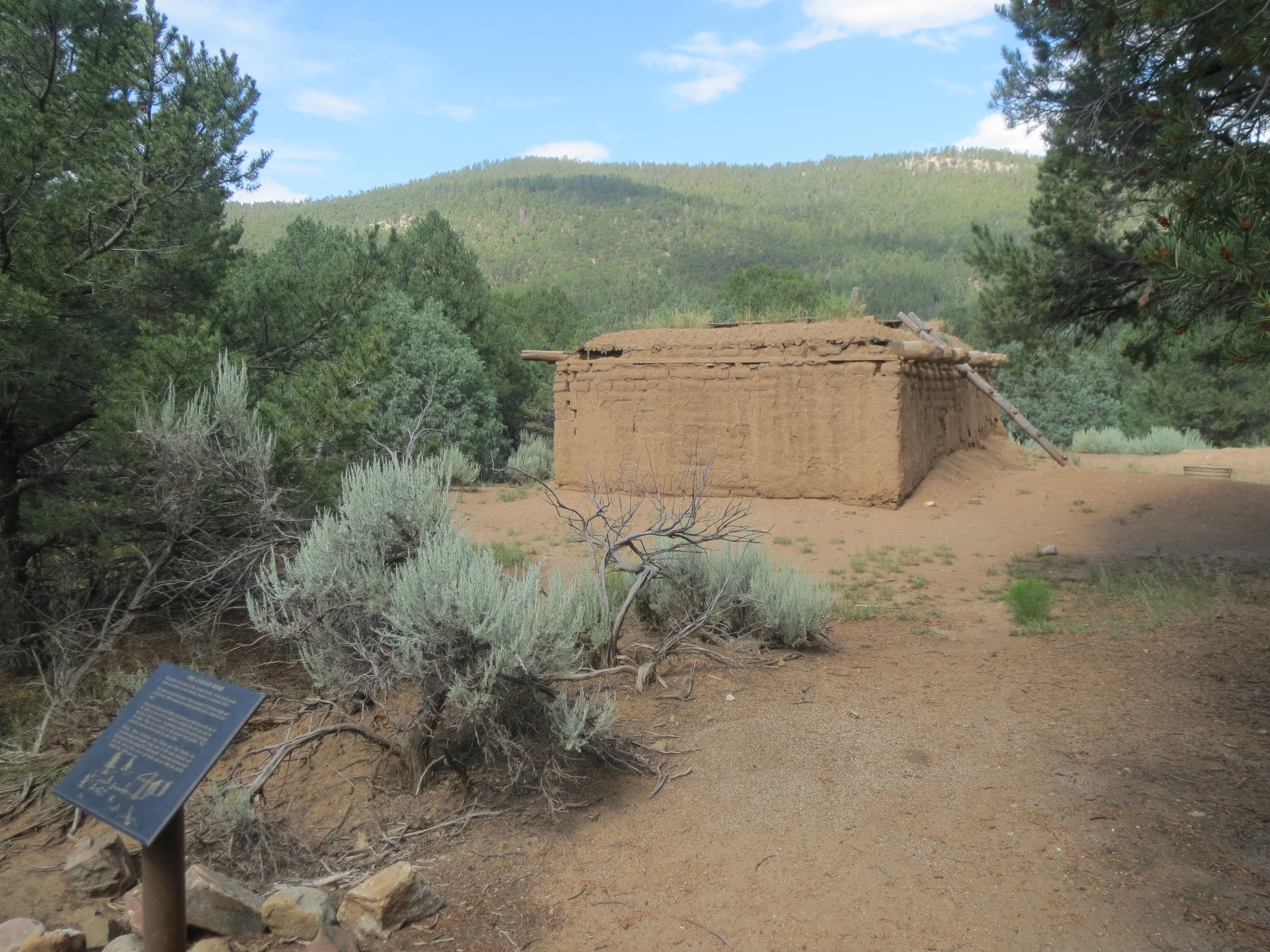
Pot Creek Cultural Site, in Carson Nation Forest, south of Taos

== See also ==
- List of national forests of the United States
