= Echo Amphitheater =

Coordinates: 36.3593°N 106.5284°W

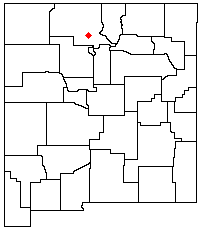
Location of the Echo Amphitheater within New Mexico

Echo Amphitheater is a natural amphitheater located in the Carson National Forest in northern New Mexico, United States. It is about 4 miles (6.4 km) north-northwest of the Ghost Ranch.

== Legend ==
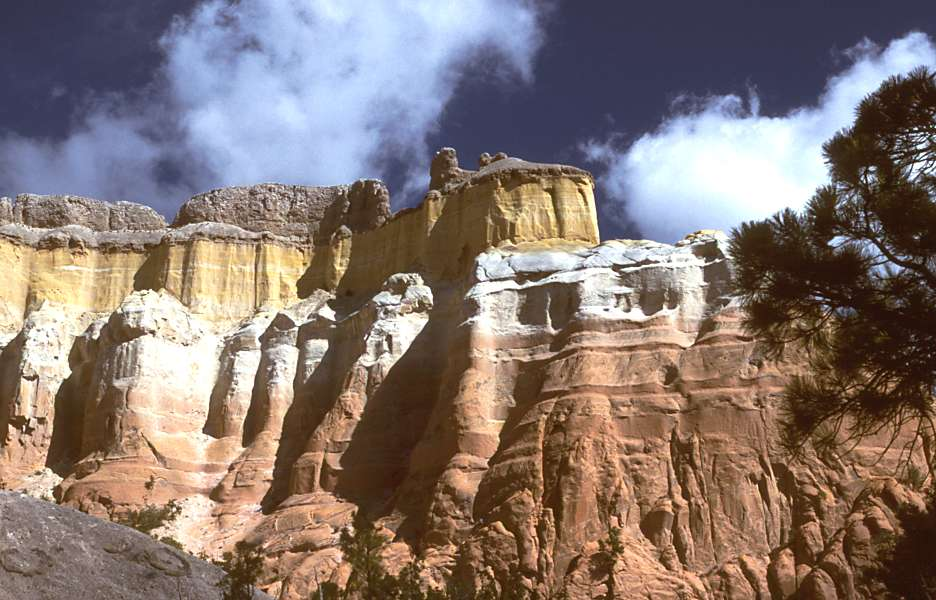
Sandstone cliffs near the Echo Amphitheater

In the spring of 1861, a group of settlers from Iowa were farming in northern New Mexico when they were set upon by a band of Navajo who had ventured into the region. The settlers (one family was the Zendalters and another family was the Treblers) were taken to the top of the amphitheater and executed. According to a local folktale, their blood spilled into the amphitheater, staining its walls. Three years later, when the Navajo were being forced on the "Long Walk" to Bosque Redondo by the U.S. Army, ten Navajo men were killed at the top of the amphitheater in retribution for the earlier deaths. Once again, blood spilled down the walls of the amphitheater. The blood seeped into the pores of the rock and dried and supposedly is still visible today. It is said that in the echoes returned from the cliff's walls one can hear the anguished cries of the dead.

== Protest ==
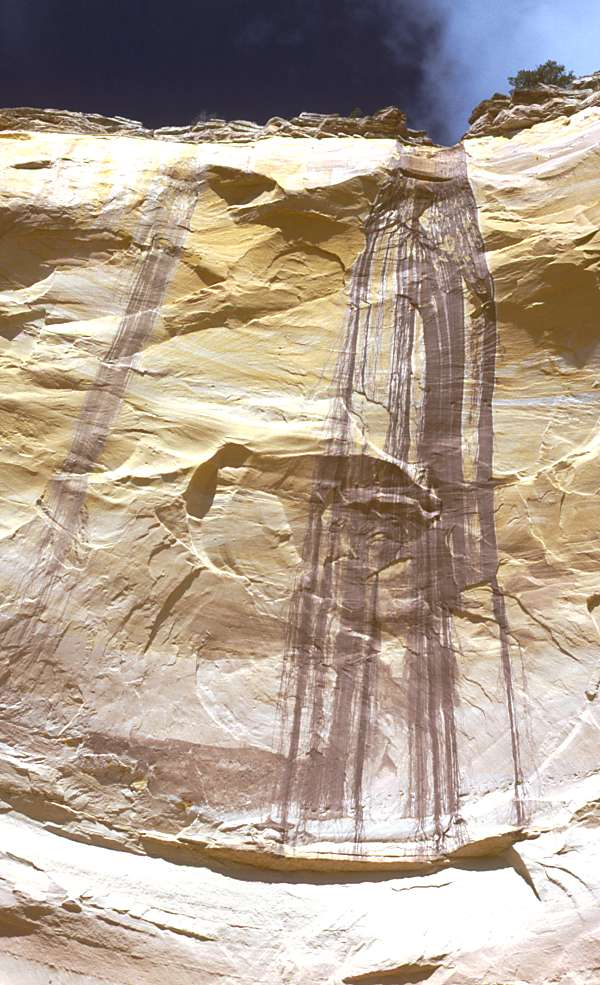
Rock face and desert varnish in the Echo Amphitheater

In October 1966, the Alianza Federal de Mercedes, an organization dedicated to the restoration of certain land grants entrenched in the 1848 Treaty of Guadalupe Hidalgo to descendants of then-Mexican citizens, occupied Echo Amphitheater in an attempt to create a land grant community. The occupants were evicted, after five days, for overstaying camping permits.
