= Pot Creek Cultural Site =

Pueblo in Taos County, New Mexico

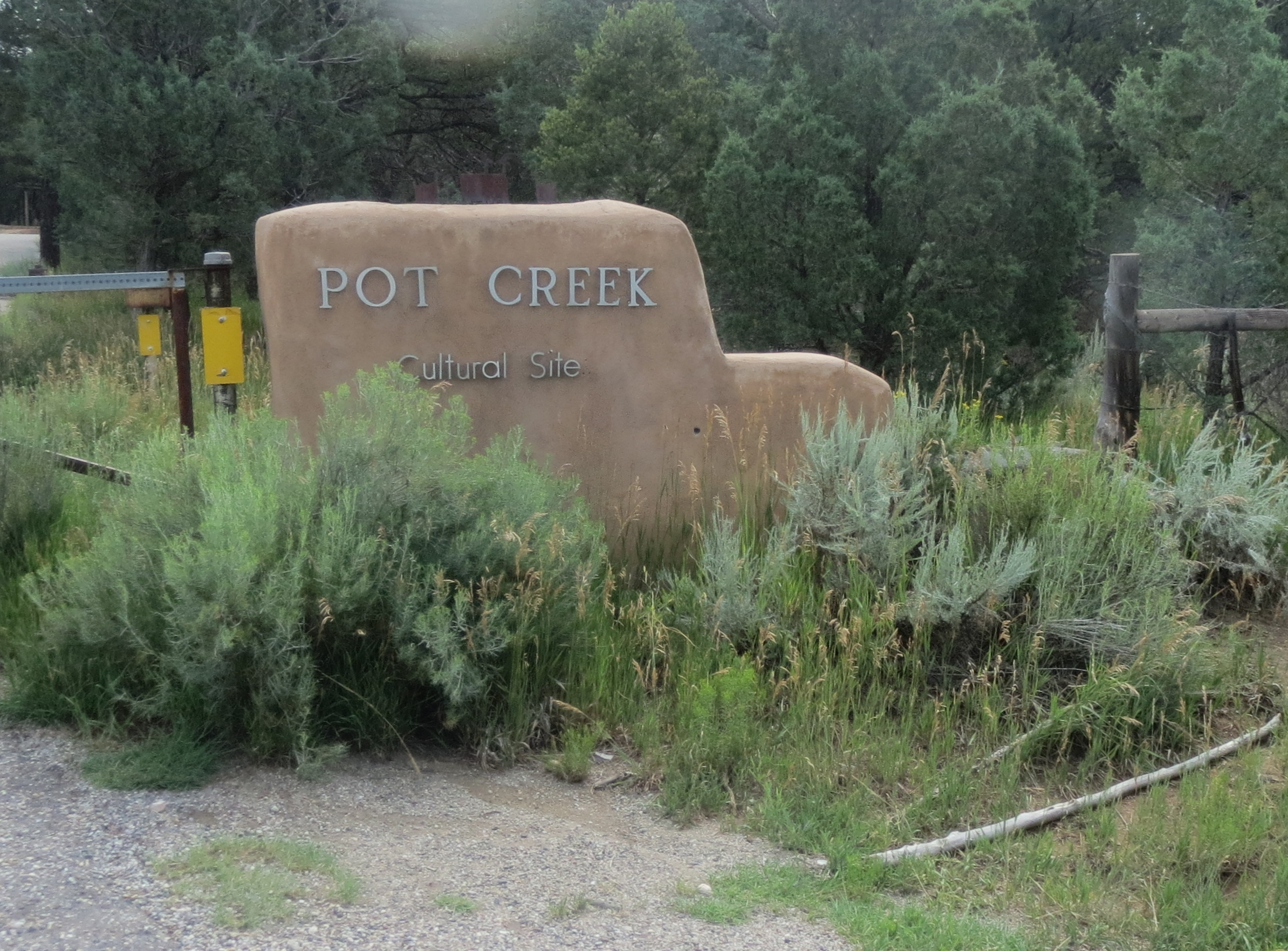
Pot Creek Entrance

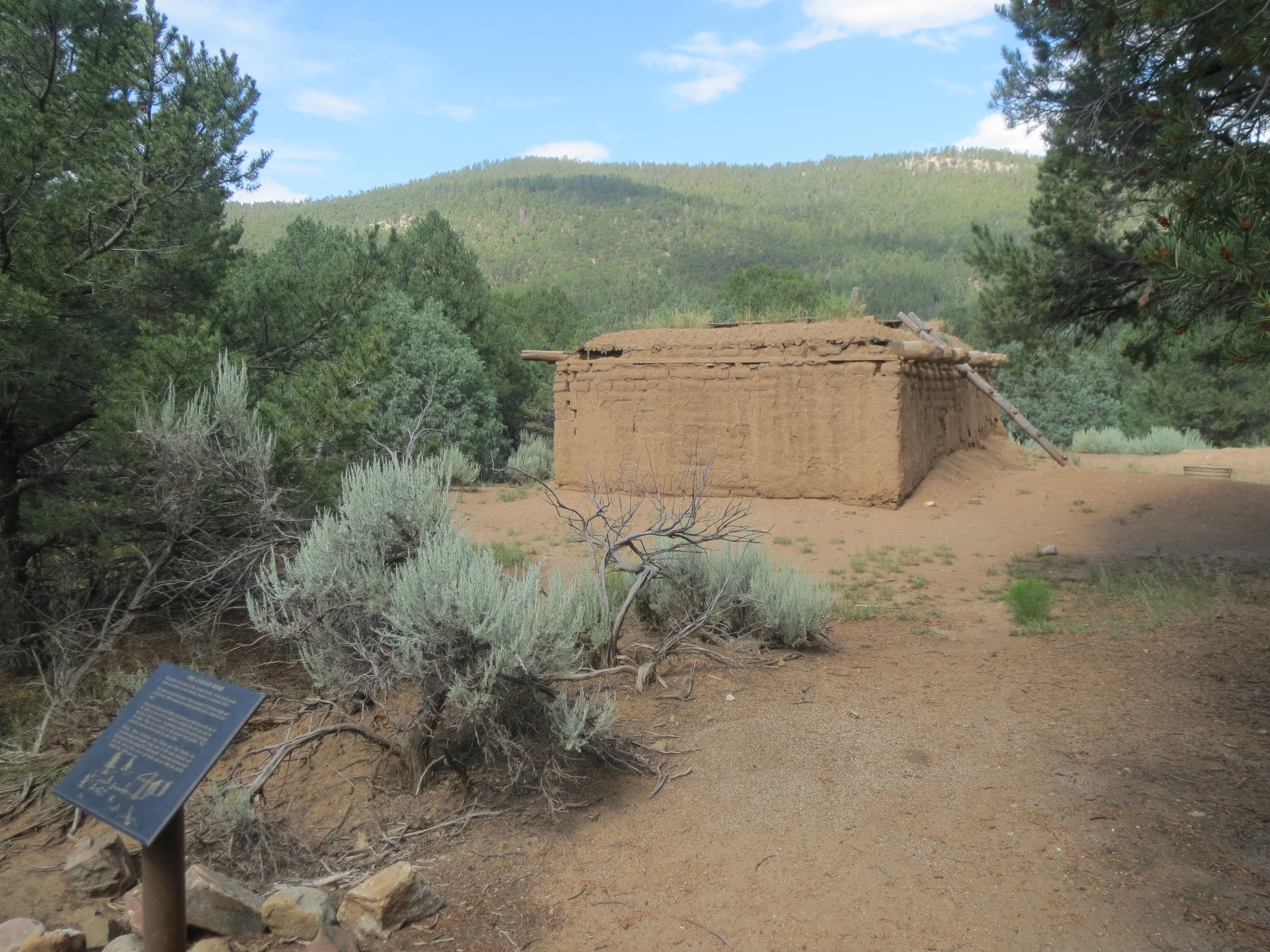
Pot Creek Pueblo

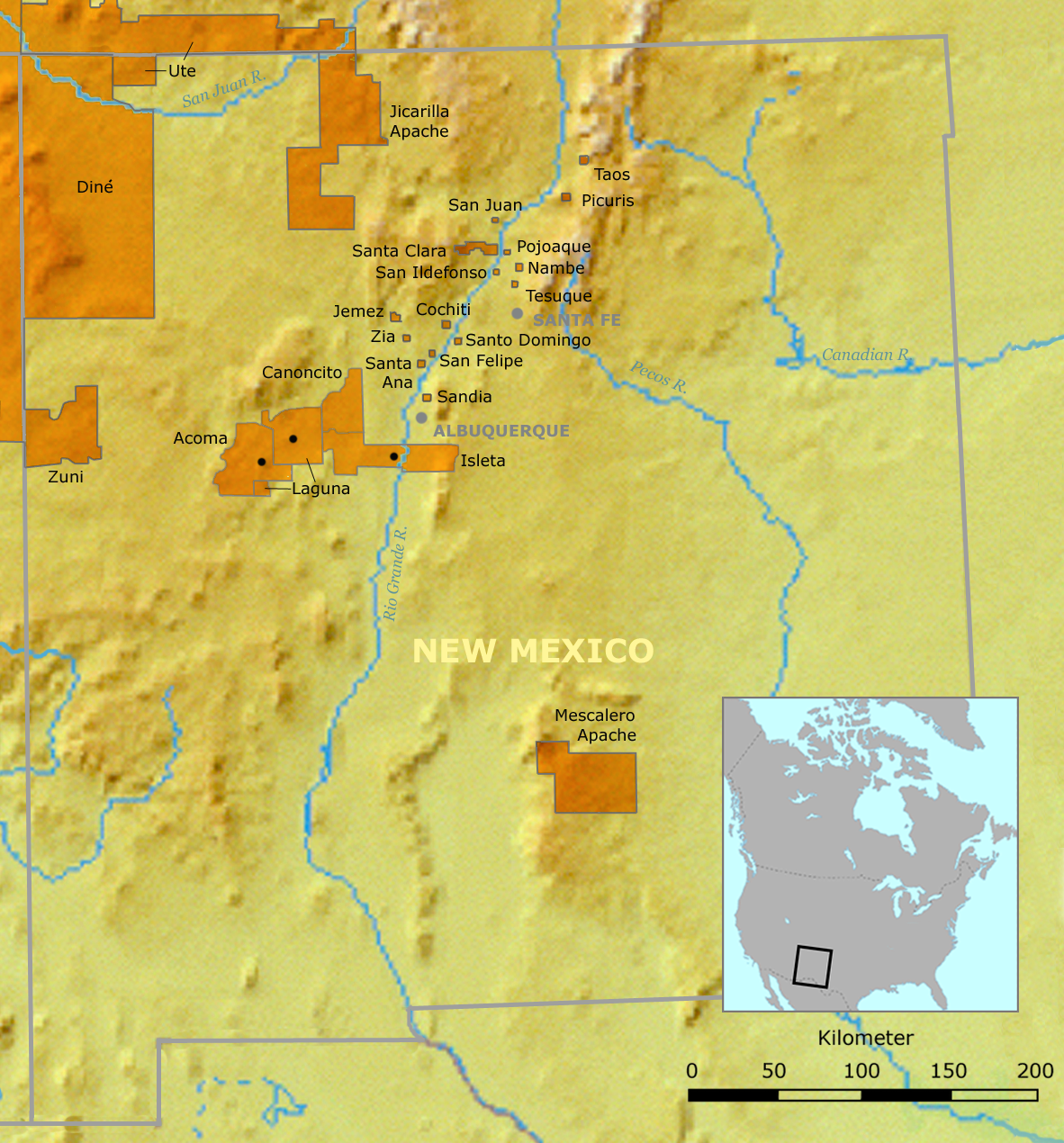
Some of the pueblos in New Mexico

Pot Creek Cultural Site (Northern Tiwa: T’oythǝna) is an abandoned 13th century pueblo located on private land owned by Southern Methodist University and on public Carson National Forest land in Taos County, New Mexico.

== Geography ==
Located within the Rio Grande valley and surrounded by the Sangre de Cristo Mountains, the site is at 2,195 metres (7,201 ft) in elevation. Its sources of water were the Rio Grande del Rancho, also known as the Little Rio Grande, and Rio del la Olla, also known as Pot Creek.

== Archaeological site ==
The site was a large adobe pueblo consisting of a large plaza, great kiva, and small plazas with multiple-storied blocks of rooms and smaller kivas. Its height of occupation was between 1260 (Note: Based upon archaeological evidence and Puebloan folklore, it is believed that some of the people from the abandoned Chaco Canyon migrated to the Taos Valley about 1250.) and 1320 CE. The pueblo is believed to have been similar to Taos Pueblo and had about 400 rooms on the ground floor for storage, with additional rooms in the multiple-storied dwellings used as dwellings. It is estimated that the pueblo was occupied for about three generations, with its peak population about 1310. Around 1318 a great kiva was under construction, but it was never completed. It is believed that the pueblo was abandoned about 1320, at which time the southern portion of the site was destroyed by fire. Residents moved to nearby Picuris and Taos Pueblos.

The pueblo people lived primarily on a diet of corn, squash and beans that they grew. They also ate bison, local animals and wild plants. The made their own pottery. Gray pottery was used for cooking. They also decorated black-on-white pottery vessels and made tools from stone and animal bones.

The site has been studied by Southern Methodist University for more than 50 years.

== Carson National Forest site ==
The portion of the pueblo located on Carson National Forest is open to visitors from June to September. It is about 50 yards from a parking area on Highway 518 at milepost 66.4 and has a picnic area and restrooms. The one-mile loop trail has signs that interpret the lifestyle of the pueblo residents and leads to a reproduction of a pueblo room and a kiva.

Coordinates: 36°16′45″N 105°34′34.61″W

== Gallery ==
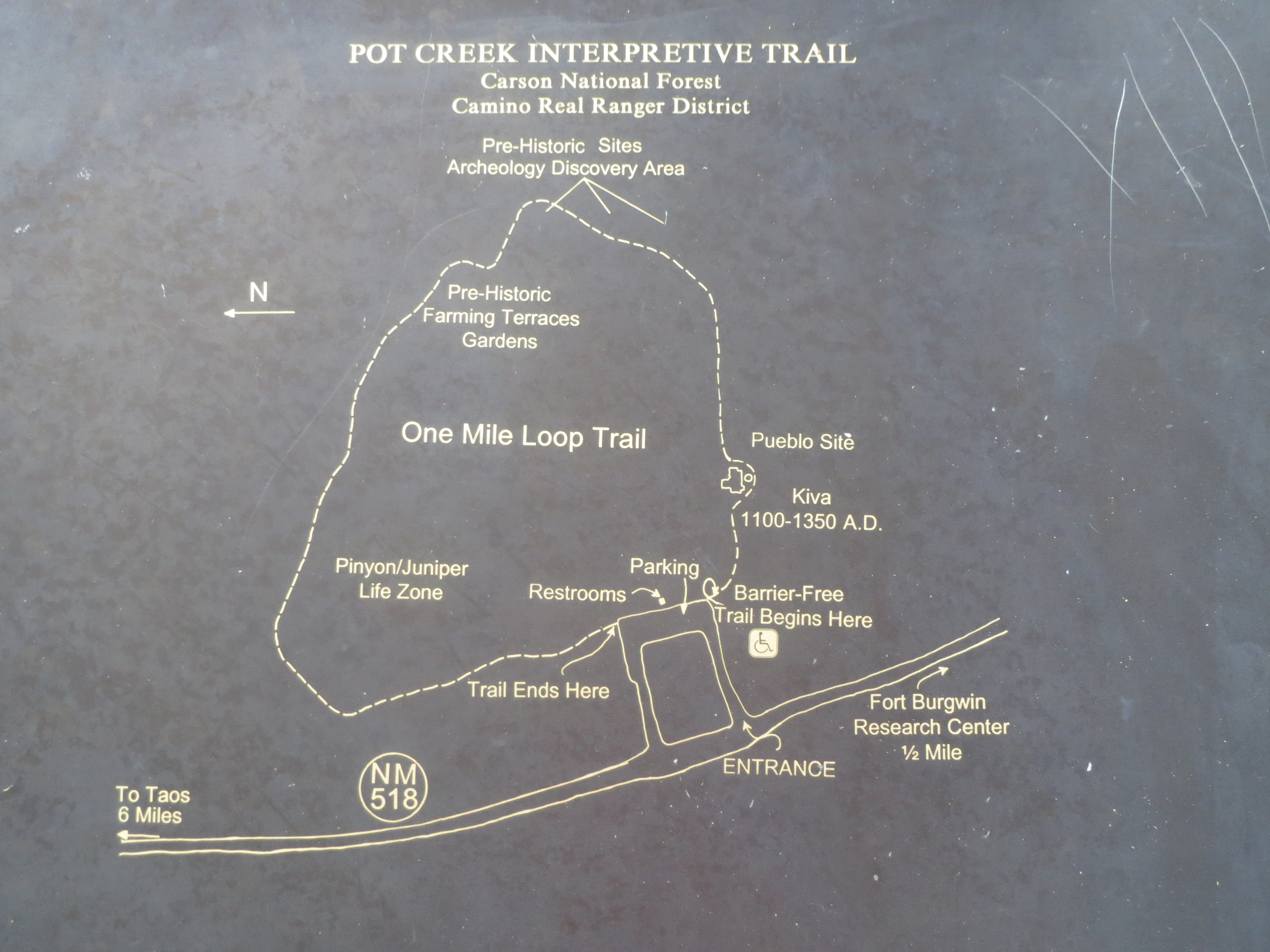
Pot Creek Trail Map

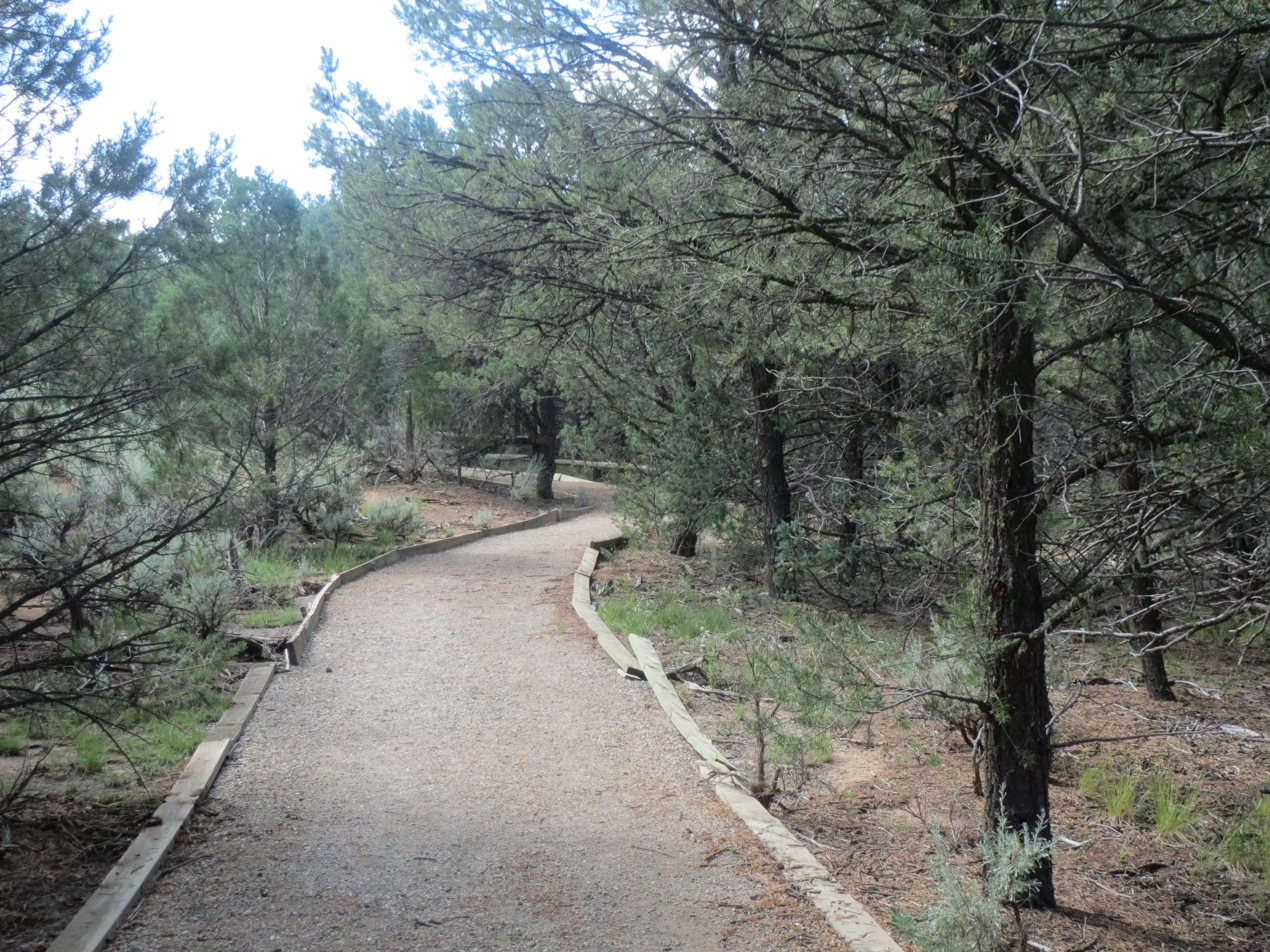
Pot Creek Trail

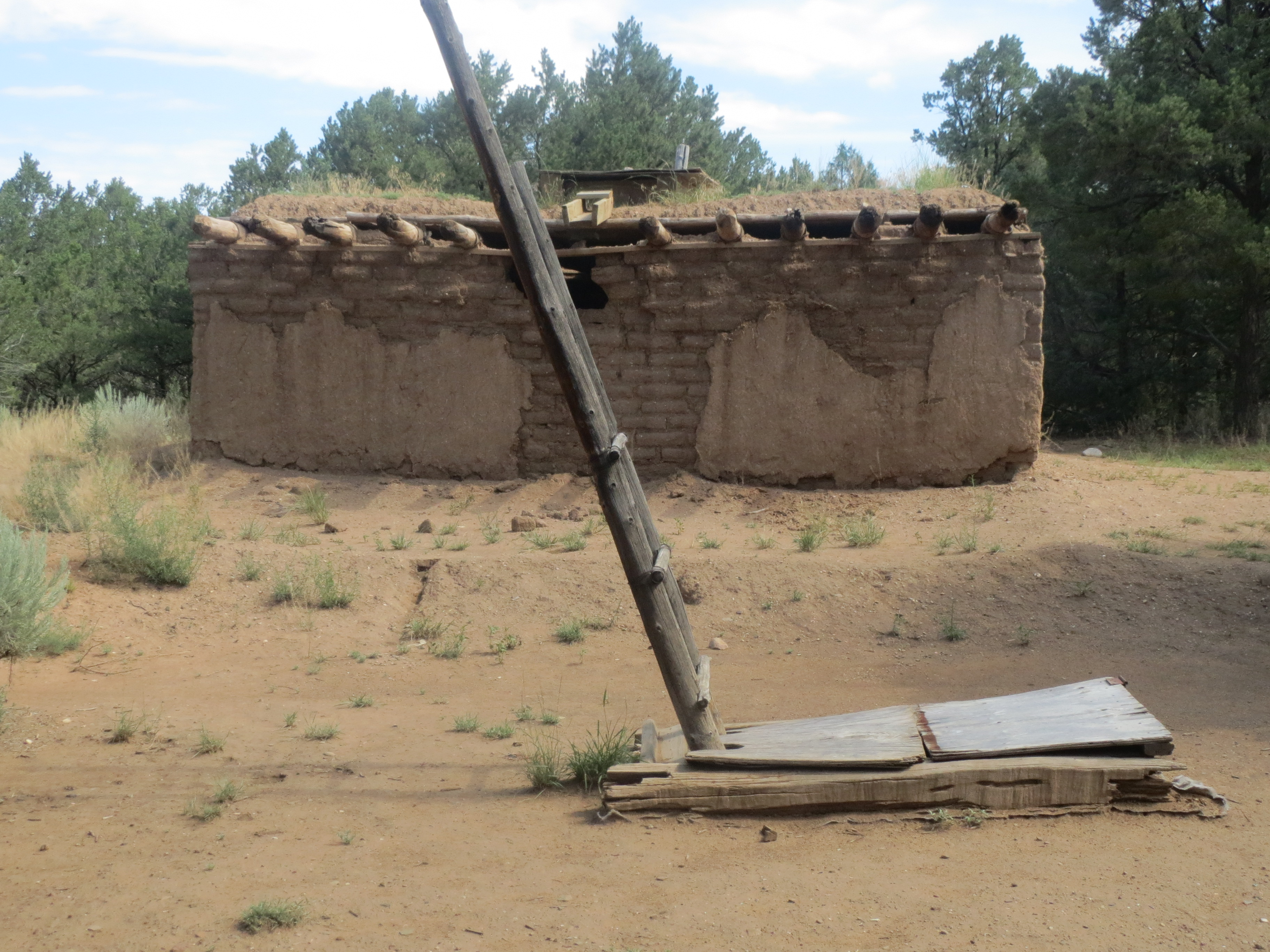
Pot Creek Pueblo Room and Kiva

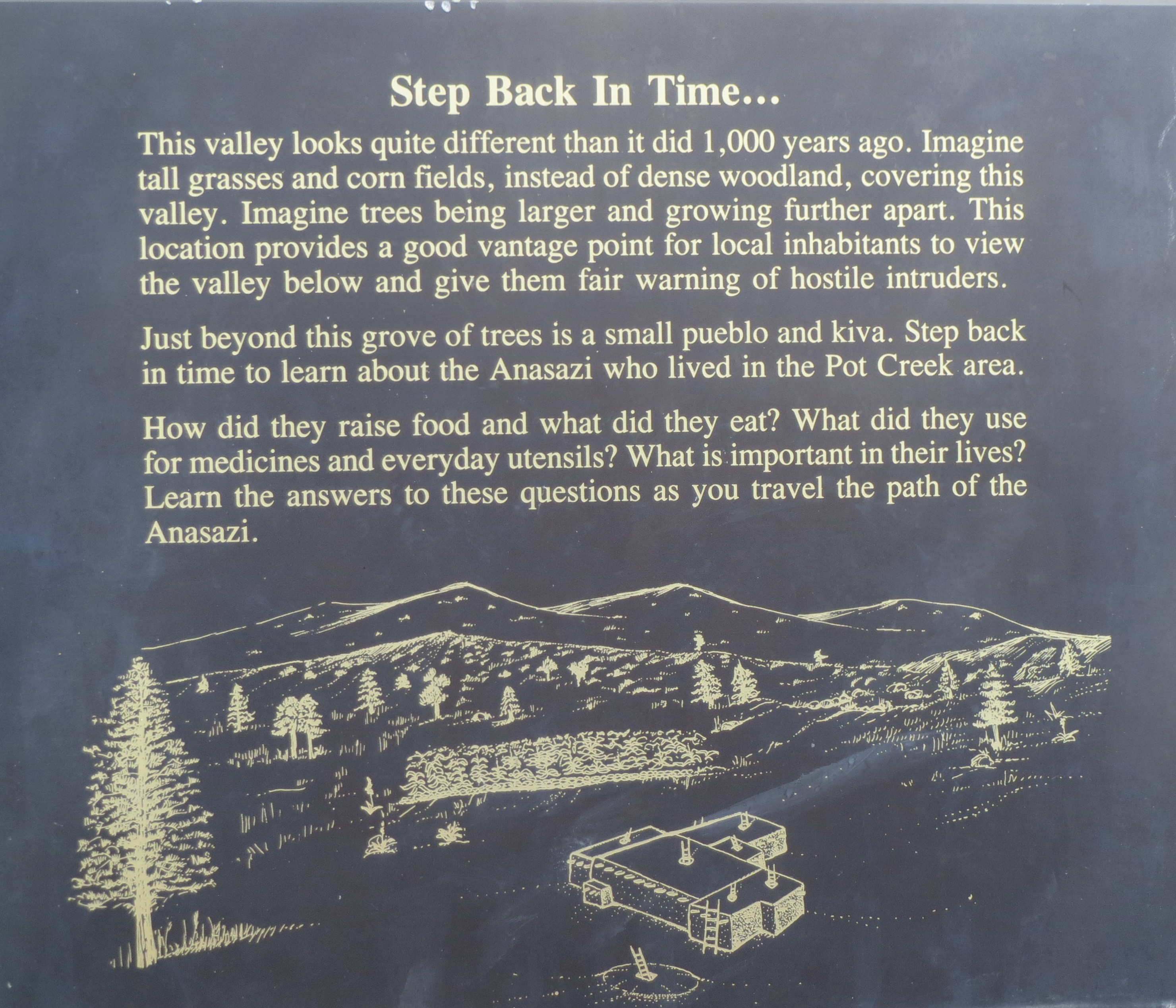
Pot Creek Sign

== See also ==
- Eight Northern Pueblos
- High Road to Taos, New Mexico
- Puebloan peoples
- Southern Methodist University - Taos SMU archaeology field school program
