= Pecos National Forest =

National forest in New Mexico, United States

Pecos National Forest in New Mexico was established as the Pecos River Forest Reserve by the United States General Land Office on January 11, 1892 with 311,040 acres (1,258.7 km^{2}). After the transfer of federal forests to the U.S. Forest Service in 1905, it became Pecos River National Forest on March 4, 1907, and was renamed Pecos National Forest on July 1, 1908. On July 1, 1915 the entire forest was combined with Jemez National Forest to establish Santa Fe National Forest.

The Pecos forest is administered as the Pecos/Las Vegas Ranger District and a portion of the Espanola Ranger Districts of Santa Fe National Forest, comprising all SFNF lands to the east of Santa Fe.
