= El Rito Crags =

Sport climbing venue, New Mexico

Coordinates: 36°23′39″N 106°11′46″W

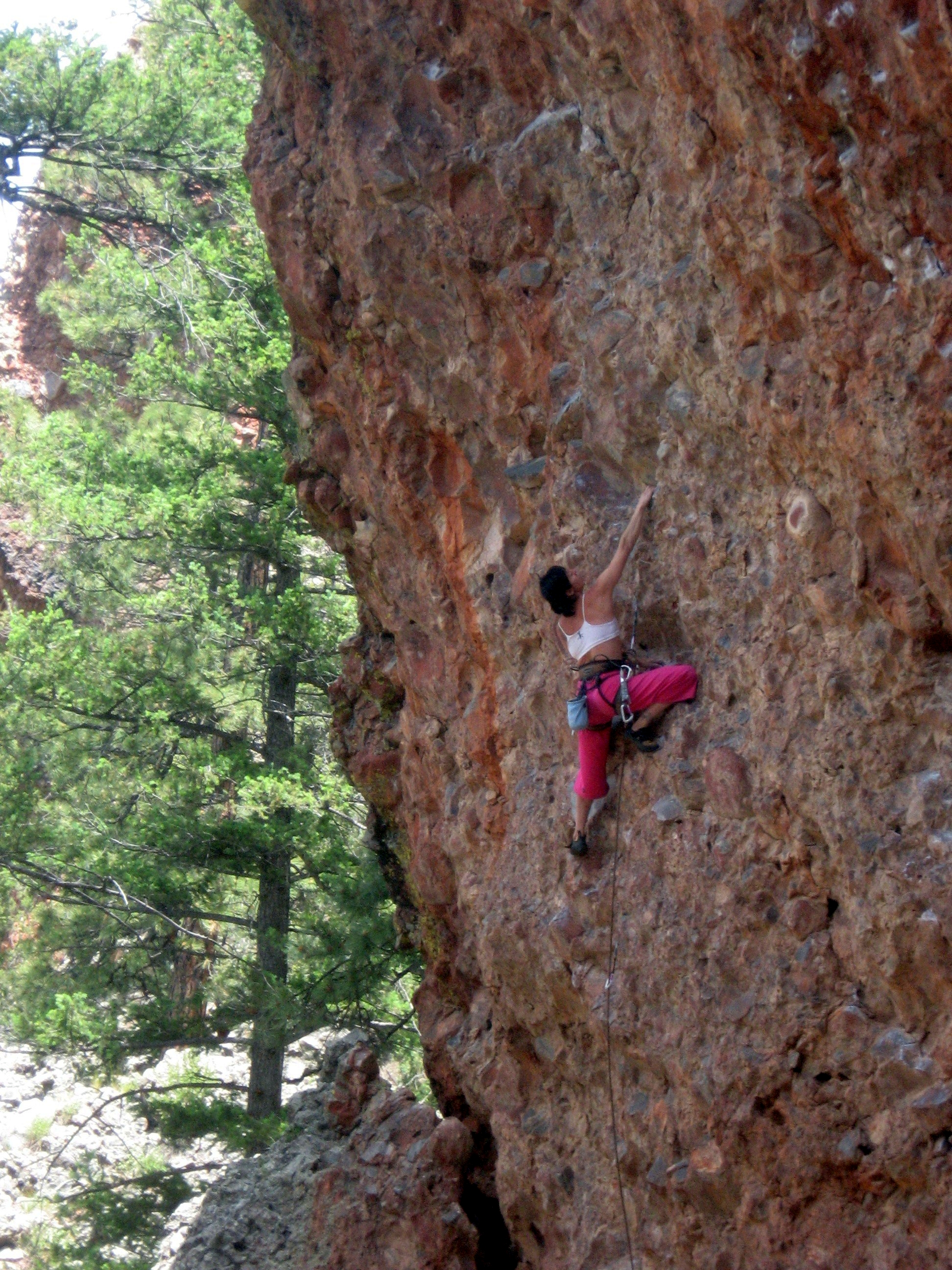
Climbing route at El Rito Crags

El Rito Crags is a rock climbing destination in Carson National Forest considered to be one of New Mexico's best sport climbing venues. In addition to the sport climbing area, El Rito has a large cliff with many easy to moderate trad climbing routes.
