= Dome Wilderness =

Protected area in New Mexico, US

- IUCN category Ib (wilderness area)
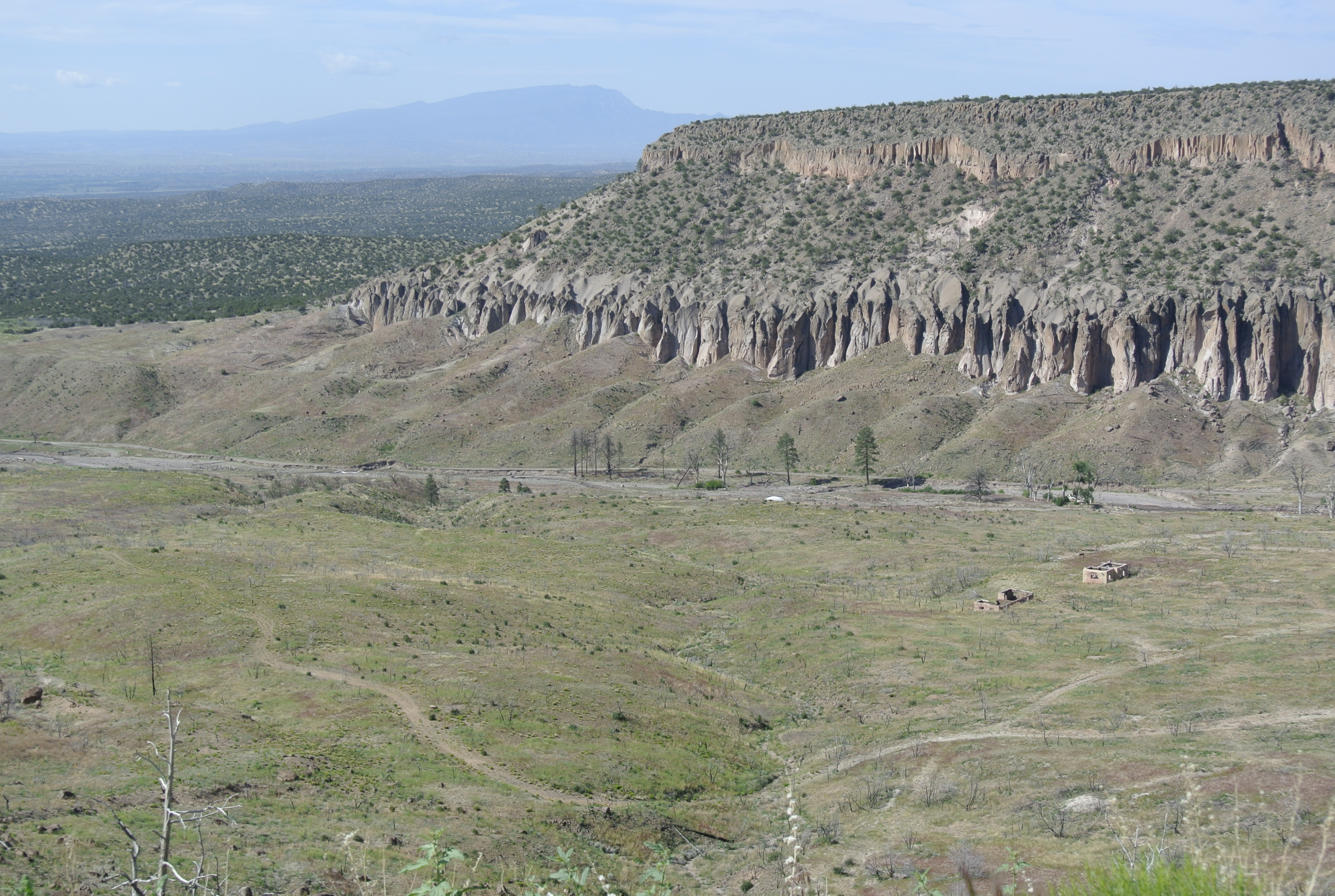

- Location within New Mexico Location within the United States
- Location: Sandoval County, New Mexico
- Nearest city: Los Alamos, New Mexico
- Coordinates: 35.7374241057°N 106.3732511°W
- Area: 5,200 acres (2,100 ha)
- Established: December 19, 1980
- Governing body: United States Forest Service

Dome Wilderness in New Mexico was created by Congress in 1980. The wilderness area is around 5,200 acres (2,100 ha) on the Jemez Ranger District of the Santa Fe National Forest. The wilderness area borders the Bandelier Wilderness in Bandelier National Monument.

The Dome Wilderness is easily accessible from Los Alamos, New Mexico, by paved and gravel roads. There are several trailheads on the national forest and some trails extend into the national monument, allowing for long loop hikes. Like the rest of the Santa Fe National Forest, the wilderness area has many prehistoric sites.

Because a fire destroyed much of the Dome Wilderness in 1996, the stark landscape stands out in contrast to other parts of the forest. The highest point in the wilderness area is near St. Peter's Dome.
