= Santa Fe National Forest =

National forest in the U.S. state of New Mexico

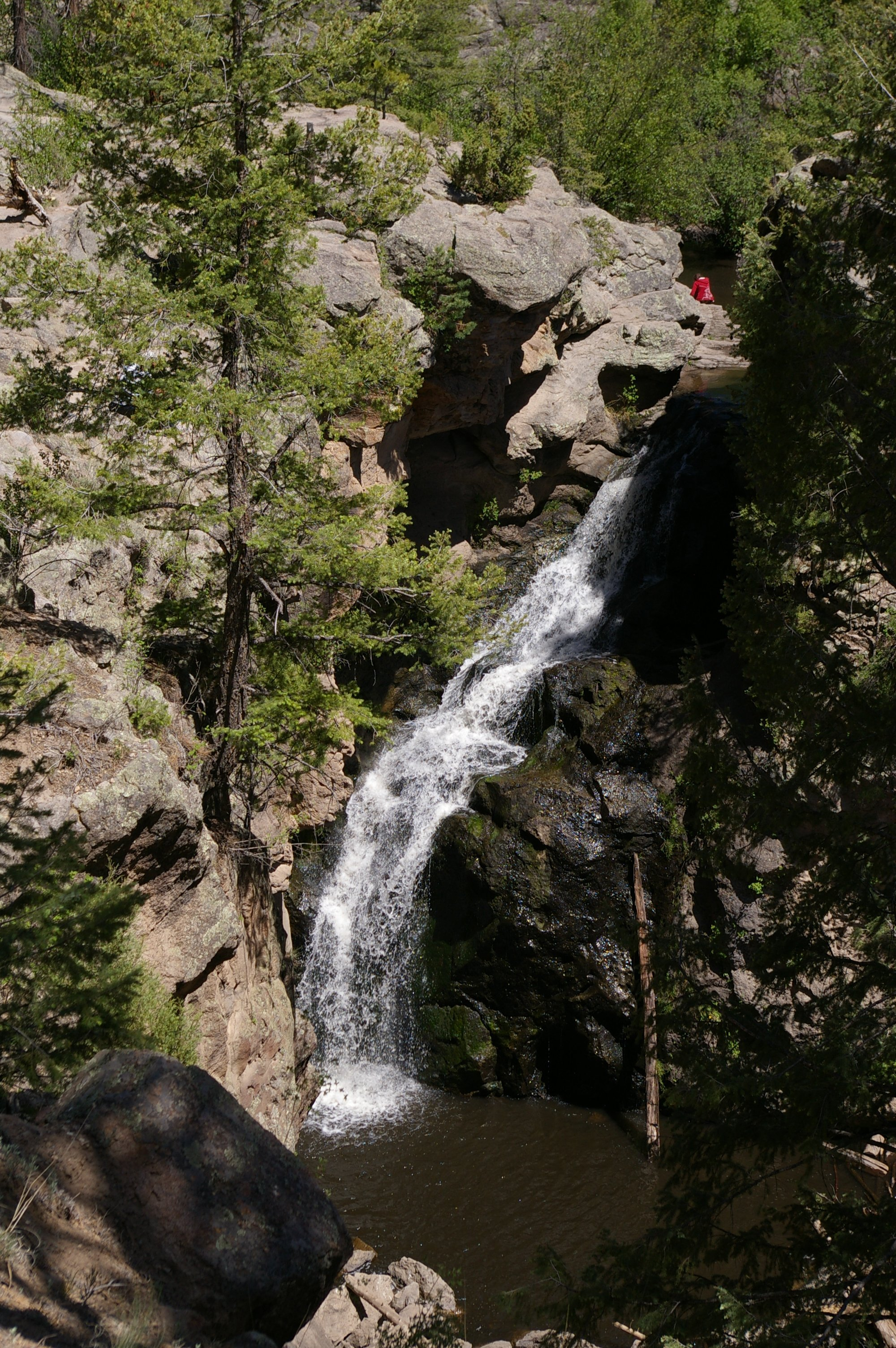
- Photo of the Jemez Falls

- Location within the United States Location within New Mexico
- Location: New Mexico, United States
- Nearest city: Santa Fe, NM
- Coordinates: 35°42′N 106°12′W
- Area: 1,558,452 acres (6,306.83 km^{2})
- Established: July 1, 1915
- Governing body: U.S. Forest Service
- Website: Santa Fe National Forest

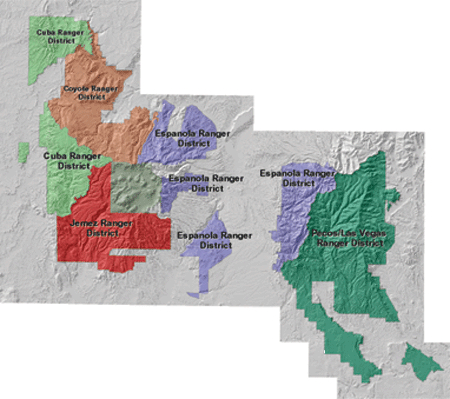
A map of the Santa Fe National Forest showing the widely separated Ranger Districts.

The Santa Fe National Forest is a protected national forest in northern New Mexico in the Southwestern United States. It was established in 1915 and covers 1,558,452 acres (6,306.83 km^{2}). Elevations range from 5,300 feet (1600 m) to 13,103 feet (4000 m) at the summit of Truchas Peak, located within the Pecos Wilderness. The Jemez, Coyote, and Cuba districts are located in the Jemez Mountains; the Pecos/Las Vegas district is located in the Sangre de Cristo Mountains; and the Española district is located in both mountain ranges. In descending order of land area the forest lies in parts of Rio Arriba, San Miguel, Sandoval, Santa Fe, Mora, and Los Alamos counties. Forest headquarters are located in the city of Santa Fe.

Santa Fe National Forest was established on July 1, 1915 by the U.S. Forest Service with the amalgamation of Jemez National Forest to the west of Santa Fe and Pecos National Forest to the east. The former division is remembered in the ranger districts, with the Jemez Ranger District to the west and the Pecos/Las Vegas district to the east. The western district is adjacent to the Valles Caldera National Preserve, which is administered by the National Park Service.

Bandelier National Monument was created from a portion of Santa Fe in 1916, but additional land was added to Bandelier from land that was formerly part of Los Alamos National Laboratory and from land that was owned by the Dunnigans when they owned the Baca Ranch.

== Districts ==
=== Coyote Ranger District ===
The Coyote Ranger District is the northernmost district of the Santa Fe National Forest and covers 265,100 acres (1073 km^{2}). It includes the Rio Chama and most of the Chama River Canyon Wilderness (with a small part extending into neighboring Carson National Forest), as well as the northern portion of the San Pedro Parks Wilderness. The district office is in the town of Coyote.

=== Cuba Ranger District ===
The Cuba Ranger District is in the westernmost district of the Santa Fe National Forest and is home to the San Pedro Parks Wilderness. The district includes the southern portion of the San Pedro Parks Wilderness. Its district office is in Cuba.

=== Española Ranger District ===
The Española Ranger District extends from the foothills of Santa Fe, New Mexico to the Pecos Wilderness and borders the towns of Española, New Mexico and Los Alamos, New Mexico. A large stand of aspens is visible over long distances during flavescence, thus there is a spike in nature tourism. Aspen Vista campground offers access to this grove.

Santa Fe National Forest near Los Alamos is the location of an orienteering map.

=== Jemez Ranger District ===
The Jemez Ranger District was established in 1905 as the Jemez Forest Reserve. A number of hot springs and the Jemez Soda Dam on the Jemez River are among the attractions, along with the Dome Wilderness, which lies just west of Bandelier National Monument. The district office is in Jemez Springs.

=== Pecos/Las Vegas Ranger District ===
The Pecos/Las Vegas Ranger District was established in 1892 as the Pecos River Forest Reserve. The easternmost element of Santa Fe National Forest includes the Pecos River lying within the Pecos Wilderness, which also extends into neighboring Carson National Forest. Its offices are in Pecos and Las Vegas.

== See also ==
- List of national forests of the United States
