= Jemez National Forest =

Former national forest in New Mexico

Coordinates: 35°46′39.7″N 106°41′16.6″W

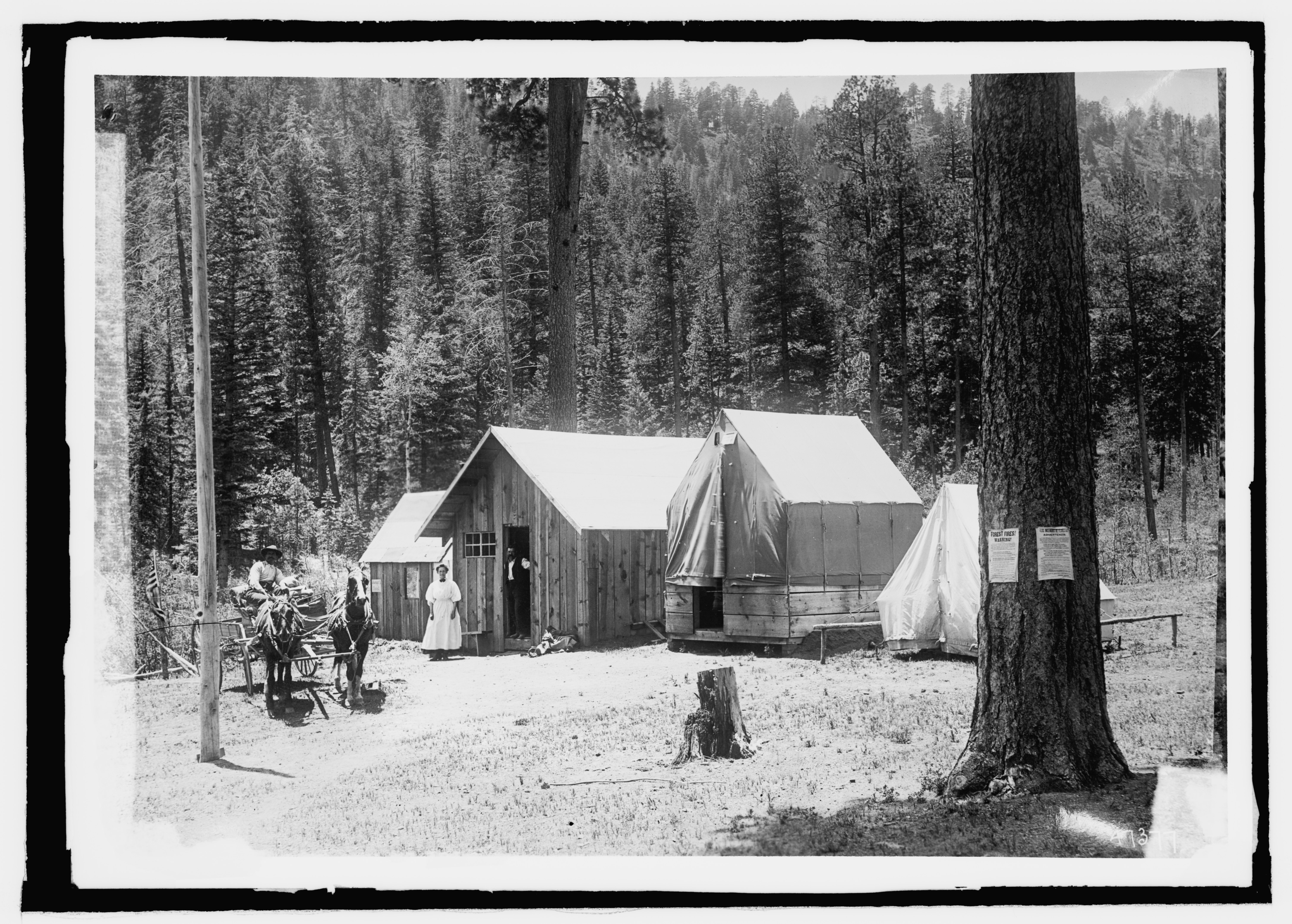
Cabin in Jemez National Forest (c. 1908-1919)

Jemez National Forest in New Mexico was established as the Jemez Forest Reserve by the U.S. Forest Service on October 12, 1905 with 1,237,205 acres (5,006.79 km^{2}). It became a National Forest on March 4, 1907. On July 1, 1915 most of the forest was combined with Pecos National Forest to establish Santa Fe National Forest, and the name was discontinued. A portion was previously transferred to Carson National Forest in 1908.

The Jemez forest is administered as the Jemez, Coyote and Cuba Ranger Districts and the western portion of the Espanola Ranger District of Santa Fe National Forest, comprising all SFNF lands to the west of Santa Fe. The forest almost entirely surrounds the Valles Caldera National Preserve, which is managed by the National Park Service as a "national preserve." The Valles Caldera National Preserve was managed by an independent "Trust" between 2000 and 2015. Congress extinguished the Trust in December 2014. This region is rich with archaeological sites associated with the ancestral Puebloan people.
