= Chama River Canyon Wilderness =

Wilderness in New Mexico, United States

- IUCN category Ib (wilderness area)
- Location within New Mexico Location within the United States
- Location: Rio Arriba County, New Mexico
- Nearest city: Española, New Mexico
- Coordinates: 36.3349382303°N 106.6611946°W
- Area: 50,300 acres (20,356 ha)
- Established: February 24, 1978
- Governing body: United States Forest Service

Congress created the Chama River Canyon Wilderness in New Mexico in February 1978. The wilderness area covers approximately 50,300 acres (20,356 ha) on the Coyote Ranger District of the Santa Fe National Forest and the Carson National Forest.

The water in the Rio Chama brings the canyon area to life. Lush vegetation that supports abundant wildlife contrasts with the seemingly bare rocky slopes that lead to the mesa tops.

The wilderness area surrounds much private property along the waterways.

The Chama River Canyon Wilderness is 50,000 acres in northern New Mexico. Here, Scull Bridge Road borders the wilderness area on the left of the photo.

The wilderness area includes the site of the Cañon de Chama land grant. A large area of northern New Mexico was included in the original Mexican land grant, but the U.S. Government confirmed only a small area along the river. The village cemetery is in the wilderness area.

The Rio Chama is a Wild and Scenic River and is not part of the wilderness area. A Forest Service road parallels the river and in some places the wilderness area is only 100 yards from the road. The easy road access means that rafting is a popular activity when water levels are adequate. The Continental Divide Trail traverses the wilderness area and crosses the river on Scull Bridge. Hiking and horseback riding are other popular activities in the wilderness area.

The wilderness area is easily accessible from Santa Fe, New Mexico, along U.S. Highway 84.

== Images ==
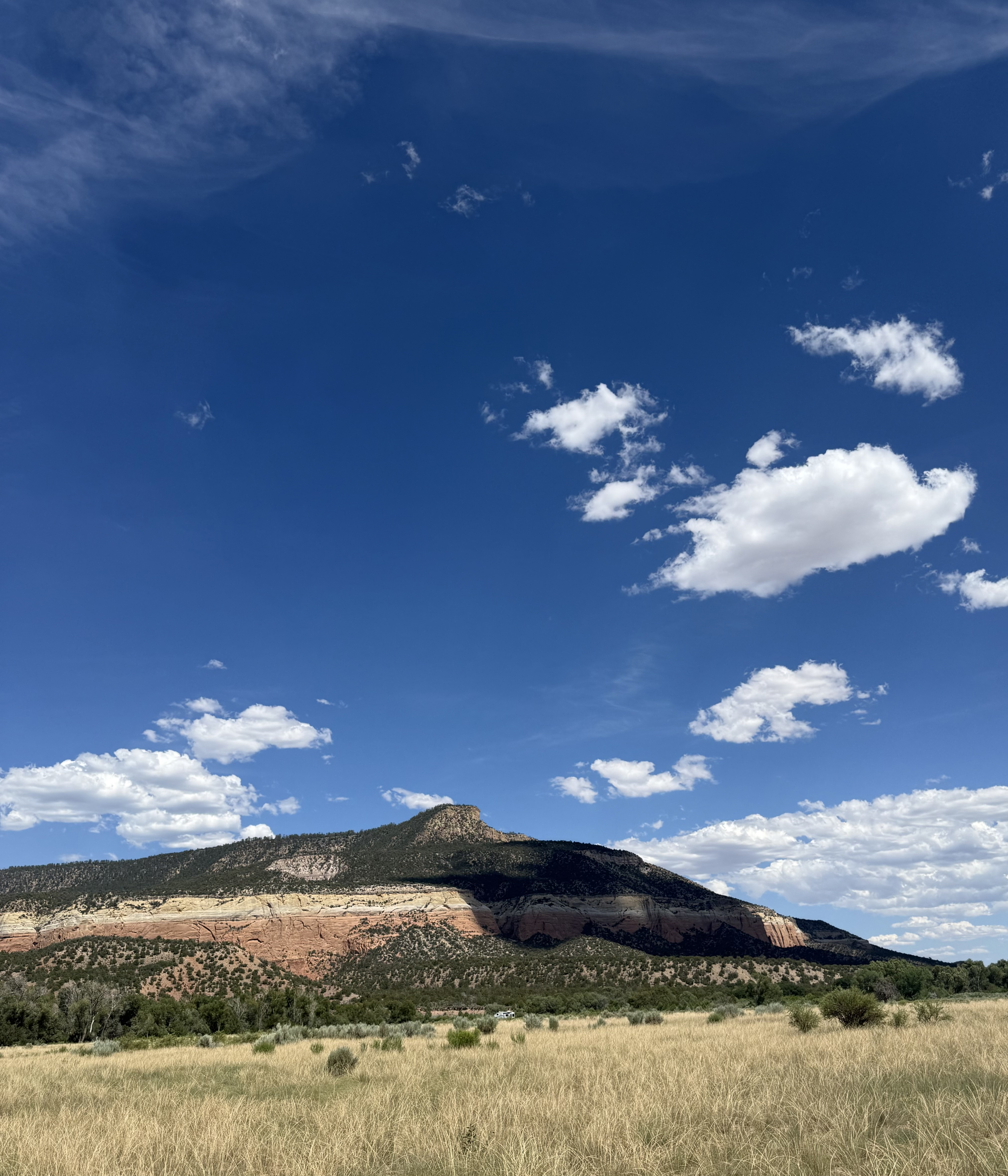
Mesa de los Viejos seen from the right bank of the Chama.
