= Spence Hot Springs =

Thermal springs

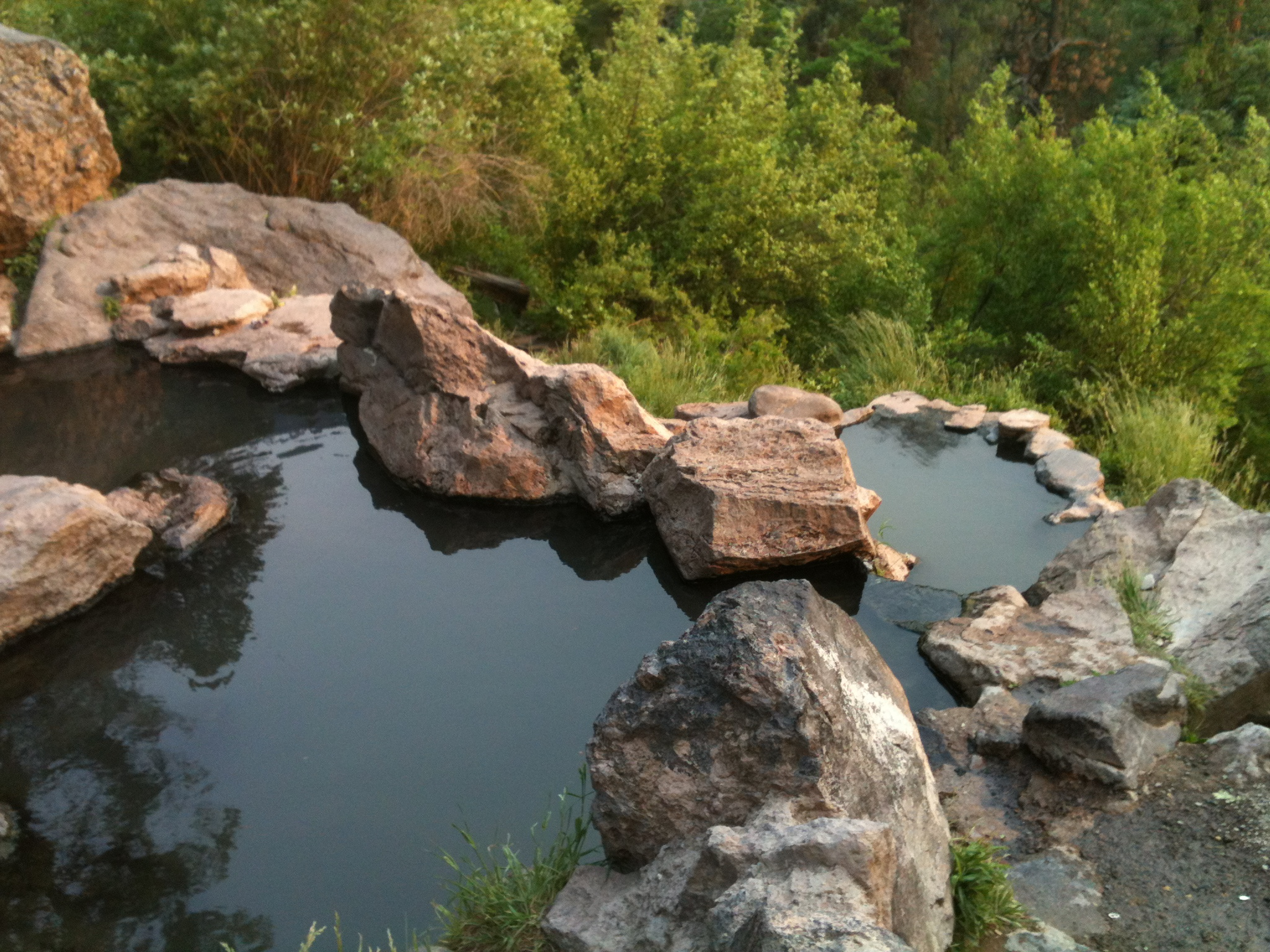
- Spence Hot Spring, upper and lower pool
- Interactive map of Spence Hot Springs
- Location: Jemez Springs, New Mexico
- Coordinates: 35°50′58″N 106°37′47″W
- Elevation: 6,000 ft (1,800 m)
- Type: geothermal
- Temperature: lower source: 100°F, upper source: 109°F

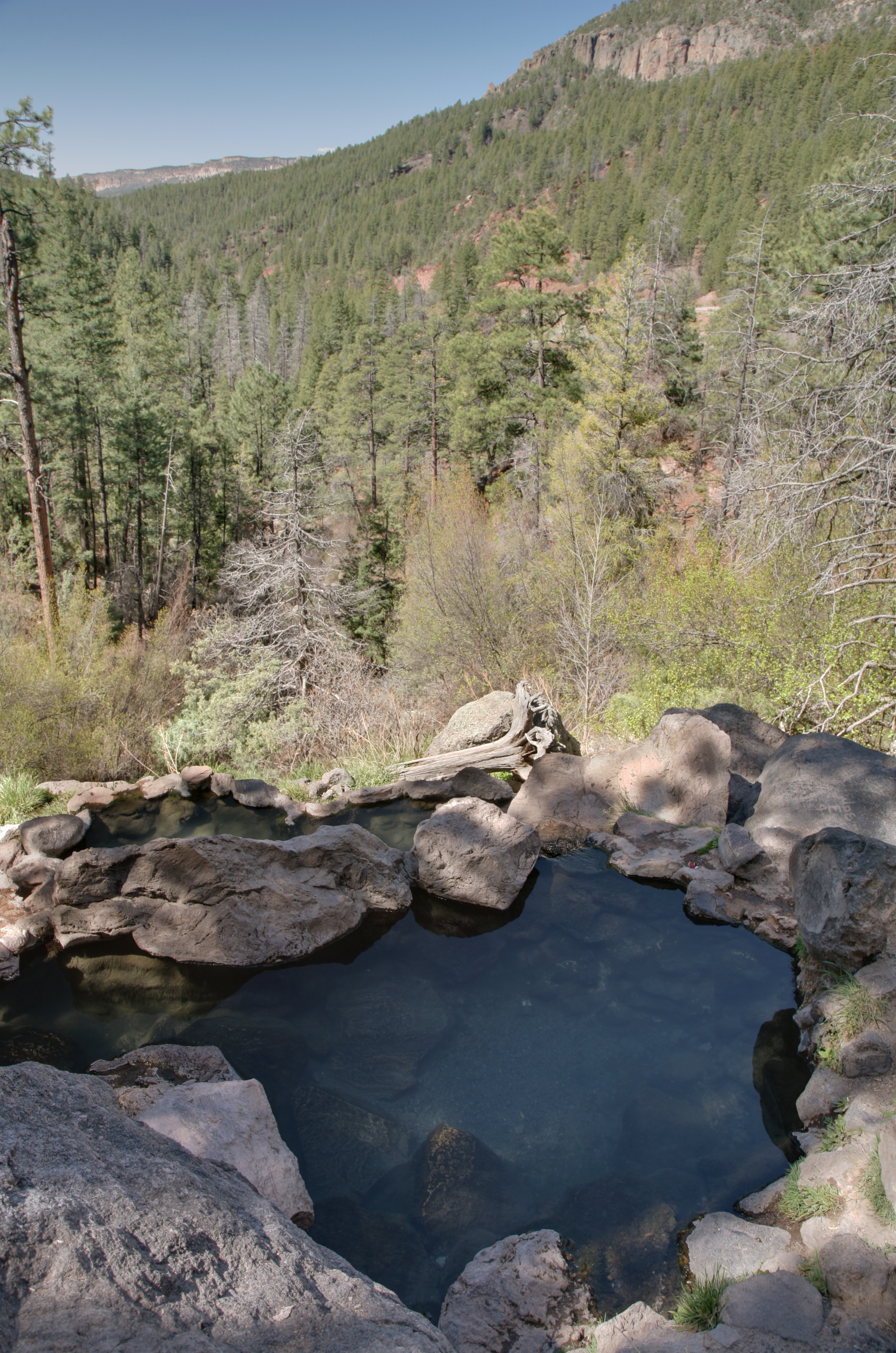
Spence hot spring lower pool

Spence Hot Springs are a group of geothermal springs located north of the town of Jemez Springs, New Mexico.

== Features ==
The main spring is located on a hillside above the Jemez River, and flows into a sandy bottomed primitive rock soaking pool before cascading into two additional rock pools of different temperatures terraced on the hillside. The middle pool also has an additional water source from a spring inside a cave with a water temperature 100°F/38°C. The lower pool is the coolest of the three at 95°F. There are two more springs with soaking pools 50 feet uphill and an additional spring located 200 more feet uphill.

Due to overuse, the condition of the area has been subjected to considerable resource damage.

== Geology ==
Spence Hot Springs are located at the edge of a collapsed super volcano, the Valles Caldera, near the Soda Dam.

== Water profile ==
The water emerges from the upper spring at 109°F; and at 100°F from the spring in the cave. Naegleria Fowleri has been found in the hot spring water, a potentially fatal parasitic amoeba common in warm and springs.

== See also ==
- List of hot springs in the United States
- List of hot springs in the world
