= Soda Dam Hot Spring =

Thermal spring in New Mexico, United States

- Soda Dam; Jemez Springs Soda Dam
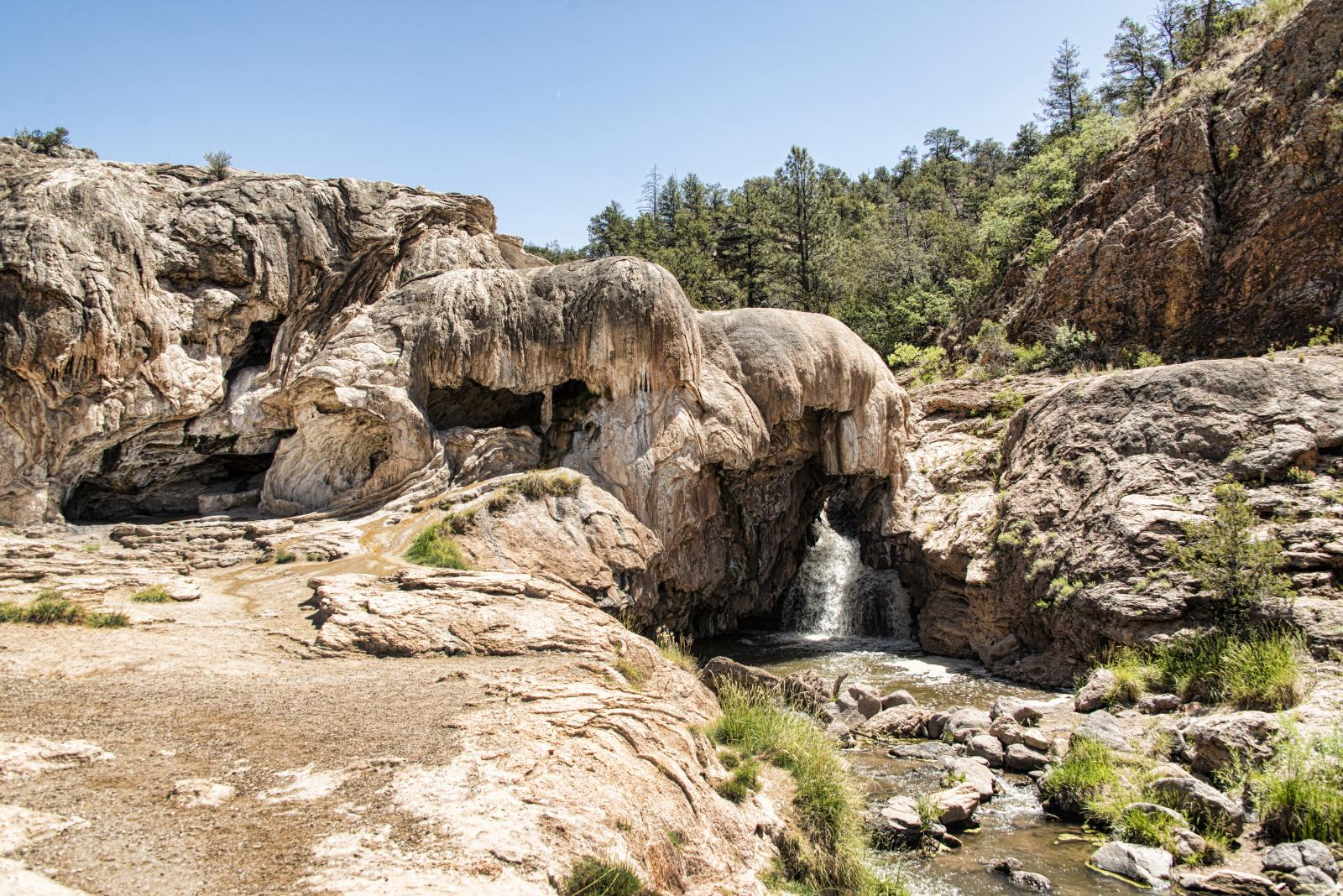
- Interactive map of Soda Dam Hot Spring
- Location: near the town of Jemez Springs, NM
- Coordinates: 35°47′40″N 106°41′12″W
- Elevation: 6,332 ft (1,930 m)
- Type: volcanic
- Temperature: 117 °F (47 °C)

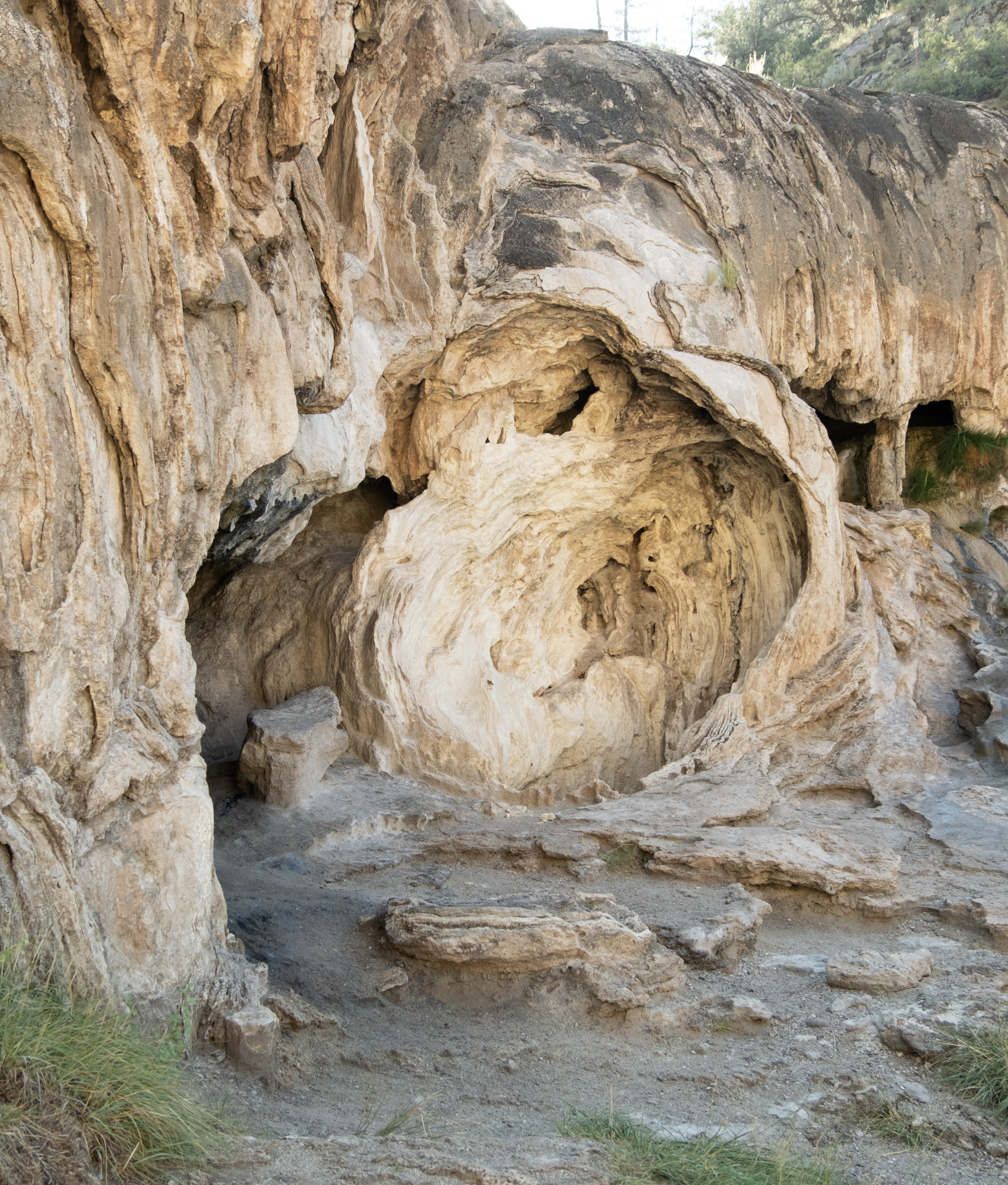
Calcium Carbonate Travertine deposits at Soda Dam Hot Spring

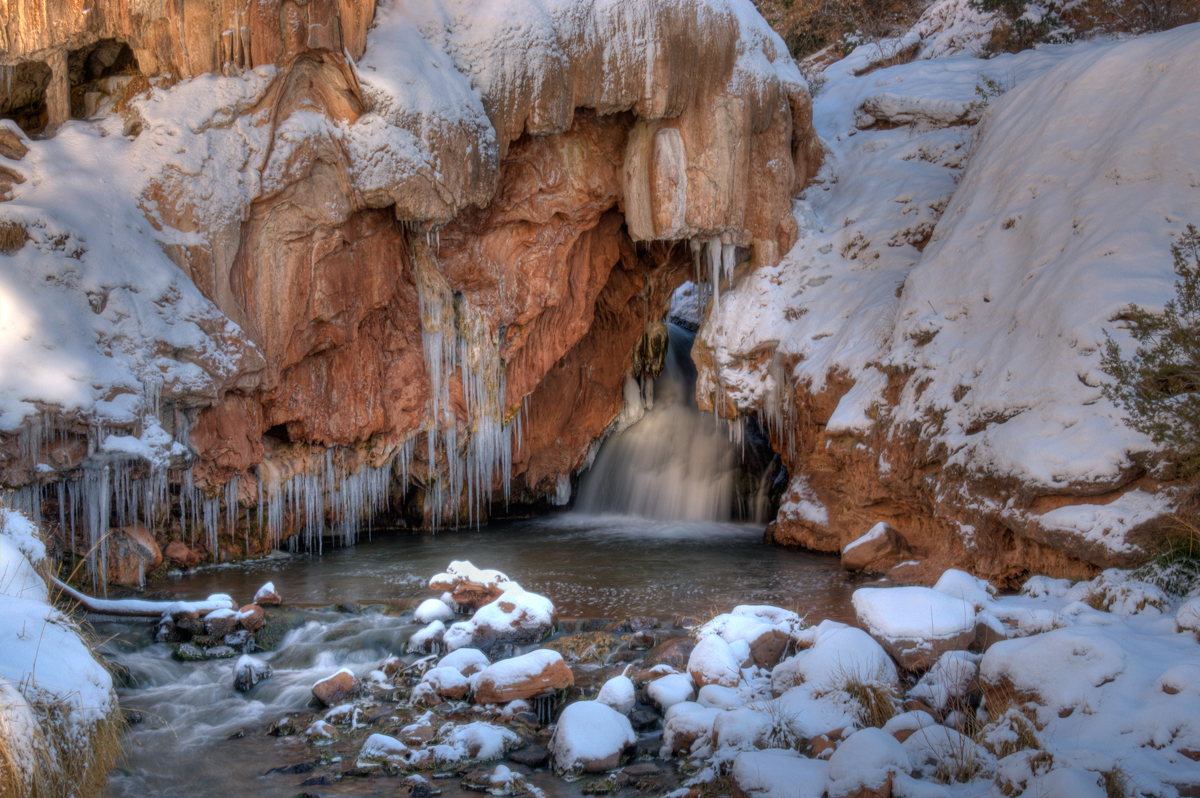
Soda Dam on Jemez Creek in winter

The Soda Dam Hot Spring, also known as the Jemez Springs Soda Dam or simply Soda Dam, is a grouping of fifteen hot springs which have formed a unique calcium carbonate and travertine formation creating a bridge over the Jemez River in Northern New Mexico.

== Geology ==
The Soda Dam was formed by calcium carbonate and travertine deposits from the thermal spring water that was built up over the course of 7,000 years. The river flows through the dome-like bridge created by the deposition of these minerals across the river. There is also a waterfall at the site, over 300 feet long, 50 feet high, and 50 feet wide at the base.

The hot spring water is heated by volcanic magma of the Valles Caldera. The water percolates through shale and limestone, following cracks in the Jemez geological fault zone to emerge at the springs. Because algal filaments are contained within the carbonate rock, the site is used to study ways in which possible ancient life on Mars may be detected through examination of rocks. The hot spring water emerges from several sources and seeps.

When State Highway 4 was built, part of the travertine dam was removed. The remaining portion is East of the highway.

== History ==
The springs were used by local indigenous people before the arrival of settlers. Artifacts and archaeological finds have been discovered at Jemez Cave near Soda Dam; evidence of human use as long ago as 2,500 B.C. In addition to the cave, several rock shelters can be found in the area. In the 1930s, extensive archaeological materials were found in the area around Soda Dam, and it was determined that the area has been used for over 2,000 years by several cultures.

In the 1960s, New Mexico state highway #4 was built which involved blasting the rock to build the road. The course of the spring water changed at that time, and now most of it flows into ditches on either side of the road. Some of the springs stopped flowing entirely.

== Water profile ==
The maximum water temperature of the spring system is 117 °F (47 °C).

== Location ==
The geographic coordinates are N 35.79445 W 106.68669.

== See also ==
- List of hot springs in the United States
- List of hot springs in the world
