= Burleson =

Burleson is surname, which may refer to:

== People ==
=== Government ===
- Albert S. Burleson (1863–1937), American postmaster general and congressman
- Carl Burleson, American government official
- Omar Burleson (1906–1991), American lawyer and congressman
- Wade Burleson (born 1961), American politician and author

=== Military ===
- Edward Burleson (1798–1851), American general and statesman
- Willard Burleson (born 1965), U.S. Army general

=== Sports ===
==== Baseball ====
- Alec Burleson (born 1998), American baseball player
- Rick Burleson (born 1951), American baseball player

==== Basketball ====
- Kevin Burleson (born 1979), American basketball player
- Tommy Burleson (born 1952), American basketball player

==== Football (gridiron) ====
- Al Burleson (born 1954), American football player
- Jesse Burleson (born c. 1976), American college football coach
- John Burleson (1909–1983), American football player
- Nate Burleson (born 1981), Canadian-American football player

==== Other sports ====
- Dick Burleson (born 1948), American motorcycle racer
- Dyrol Burleson (born 1940), American middle-distance runner
- Luther Burleson (1880–1924), American college sports coach

=== Other ===
- Davis Burleson (born 2003), American social media personality
- Derick Burleson (1963–2016), American academic and writer
- Dustin Burleson (born 1979), American orthodontist
- Geoffrey Burleson, American pianist
- Hugh L. Burleson (1865–1933), American bishop in the Episcopal Church
- Jane Walker Burleson (1888–1957), American socialite and suffragette
- Jay Burleson, American filmmaker
- Pete Burleson (1848–1925), American rancher, farmer, and lawman
- Rufus Columbus Burleson (1823–1901), American educator and president of Baylor University

== Places ==
All in the United States

- Burleson, Texas, a city in Johnson and Tarrant counties
- Burleson County, Texas
- Old Burleson, Alabama, an unincorporated community in Franklin County

== Other uses ==
- Burleson LLP, an American former law firm
- Burleson College, a former college located in Greenville, Texas, U.S.
- Burleson High School, in Burleson, Texas, U.S.
- USS Burleson (APA-67), a former attack transport ship of the U.S. Navy

== See also ==
- Burlison (disambiguation)
