= List of New Mexico Wildlife Management Areas =

New Mexico Wildlife Management Areas are protected areas in the US state of New Mexico managed by the New Mexico Department of Game and Fish (NMDGF). The state is divided into four wildlife management zones (WMZ).

== List of New Mexico Wildlife Management Areas ==
The state is divided into four wildlife management zones (WMZ).

=== Northwest Area ===
- Bernardo Wildlife Management Area: 1,675 acres (678 ha).
- Bluebird Mesa Wildlife Management Area: 160 acres (65 ha) purchased in 1953.
- Edward Sargent Wildlife Management Area: 20,209 acres (8,178 ha) purchased in 1975.
- Hammond Tract Wildlife Management Area: 80 acres (32 ha) of excess (surplus) Bureau of Reclamation transferred June 11, 1987.
- Jackson Lake Wildlife Management Area: 840 acres (340 ha) along the La Plata River and includes Jackson Lake.
- La Joya Wildlife Area: 3,405 acres (1,378 ha) purchased in parcels until 1940.
- Marquez/LBar WildlifeManagement Area: estimated 70,000 acres (28,000 ha) with the addition of the 54,000 acres (22,000 ha) of LBar property purchased in 2021 by the Trust for Public Land, with funding from Walmart's Acres for America program.
- Navajo Dam Wildlife Area (Navajo WMA): 3,785 acres (1,532 ha) surrounding Navajo Lake.
- Pine River Wildlife Management Area: 34.2 acres (13.8 ha).
- Retherford Wildlife Management Area: 72.3 acres (29.3 ha)
- Rio Chama Wildlife Management Area: 13,239 acres (5,358 ha) purchased from 1953.
  - Rio Chama Fishing Easement:
- San Juan Fishing Easement
- W.A. Humphries Wildlife Management Area: 10,950 acres (4,430 ha) purchased beginning in 1966.
- Water Canyon Wildlife Management Area: 2,840 acres (1,150 ha).

=== Northeast Area ===
- Charette Lakes Wildlife Management Area: 1,901 acres (769 ha).
- Colin Neblett Wildlife Area: 33,116 acres (13,402 ha).
- Elliott Barker Wildlife Management Area: 5,416 acres (2,192 ha).
- McAllister Lake Wildlife Management Area: 623 acres (252 ha).
- Bert Clancy WMA / Pecos River Complex: 1,967 acres (796 ha) spread out into the Bert Clancy, Mora, Tererro, and Jamie Koch areas along the Pecos River.
- Rio de los Pinos Wildlife Management Area: 848 acres (343 ha) located along the Rio de los Pinos River.
- Tres Piedras Wildlife Management Area: 3,260 acres (1,320 ha) purchased in 1940.
- Urraca Wildlife Management Area: 13,304 acres (5,384 ha) purchased in 1940.
- Wagon Mound Lake Wildlife Management Area: 850 acres (340 ha) including Salt Lake.
- Tucumcari Lake Wildlife Management Area: 702 acres (284 ha).
- Eagle Nest Wildlife Management Area: 999.9 acres (404.6 ha). Located due east of Eagle Nest Lake State Park and Eagle Nest Lake.

=== Southwest Area ===
- Bear Canyon Lake Wildlife Management Area: 75 acres (30 ha) purchased in 1949.
- Bill Evans Wildlife Management Area: 300 acres (120 ha) including the 62 acres (25 ha) Bill Evans Lake purchased in 1972.
- Glenwood Allred Wildlife Management Area: 107 acres (43 ha).
- Heart Bar Wildlife Management Area: 797 acres (323 ha) purchased in 1951
- Lake Roberts Wildlife Management Area: 79 acres (32 ha).
- Mimbres River Tract: 23 acres (9.3 ha) purchased in 1985 for habitat protection of the Chihuahua chub.
- Red Rock Wildlife Management Area: 1,530 acres (620 ha) purchased in 1960.
- Socorro-Escondida Wildlife Management Area: 94 acres (38 ha).
- Double E Ranch Wildlife Management Area: 23,000 acres (9,300 ha).
- River Ranch Wildlife Management Area: 1,010 acres (410 ha).
- San Simon Cienega Wildlife Management Area: Approximately 5,000 acres (2,000 ha) in the WMA of the total 47,027 acres (19,031 ha) of habitat in New Mexico and Arizona. Purchased in 1966 as habitat for the Mexican duck (Anas diazi).

=== Southeast Area ===
- Sandhills Prairie Conservation Area: 5,285 acres (2,139 ha).
- Prairie Chicken Wildlife Management Areas: 21,621 acres (8,750 ha) purchased in 1940 for habitat of the Lesser prairie chicken.
- W.S. Huey Wildlife Management Area: 2,880 acres (1,170 ha) as habitat loss mitigation as a result of the Brantley Dam.
