= St. James Hotel (Cimarron, New Mexico) =

Historic hotel

Coordinates: 36°30′18″N 104°55′14″W

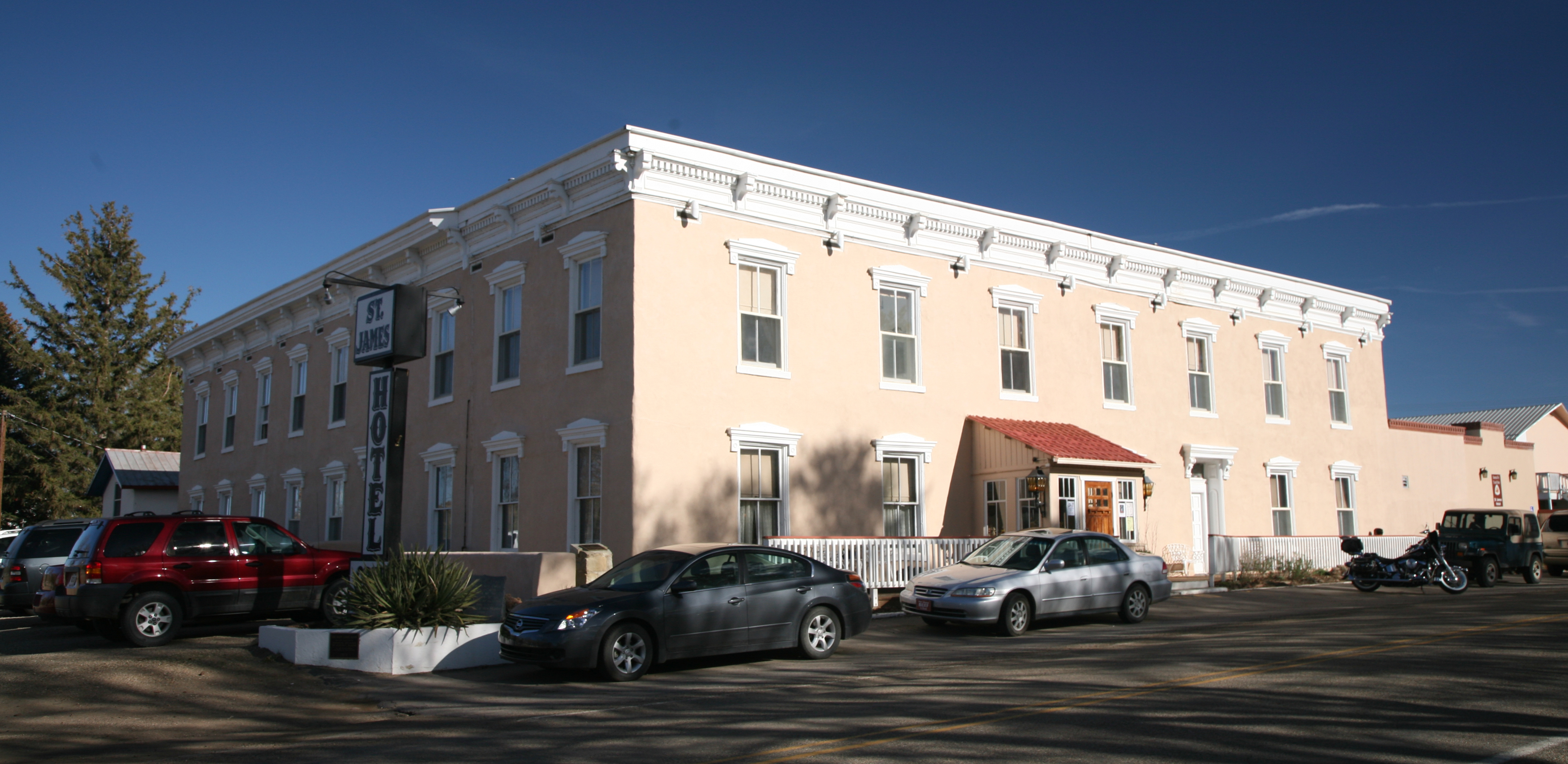

General information
- Architectural style: Spanish Colonial
- Location: Cimarron, New Mexico, United States
- Completed: 1872

The St. James Hotel, located in historic downtown Cimarron, New Mexico, is a historic hotel, restaurant and saloon. Today, guests can stay at the historic hotel, in either the historic section (main building with bar and restaurant) or in a modern addition (new building). The hotel is in the National Register of Historic Places and is part of the Cimarron Historic District.

== History ==
The St. James was first built in 1872, on the recommendation of U.S. President Ulysses S. Grant, by Henri (later Henry) Lambert, personal chef to President Abraham Lincoln. Lambert moved west and settled in Elizabethtown, New Mexico, with hopes of making a wealthy strike. When he found little gold, he opened a restaurant and saloon. At this time, Elizabethtown, Cimarron, and much of the surrounding area was owned by Lucien B. Maxwell and was a part of the huge Maxwell Land Grant. Maxwell enticed Lambert to come to Cimarron, whereupon he founded the Lambert Inn, which would later be renamed the St. James.

In its day, the St. James was visited by many famous lawmen and notorious outlaws and was the scene of many murders. A favorite saying in the area became "It appears Lambert had himself another man for breakfast." and the usual question around Cimarron was "Who was killed at Lambert's last night?" Wyatt Earp, his brother Morgan Earp, and their wives stayed at the Inn on their way to Tombstone, Arizona. Jesse James always stayed in Room 14. Buffalo Bill Cody stayed at the Inn and took an entire village of Native Americans living nearby on the road with his show. The outlaw Davy Crockett, a descendant of the original Davy Crockett, killed three Buffalo Soldiers inside the hotel's bar room in 1876. Other notable customers were Clay Allison, Black Jack Ketchum, and Annie Oakley.

In 1901, when Henry Lambert's sons replaced the roof of the St. James, they found many bullet holes. A double layer of hard wood stopped anyone sleeping upstairs from being killed. Today, the dining room ceiling still holds some twenty bullet holes.

The St. James fell into disrepair after the railroad came through and effectively killed the Santa Fe trail, as the gold in the area moreover dwindled. From 1926–1985, the hotel passed from owner to owner, but in 1985 it was restored to its former glory.

In January 2009 the hotel was purchased by the Express UU Bar Ranch; a property of Express Ranches (headquartered in Yukon, Oklahoma). Following extensive renovations where the formal dining room and bar were merged into one large area and the outside deck and lawn became a walled-in courtyard and patio complete with a fountain, the hotel was re-opened on June 22, 2009.

On September 1, 2024, the hotel announced via its Facebook page that it would permanently close its doors on September 16, 2024.

On December 19, 2024, it was announced the hotel and restaurant would reopen with new owners on December 20, 2024. The restaurant will now feature “Old Western” and “Classic New Mexican” dishes.

== Notable rooms ==
- 14: Jesse James' room.
- 17: Mary Lambert's room
