= Davy Crockett (outlaw) =

American outlaw

- Born: David Crockett c. 1853; Tennessee, United States
- Died: September 30, 1876 (aged 22–23); Cimarron, New Mexico, New Mexico Territory
- Occupation: Cowboy
- Known for: Outlaw relative of famed American frontiersman Davy Crockett
- Parents: Andrew Crockett (father); Mary Danley (mother)

Davy Crockett (c. 1853 – September 30, 1876) was an American outlaw and a relative of the famed frontiersman of the same name, Davy Crockett.

== Biography ==
Davy Crockett was born to Andrew Crockett and Mary (Danley) Crockett in Tennessee, but the family moved to central Texas, where Andrew operated a toll bridge across the Brazos River, when Davy was still a boy. According to differing accounts, Crockett was either a grandson or grandnephew of the better-known Crockett.

When he was grown, Crockett went to New Mexico Territory with a friend named Peter Burleson and established a ranch near Cimarron, which at the time was a small, but wild, cowtown. At first, Crockett maintained a good relationship with the people of Cimarron, but his quarrelsome partner, Agustus "Gus" Heffron, led him astray. Eventually, Crockett and Heffron became the leading bullies in town.

Local folklore says that Crockett was a member of a lynch mob headed by Clay Allison who killed the Elizabethtown serial killer, Charles Kennedy, in 1870. However, Crockett's presence during the lynching remains debatable. Crockett, after doing many crimes, was sent to jail in 1872 after which he later escaped.

=== Murders at the St. James Hotel ===
Crockett's ongoing stint as an outlaw reached its peak in 1876, after he murdered three Buffalo Soldiers from the United States Army's 9th Cavalry inside the bar of the St. James Hotel. There are two differing accounts of the hotel shooting and Crockett's demise; the first, which is substantiated by contemporary newspapers, is the generally accepted version. The second comes from the Crockett family history and is remarkably different.

According to the generally accepted version, on the night of March 24, 1876, Crockett, Heffron, and a friend named Henry Goodman were touring Cimarron's saloons and gambling halls when they decided to go home to their ranch. Before leaving, however, they stopped at the St. James Hotel to purchase a bottle of whiskey for the ride.

After purchasing the whiskey, Crockett headed to the door, but he had trouble opening it because someone was attempting to enter from the outside. When he finally did get the door opened, Crockett found himself standing in front of a Buffalo Soldier. Already drunk, and no doubt annoyed, Crockett pulled out his revolver and shot the man. He then whirled around and fired into three other soldiers who were playing cards at a table in the bar. Three of the soldiers, Privates George Small, Anthony Harvey, and John Hanson, were killed and an unnamed trooper was wounded.

Crockett fled the town and hid at a nearby ranch. He remained at large for the next few months until making arrangements for a favorable hearing before a sympathetic justice of the peace. Ultimately, Crockett was acquitted because he was drunk and therefore unable to control himself. He was also fined $50 for carrying a gun in town.

=== Death ===
Crockett's acquittal for the murders of the soldiers is said to have led to his antics becoming intolerable. According to author Leon Claire Metz, Crockett and Heffron "terrorized Cimarron's peaceful population with sporadic gunshots, rambunctious behavior, and brazen threats." Often, Crockett would ride his horse inside a building and fire into the ceiling or force people at gunpoint to perform services for him, such as shining boots. Metz writes that on one occasion Crockett forced the sheriff, Isaiah Rinehart, at gunpoint to drink until he was incapacitated. He also says that one time Crockett bought a suit and had the bill sent to Rinehart's house.

Rinehart's version of events was that he formed a posse composed of him, a rancher named Joseph Holbrook, and the town postmaster, John McCullough. All three were armed with double-barreled shotguns. On September 30, 1876, the so-called posse (Crockett and Heffron were not fugitives or as far as they knew even wanted by the law) took up concealed positions near a barn where Crockett and Heffron usually left their horses. According to the account given by the three members of the ambush/posse, at about 9:00 PM, Crockett and Heffron approached the barn on horseback, ignored a call to put their hands up, and were shot without returning fire. A wounded Crocket was allegedly carried away on his bolting horse as it galloped out of town. The posse asserted they had found his dead body on the other side of the Cimarron River, about a quarter of a mile away from town, yet still on his horse with his hands locked in a "death grip" on the saddle horn. Wounded in the arm and head, Heffron was taken to jail, and held in custody although it is not clear what the charge was; he supposedly escaped a month later, and was never heard from again.

=== Crockett family history ===
The Crockett family has a largely different version of Davy's demise that has been passed down through the generations. According to Andrew Jackson Crockett, one of Davy's nephews, Rinehart wanted Crockett's horse and when he refused to give it up the former accused the latter of horse theft. Afraid of confronting him on his own, Rinehart had some Buffalo Soldiers attempt to make an arrest, but Crockett killed three of them and escaped. Sometime later, Rinehart and another man ambushed Crockett as he was leaving town and shot him in the back, which killed Crockett.

=== Interment ===
Crockett was buried in the town cemetery, though it lacked a marker for many years. Although there is currently a marker for Crockett, whether it is placed over the correct grave is uncertain.

== See also ==
- List of fugitives from justice who disappeared
- List of Old West gunfighters
