= Eagle Nest Lake State Park =

State park in New Mexico, United States

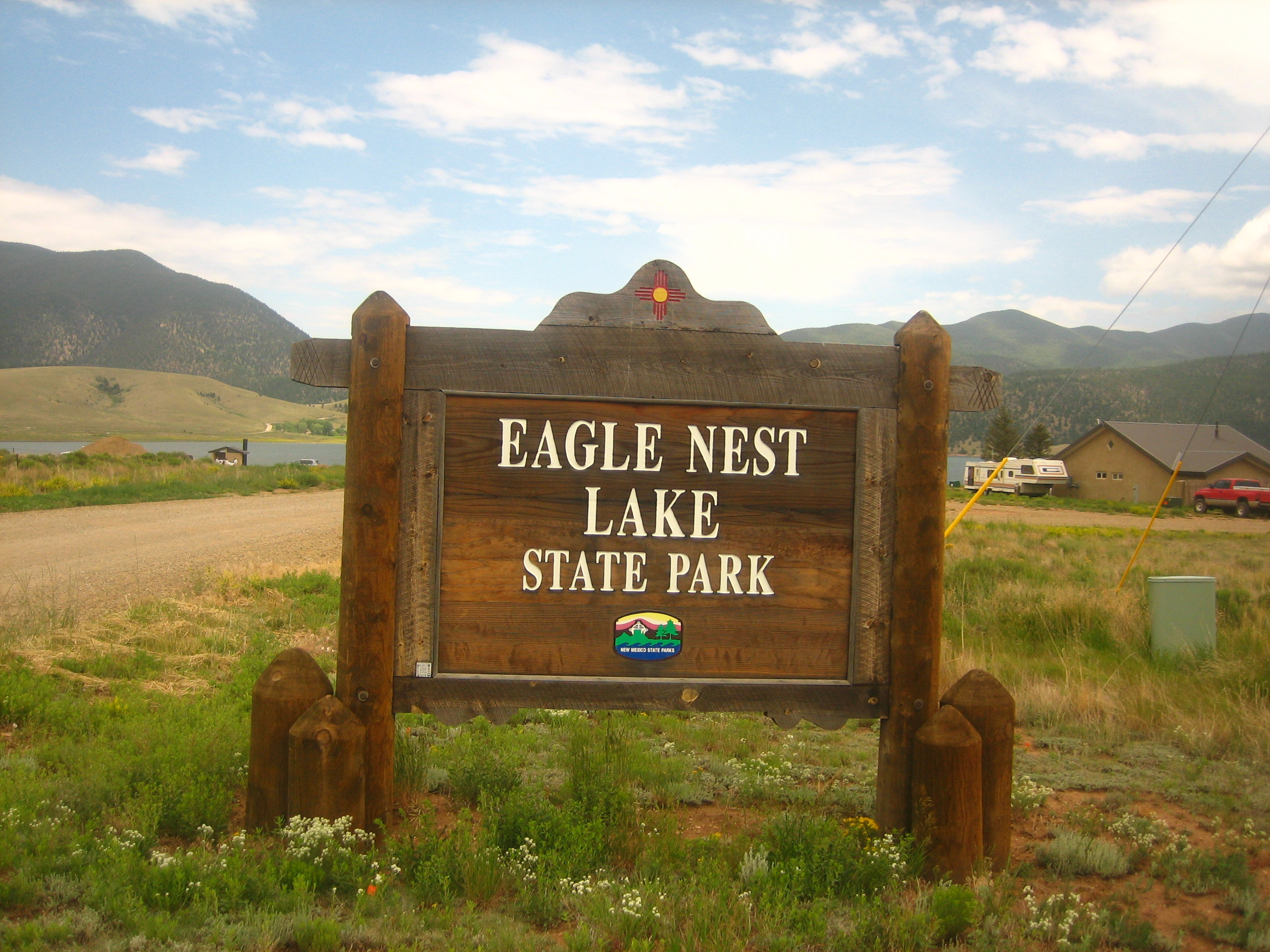

- Location within New Mexico
- Location: Colfax County, New Mexico, United States
- Coordinates: 36°31′58″N 105°15′54″W
- Area: 3,488 acres (1,412 ha)
- Elevation: 8,300 ft (2,500 m)
- Established: 2004
- Administrator: New Mexico Energy, Minerals and Natural Resources Department
- Website: Official website

Eagle Nest Lake State Park is a state park in New Mexico, United States, located outside Eagle Nest, approximately 30 miles (48 km) east of Taos. It was established on July 3, 2004. Its main attraction is a 2,400-acre (970 ha) lake which is popular for fishing and boating in summer, and ice fishing, cross-country skiing and snowshoeing in winter.

The lake itself is a man-made reservoir created when the Cimarron River was impounded by the Eagle Nest Dam in 1918. Before this, the St. Louis, Rocky Mountain and Pacific Railway did some grading work in 1907 on an unfinished extension from its terminus at Ute Park to Taos, including boring a tunnel here.

The lake is home to several species of fish, including rainbow trout, brown trout, kokanee salmon, yellow perch, common carp, white sucker, and northern pike, which were introduced into Eagle Nest Lake (by law, anglers must harvest/keep pike, because of their threat to the lake's gamefish populations).

Eagle Nest Lake is at an elevation of 8,300 feet (2,500 m), making it an alpine lake, and it is situated in a glacial valley on the slopes of Wheeler Peak, New Mexico's highest mountain. The surrounding mountains are rich in wildlife such as elk, deer, turkeys and bears.

== Gallery ==
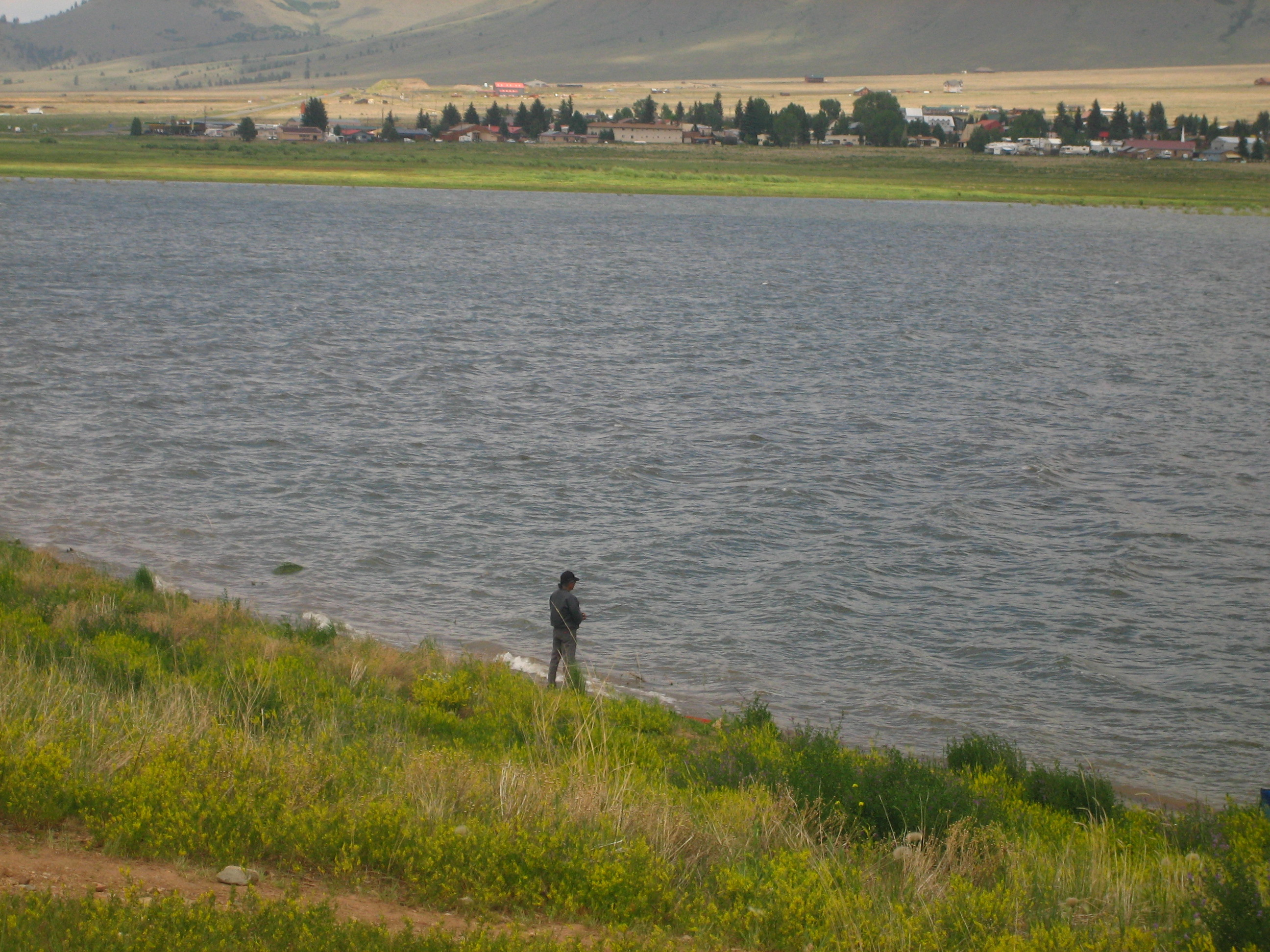
Lone fisherman at Eagle Nest Lake State Park

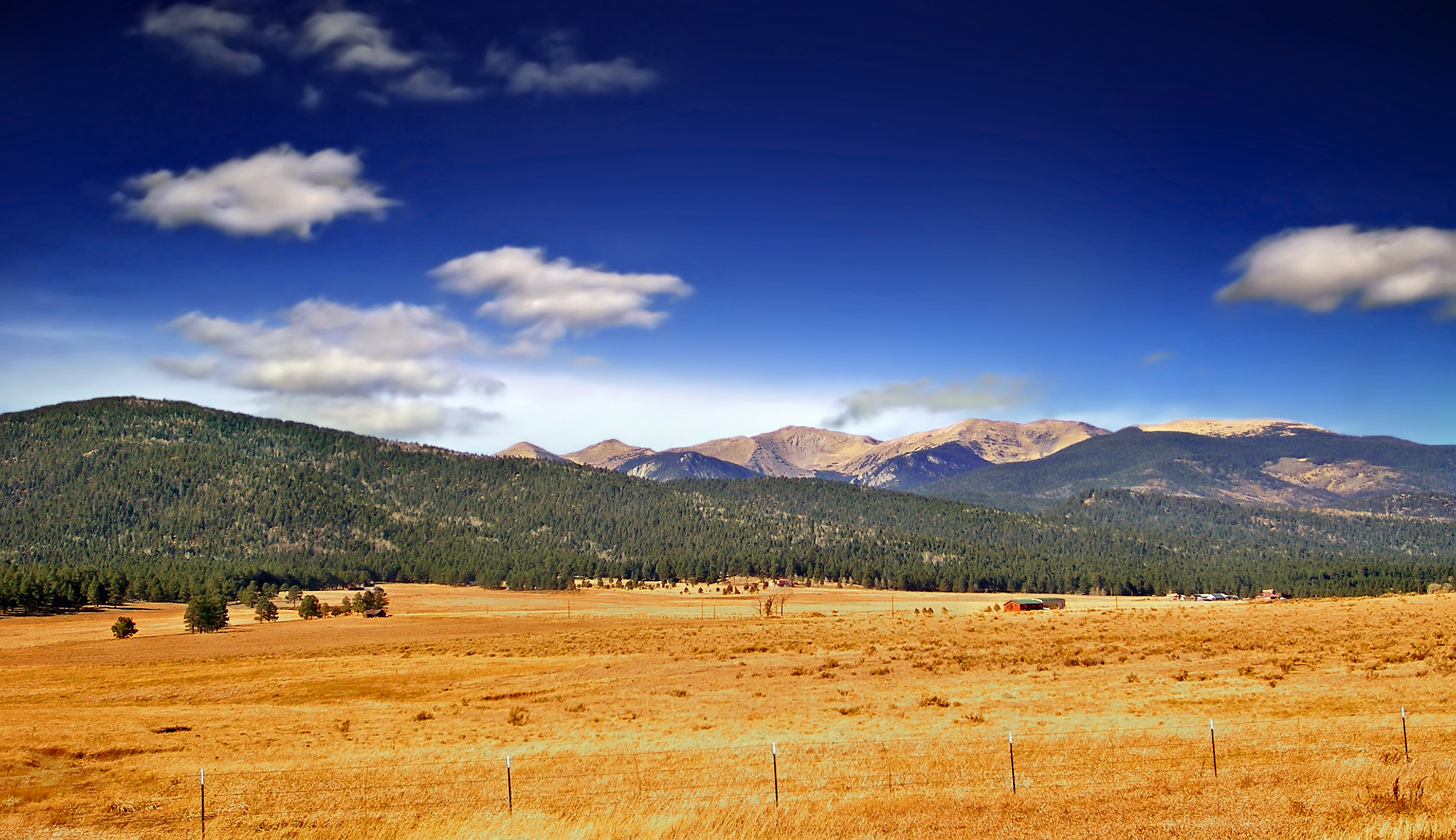
View of Wheeler Peak from Eagle Nest

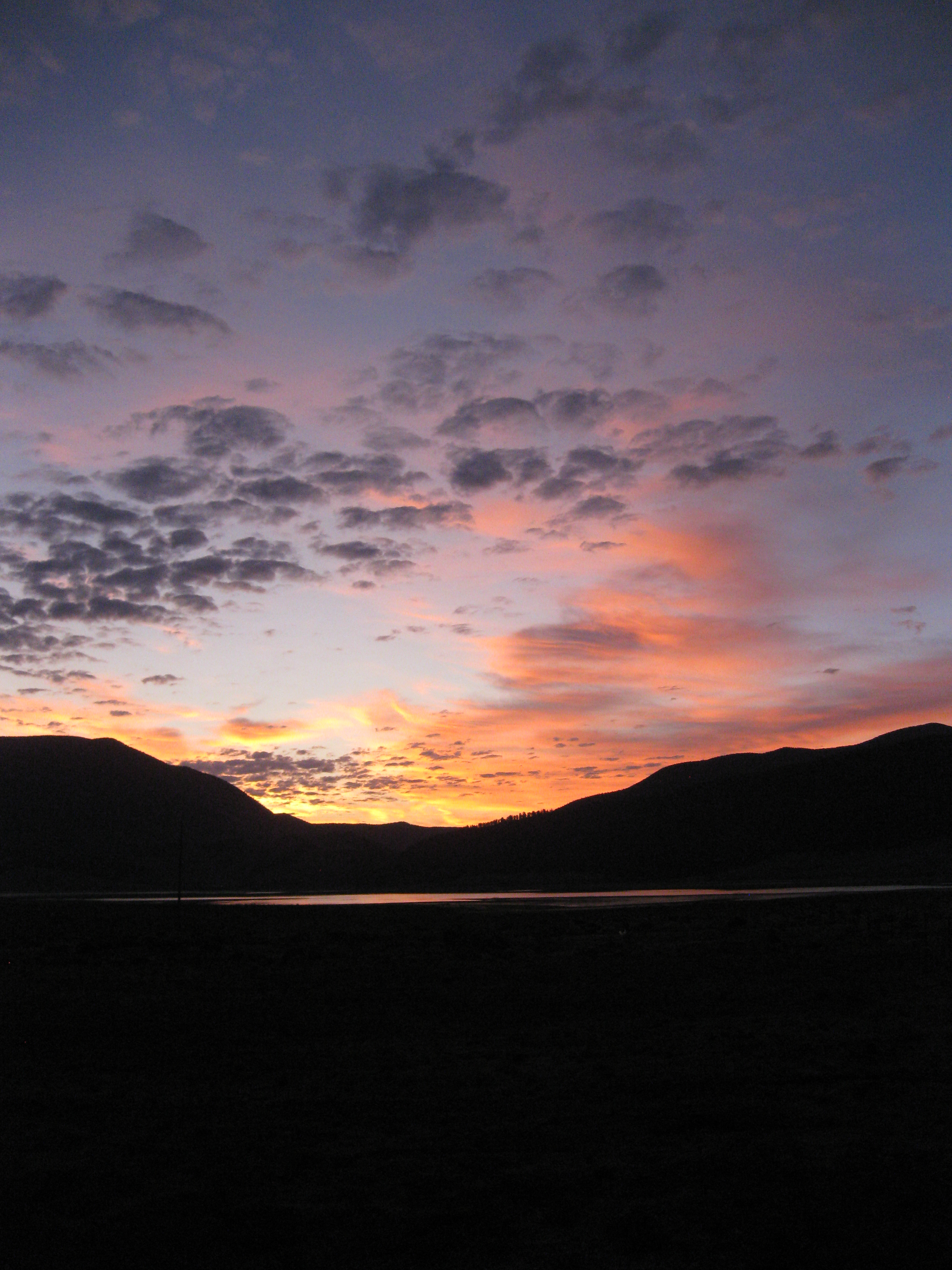
Sunrise at Eagle Nest Lake
