= Palisades Sill (New Mexico) =

Biogeography and geology of Cimarron River Basin

Coordinates: 36°32′12″N 105°10′30″W

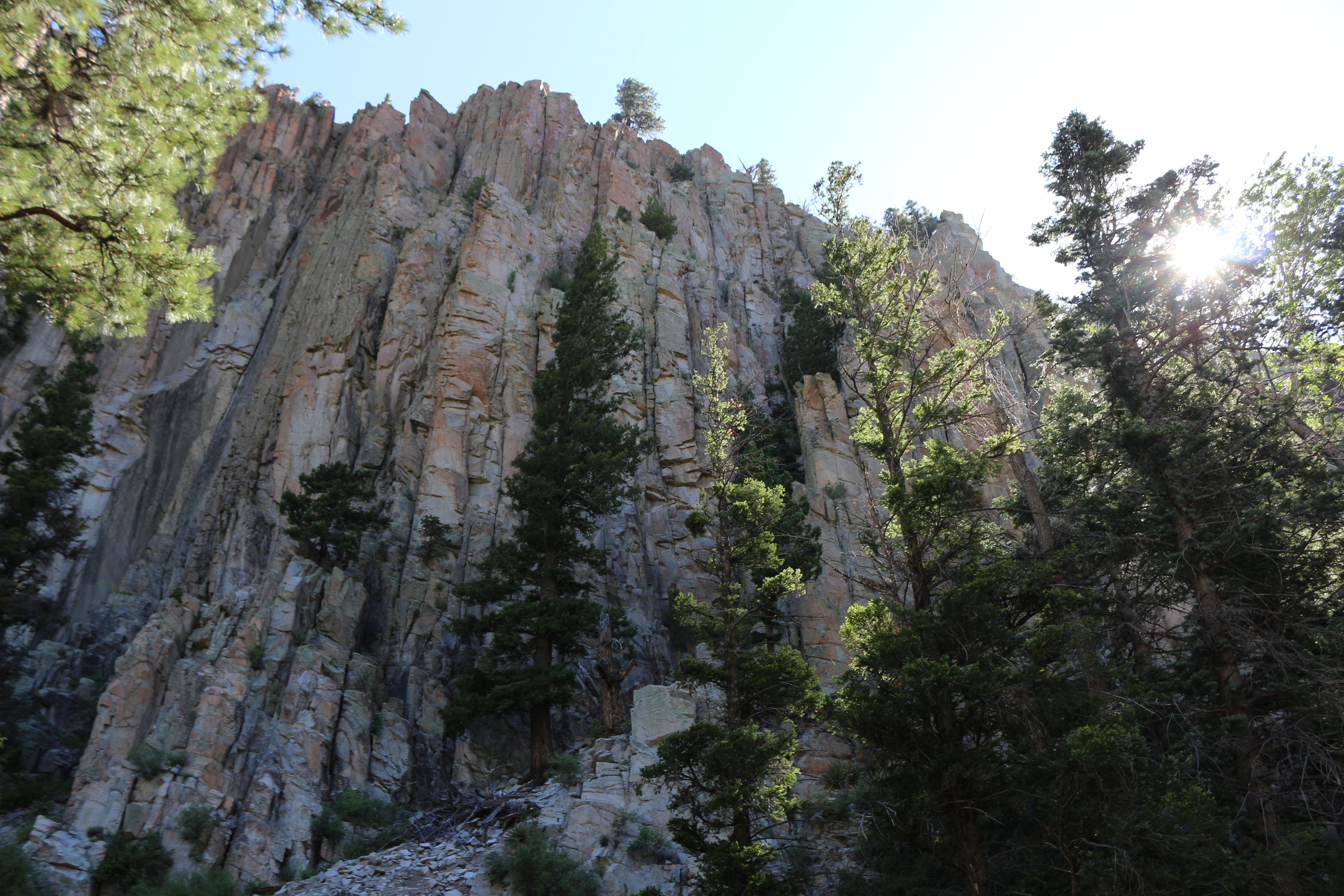
Palisades Sill in New Mexico in 2017.

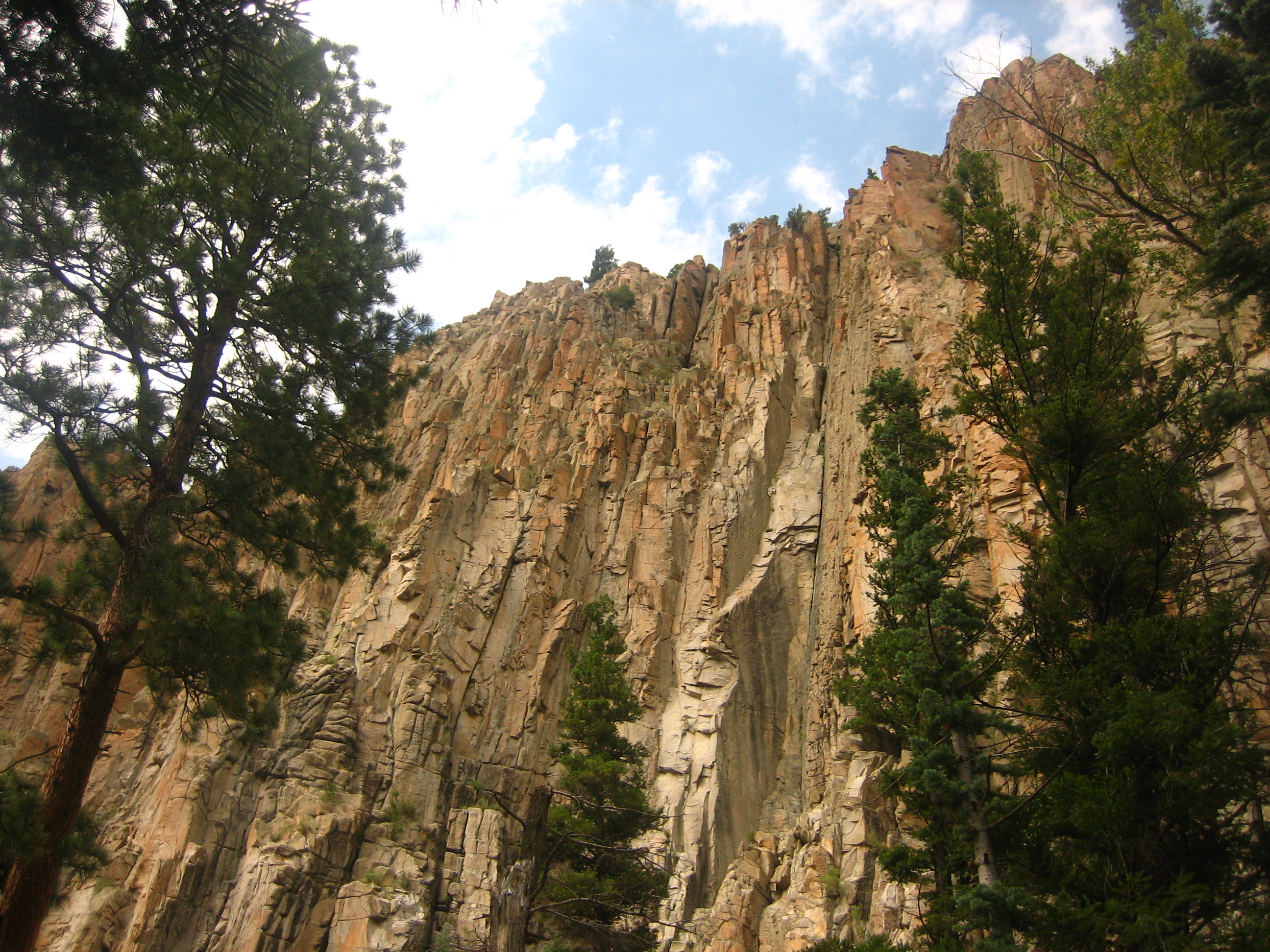
Cliffs of Palisades Sill

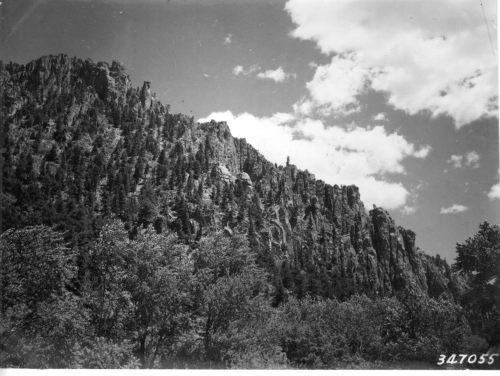
Palisades Sill of the Cimarron River Canyon

The Palisades Sill is a fine-grained porphyritic dacite sill which forms spectacular cliffs and palisades in the Cimarron River canyon between Eagle Nest and Cimarron in northern New Mexico. It can be seen in the eastern part of Cimarron Canyon State Park.
