= Burlison =

Burlison may refer to:

== People with the surname ==
- Bill Burlison (1931–2019), American lawyer and politician
- Bob Burlison, English footballer
- Eric Burlison (born 1976), American politician
- Paul Burlison (1929–2003), American rockabilly guitarist
- Thomas Henry Burlison (1936–2008), British footballer and trades unionist

== Places ==
- Burlison, Tennessee, United States

== See also ==
- Burleson (disambiguation)
