= Eagle Nest Dam =

- U.S. National Register of Historic Places
- NM State Register of Cultural Properties
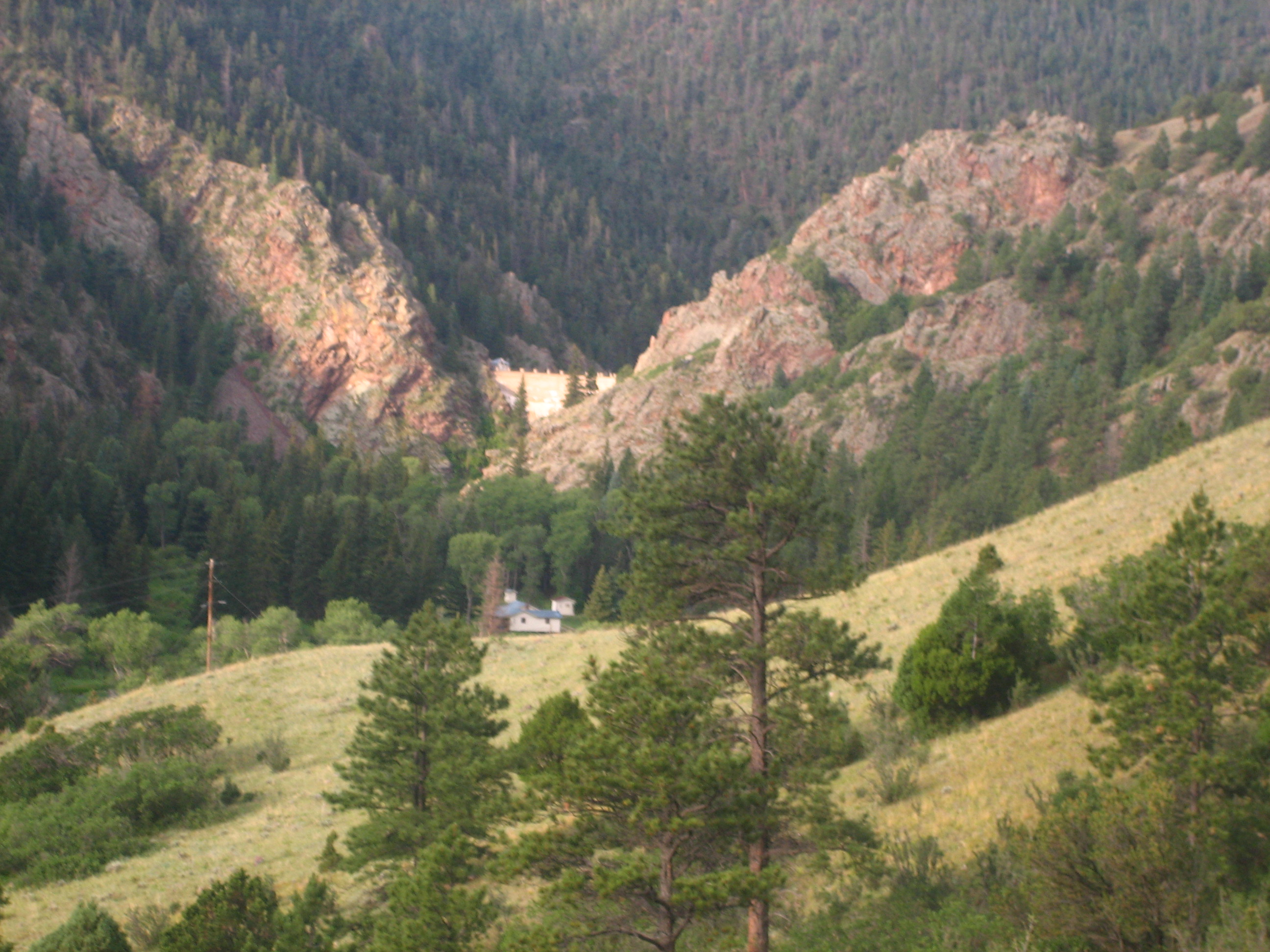
- Eagle Nest Dam

- Location within New Mexico
- Nearest city: Eagle Nest, New Mexico
- Coordinates: 36°31′54″N 105°13′44″W
- Area: 2,500 acres (1,000 ha)
- Built: 1920
- Architect: Willis Ranney
- NRHP reference No.: 79001537
- NMSRCP No.: 549

Significant dates
- Added to NRHP: April 18, 1979
- Designated NMSRCP: January 20, 1978

The Eagle Nest Dam is a dam just east of the town of Eagle Nest, New Mexico on U.S. Route 64. The dam, on private property, is on the Cimarron River, and is responsible for Eagle Nest Lake.

== History ==
In 1907, two wealthy ranchers, Frank Springer and Charles Springer, and the Cimarron Valley Land Company were granted a water permit to impound the water of the Cimarron River for irrigation by building a dam. Construction of the dam began in 1916, and continued until 1918. The dam is 140 feet (43 m) high and has an arc length of 400 feet (120 m). At the top, the dam is 9.5 feet (2.9 m) wide, and it is 45.2 feet (13.8 m) wide at the base. It is considered the largest privately built dam in the United States. The resulting lake, known as Eagle Nest Lake has an area of 2,500 acres (10 km^{2}; 3.9 sq mi) and measures 5 miles (8.0 km) long, and 2 miles (3.2 km) wide. The surface elevation of the water when the lake is at capacity is 8,172 feet (2,491 m) above sea level. The reservoir has a capacity of 79,120 acre-feet (97,590,000 m^{3}) of water. The dam was constructed by laborers from the Taos Pueblo. It is named Eagle Nest Dam for the eagles that made themselves a home on the sides of the dam. The dam sits between two granite walls, and as part of the plans, the Springers had to reroute U.S. Route 64 to its current location, over McAvoy Hill.

== Water rights ==
To help finance the dam, Springer sold some water rights from Eagle Nest Lake to local farmers and ranchers. These original rights are known as vested rights. In 1951, the State of New Mexico adjudicated the watershed of the Cimarron River. This adjudication confirmed Springer's original permit which gave him the right to store surplus and flood water in the Eagle Nest Lake. There were many other court cases, and one of them ended up in the New Mexico State Supreme Court in 1990.

Today, Eagle Nest Lake still serves its intended purpose as a reservoir, which provides irrigation water via the Cimarron River and a complex canal system, to many farmers and ranchers, some as far as 50 miles downstream. Some of the water rights from Eagle Nest Lake have been purchased by local municipalities including Raton and Springer. The villages of Angel Fire, Eagle Nest, and Cimarron can also get their water from the lake.

== State ownership ==
In 2002, the State of New Mexico bought the lake, and it is now operated by the New Mexico Interstate Stream Commission (ISC), but owners maintained their water rights. After New Mexico bought the lake, various water users approached Governor Bill Richardson in hopes of mediation to end the litigation over water rights. Governor Richardson and the local governing bodies signed the Eagle Nest Water Rights Settlement on June 2, 2006. This settlement specifies that all users share in water shortages. The sharing arrangement is prorated based on the amount of water in the lake on June 1 of each year. All users will be treated equally, including the so-called Tier-Two users who make bulk water purchases. The agreement can be viewed on the web. The state established the Eagle Nest Lake State Park for use of the lake for recreational purposes.

== See also ==
- Palo Flechado Pass
- Cimarron Canyon State Park
- National Register of Historic Places listings in Colfax County, New Mexico
