= Casa del Gavilan =

Historic house in New Mexico, United States

Coordinates: 36°26′9.9″N 104°58′38.1″W

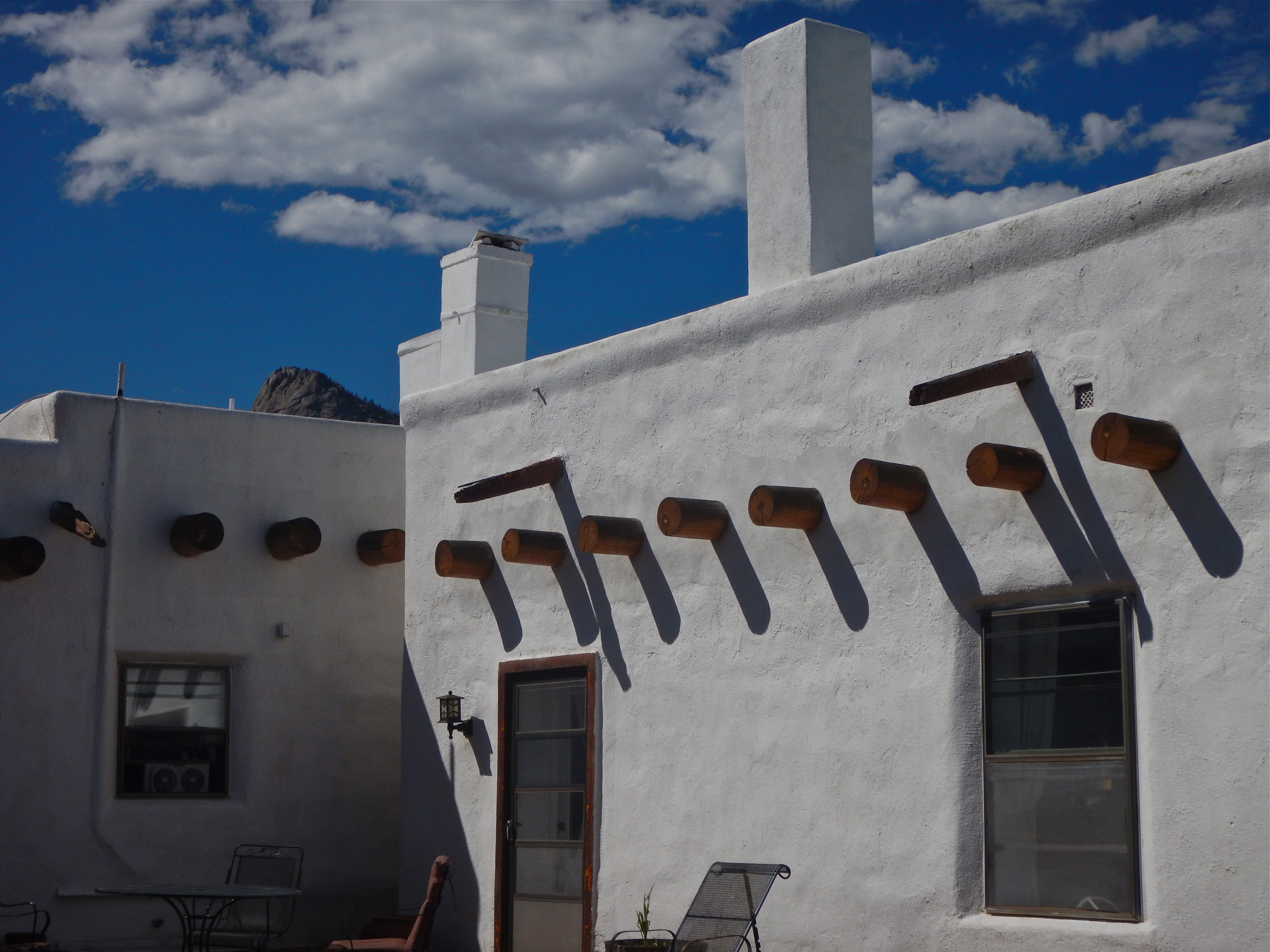

The Casa del Gavilan is a historic bed and breakfast located six miles south of Cimarron, New Mexico. The property is at the base of Urraca Mesa and is surrounded by the property of Philmont Scout Ranch. The bed and breakfast has six guest rooms. The Casa del Gavilan is also referred to as The Nairn Place due to its original owners.

== History ==
The Casa del Gavilan (House of the Hawk) is an adobe villa built in 1911 for Connecticut natives Jack and Gertrude Nairn, who purchased the land in 1910 from George Webster. In the early 1940s the residence was used briefly as the headquarters of the UU Bar Ranch, then owned by Oklahoma oil magnate Waite Phillips.

Today, the Casa del Gavilan is owned by the Gavilan Limited Liability Company, of which several members have ties with the adjacent Philmont Scout Ranch. The property was listed on the New Mexico Register of Cultural Properties and the National Register of Historic Places in 2017.
