= Pete Burleson =

19th-Century Western Lawman

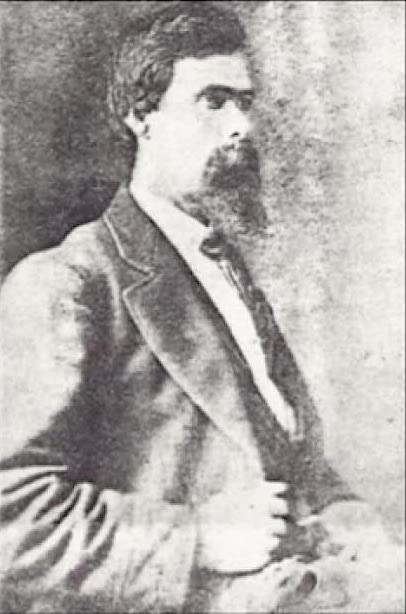
Pete Burleson

Pete Burleson (September 4, 1848 – December 6, 1925) was a cattle drover and rancher, western lawman, farmer and pioneer in the New Mexico Territory and State of New Mexico. He drove cattle from Texas as part of the 1870's I. W. Lacy - L. G. Coleman cattle drive, settling in northeast New Mexico as a cattle rancher near Cimarron. He was elected sheriff of Colfax County (1877–1871), serving in this capacity during the bloodiest part of the Colfax County War (1875–1894). In his tenure as sheriff and as a resident of Cimarron, he was close friends with several notorious cowboys including Clay Allison and David John (Davy) Crockett. Burleson was also a deputy sheriff in Colfax County and Lincoln County for seven different sheriffs, his last appointment coming at age 63. Western writers Eugene Manlove Rhodes and Emerson Hough both included characters in their novels and short stories based on Burleson.

== Early life ==
Burleson was born in Scott County, Mississippi, to Nathaniel Marion Burleson (1830–1862) and Louisa Walters (1834–1914). He moved to Texas at an early age where in 1862 he was happened upon by fellow rancher Robert. H. Williams in the Bandera, Texas region during the theft of Burleson's and Williams' horses. By this time Pete Burleson was skilled horseman and cowboy.

== Life in Colfax County ==
=== Ranching in Cimarron ===
Burleson left Texas in 1873 as part of a Lacy-Coleman cattle drive along with Clay Allison and Davy Crockett, settling in Cimarron to raise cattle. Burleson's wife, Mary Eunicia Chittenden Burleson (1862–1938), recalled that her husband came to Cimarron at the head of 1500 cattle and "settled on a place on the Red River, built a two-room log cabin and settled down to raising cattle."

=== Colfax County War ===
There are a number of political and economic facets associated with the war. One of the main ones was occupancy and ownership of the Maxwell Land Grant lands. Upon arrival in Cimarron, Burleson, Davy Crockett, Clay Allison, and others laid claim to lands that they believed to be public domain as the U. S. Department of the Interior had declared the land. Challenges as to the size and claims to the land grant resulted in at least five cases brought to the United States Supreme Court, who eventually ruled in favor of the grant owners. The ensuing struggle between the land owners and their political allies (i.e., the Santa Fe Ring) against the squatters spilled over into years of bloodshed with as many as 200 people being killed over the 15-year period of the war. Burleson sided with the squatters or anti-grant forces, aligning himself with his friend, Clay Allison.

=== Sheriff Burleson ===
Burleson's entry into local law enforcement came in 1875 when his future father-in-law, Sheriff O. K. Chittenden, deputized Burleson and Clay Allison's brother, John, to serve arrest warrants to county probate judge Dr. Robert H. Longwill, attorney Melvin M. Mills, and postal contractor Florencio Donoghue who had been implicated in the murder of Reverend Thomas J. Tolby. Tolby's murder served as a catalyst, fueling the passions of the Colfax County War. In a politically-charged maneuver, Sheriff Chittenden was removed from office in April 1876 by the Ring-controlled Territorial Governor, Samuel Axtell, in favor of Isaiah Rhinehart, a Ring ally.

Burleson was persuaded by O. K. Chittenden and Clay Allison to oppose Rhinehart in the November 1877 county election, which Burleson won by a large majority. His years as sheriff were characterized by the events and people that made Cimarron and Colfax County such a turbulent place. The Las Vegas Times best characterized 1870's Cimarron stating, “Everything is quiet at Cimarron. Nobody has been killed in three days.”

Sheriff Burleson's tenure was marked with a number of high-profile events. On March 27, 1878, Burleson and his deputies were involved in a shootout at Stepp's and Morgan's Saloon with outlaws Joe Hill, Bill May, and John Ringo (Dutch John). Burleson and Joe Hill were wounded and Deputy Doc Stokes was killed.

One month later, "Sheriff Peter Burleson was constrained to kill an Indian from the nearby reservation after the man became drunk and resisted arrest." The Las Vegas Gazette noted the Natives had beaten local resident Pablo Torres and abused his wife. This appears to be the first time Sheriff Burleson killed someone in the line of duty.

Two weeks later, in May 1878, Burleson conducted the first legal hanging in Colfax County, New Mexico Territory. William Breckenridge, a Buffalo Soldier from Fort Union, was convicted of killing a county resident and his twelve-year old son. Burleson had to appeal to the mob in Cimarron, seeking their own justice; he persuaded the gathered crowd to allow the sentence to be legally conducted.

In December 1878, Burleson served as one of the two New Mexico dignitaries selected to drive the railroad spike at the ceremony marking the entry of the Atchison, Topeka, and Santa Fe Railroad into New Mexico.

Burleson was re-elected in November 1879. In 1880 Sheriff Burleson and Deputy Mason "Mace" Bowman confronted Frank Coe and his cousin George Coe concerning tampering with local cattle. Dora Allison, Clay Allison's wife stated, “Pete and Mace [Bowman] had driven the Coe Gang from Colfax County, they being notorious pistoleros and cattle thieves.” In response to Cimarron residents pleas that he deal with Texas cowboys who had "hurrahed" the town, "[Sheriff] Burleson, Deputy Mason Bowman and a posse reportedly killed 4 Texans on 4 July 1880. The cowboys had terrorized Cimarron the previous night. The sheriff was wounded (again) in this last incident." Author J. S. Peters gives a more detailed account of the incident noting, "By this time the camp had turned into a minor battleground, but it was a short one also, over in seconds. Results, four Texans and one deputy dead, and a slight arm wound for Sheriff Burleson. The four cowboys were unknown."

Burleson did not run for a third term. He directed his energies toward ranching with his father-in-law and his growing family. Burleson did serve as a deputy sheriff to Mace Bowman in 1882.

== Lincoln County ==
Burleson left Colfax County in 1885 and took up residence and ranching in Socorro County, New Mexico Territory. His wife stated that his cattle ranching efforts were not successful and Burleson became a ranch manager for the American Valley Cattle Company based in Quemado. A few years later he moved to Lincoln County and became the ranch manager for the Angus VV Ranch, succeeding Pat Garrett. Author Roberta Key Haldane wrote of Burleson as "A man with much experience in cattle troubles," and for diffusing an potentially hostile situation in 1896 between the rival Block Ranch and Texas Park ranch hands. Area newspapers, The Lincoln Independent and The Santa Fe Daily New Mexican included articles attesting to Burleson's success as a ranch manager.

Sometime before 1895, Burleson began working for Susan McSween Barber's Three Rivers Ranch. Mrs. Barber was the widow of Alexander McSween who was killed in the Lincoln County War. By 1888, this 1000-acre ranch ran 8000 cattle, earning McSween Barber the title Cattle Queen of New Mexico.

With Burleson's end of ranch foreman duties, he settled in Lincoln beginning pursuits in new directions including operating a saloon, managing a hotel and becoming a fruit and vegetable farmer.

== Politics ==
Burleson made an entry into Lincoln County politics shortly after his arrival in 1890. The legacy of the Lincoln County Wars were still a recent memory and the Santa Fe Ring held sway in Lincoln politics until statehood in 1912.

Burleson's political activities ranged from small precinct level positions to leading the Democratic Central Committee for Lincoln County. In all of his Lincoln County political activities, he aligned himself with the Democratic Party. He was a regular appointee to the Democratic County Convention holding a number of positions such as Committee of Permanent Organization, Rules and Order of Business, representing Precinct 13. This committee identified the size of delegations to district, territory, and senatorial conventions as well as nominations for county offices. In 1892 Burleson was named as one of the 12 delegates to the District Convention in Roswell as well as one of 5 delegates to the 53rd U.S. Congress held in Santa Fe. In 1894 he served as the Democratic County Convention President.

For the election of 1898, Burleson was nominated as the Democratic Party candidate for the Lincoln County Sheriff. On 27 October 1898, The White Oaks Eagle reported that Burleson arrived from Lincoln to interview the voters of the precinct regarding his candidacy for Sheriff. The author noted “He need have no worry about No. 8 as a little Republican liquid enthusiasm cannot do the work here, that it does in other parts of the county.” The Board of Canvassers reported the results for the 1898 election. Burleson lost the election to Demetrio Perea by 48 votes: 588-540. The last reported political post he held was in 1919; Burleson at age 71, served as the Road Foreman for Precinct 1 in Lincoln.

Burleson's appointments as deputy sheriff in Colfax County has been previously noted. After moving to Lincoln County, he served several terms as a deputy to Sheriffs George Curry (1888–1890), Dan W. Roberts (1890–1892), Emzy (Emil) Fritz (1896–1897), James W. Owen (1902 and 1905) and Porfirio Chavez (1912–1913).

== Family life ==
Burleson was married to Mary Eunicia Chittenden (1862–1938) who was born in Maryville, Nodaway County, Missouri. In April 1865, she traveled with her parents from Missouri via wagon train led by Wagon Master Tom Boggs, settling in the Cimarron Valley. He and Mary had two children while residing in Colfax County: James O. (1879–1909) and Clara (1882–1885). Mae Mary was born in Socorro County (1886–1956) and sons Frederick "Fred" (1893–1979) and Thomas J. (1897–1977) were born in Lincoln County.

== In popular culture ==
Burleson's exploits were often carried in the press. His gunfight with Palo Blanco Cattle Company Manager Tom Driscoll was sensationalized by local, regional and international newspapers. Local newspapers such as the Las Vegas Daily Gazette and the Santa Fe New Mexican carried the gunfight as current news. Some five years later, Burleson's killing of Tom Driscoll became a national sensation. On 13 May 1889, the “wild west", was showcased, including a feature on Burleson, in a newspaper article entitled, “Life Among the Killers. Some of the Charms of Existence in New Mexico. Blood Curdling Reminiscences of a Cattleman from New Mexico. The Bloody, Wild West.” The article was first run by the Kansas City Times but carried nationwide in the ensuing months. Burleson's April 1878 gunfight with the four Texas cowboys in Cimarron was reported in the Trinidad News, Denver Tribune, and the Dodge City Times.

Burleson's notoriety with a gun was well earned and documented. Though friends with shootist Clay Allison, who had killed upwards of 22 men, his friendship and respect from Clay Allison was earned. The Daily Inter Mountain of Butte, Montana reported:

During the year that Allison was on the warpath in New Mexico, his doings occupied a good deal of public attention. But while his name was one to conjure by, and his courage was never questioned, there were men in New Mexico, but little heard of who were as brave and as quick on the trigger as he, and who would go no great lengths to avoid trouble with him. Burleson, the sheriff of Colfax County, was one of these.

Burleson became friends and neighbor with Eugene Manlove "Gene" Rhodes when both were living in southern New Mexico. Gene Rhodes admired men, like Burleson, that he classified as a "Trouble Man." “So, we mostly size up a fella by his abilities as a trouble man. Any kind of trouble—not necessarily the fightin’ kind. If he goes the route, if he sets no limit, if he’s enlisted for the war—well you naturally depend on him”. Gene Rhodes included a character named Pete Burleson in his 1909 Saturday Evening Post short story Trouble Man based on the real Pete Burleson. Rhodes and his wife both affectionately referred to Burleson as "Uncle Pete."

Burleson was acquainted with writer Emerson Hough from their time in White Oaks, New Mexico, where he was a lawyer and newspaper writer, and Burleson was a deputy sheriff. As with Rhodes, Hough found qualities he respected in Burleson and included a character based on Pete Burleson in his 1905 book, The Valley of Heart's Desire. Hough also credited Burleson with providing historical background to his 1926 novel Covered Wagon. Hough traveled back to New Mexico in hopes to get "Pete Burleson to loosen up and disclose his actual knowledge of the happenings in Colfax County and other parts of the state in the 70's and 80's." But Burleson "went to his grave with his lips sealed."
