= UU Bar Ranch =

The UU Bar Ranch "America’s Greatest Ranch", established in 1848 by Lucien B. Maxwell and once owned by the Oklahoma oil magnate Waite Phillips, is owned by Z&T Cattle Company (Zane and Tanya Kiehne) headquartered in Pecos, Texas. The Land Report lists Z&T Cattle Company as the nation's 24th largest landowner in 2025 owning almost one half million acres, including more than 30,000 acres located within Loving County, Texas’ oil rich Delaware Basin. The UU Bar Ranch abuts Cimarron, New Mexico, USA. The UU Bar Ranch is located on the south, the east, and the north side of Philmont Scout Ranch. The UU Bar Ranch and the Philmont Scout Ranch were both part of the 1,714,765 acre Maxwell Spanish Land Grant. The UU Bar Ranch’s headquarters, located on Rayado Creek, was part of Lucien B. Maxwell's ranch headquarters and is adjacent to Maxwell's original home. Cattle have grazed the UU Bar Ranch’s land continuously since 1848. When Waite Phillips purchased the UU Bar Ranch in the 1920s it totaled over 300,000 acres. Waite Phillips wanted to brand his cattle with a W Bar brand. However, New Mexico brand laws do not permit duplicate brands and the W Bar brand was already taken. Since Double U sounds like W, Phillips registered the UU Bar as his brand and changed the name of the ranch from Rayado Ranch to Double U Bar Ranch. Later in 1941, Phillips donated approximately 127,000 acres of his UU Bar Ranch to the Boy Scouts of America and retained the very best grazing, hunting and fishing land, the core land of today’s UU Bar Ranch. Without the use of the Villa Philmonte, Phillips briefly moved the UU Bar Ranch headquarters to the historic Casa del Gavilan near the base of Urraca Mesa, selling the ranch in 1943 to McDaniel Brothers.

The UU Bar Ranch’s cattle and (hunting and fishing) operations are managed by Z&T Cattle Company. Since purchasing the UU Bar Ranch in 2018, Z&T Cattle Company has purchased adjacent land and increased the UU Bar Ranch's size to approximately the size it was prior to the Boy Scout donations. The UU Bar Ranch currently contains 282,000 acres of land.
