= Ute Park Fire =

Wildfire in New Mexico, United States

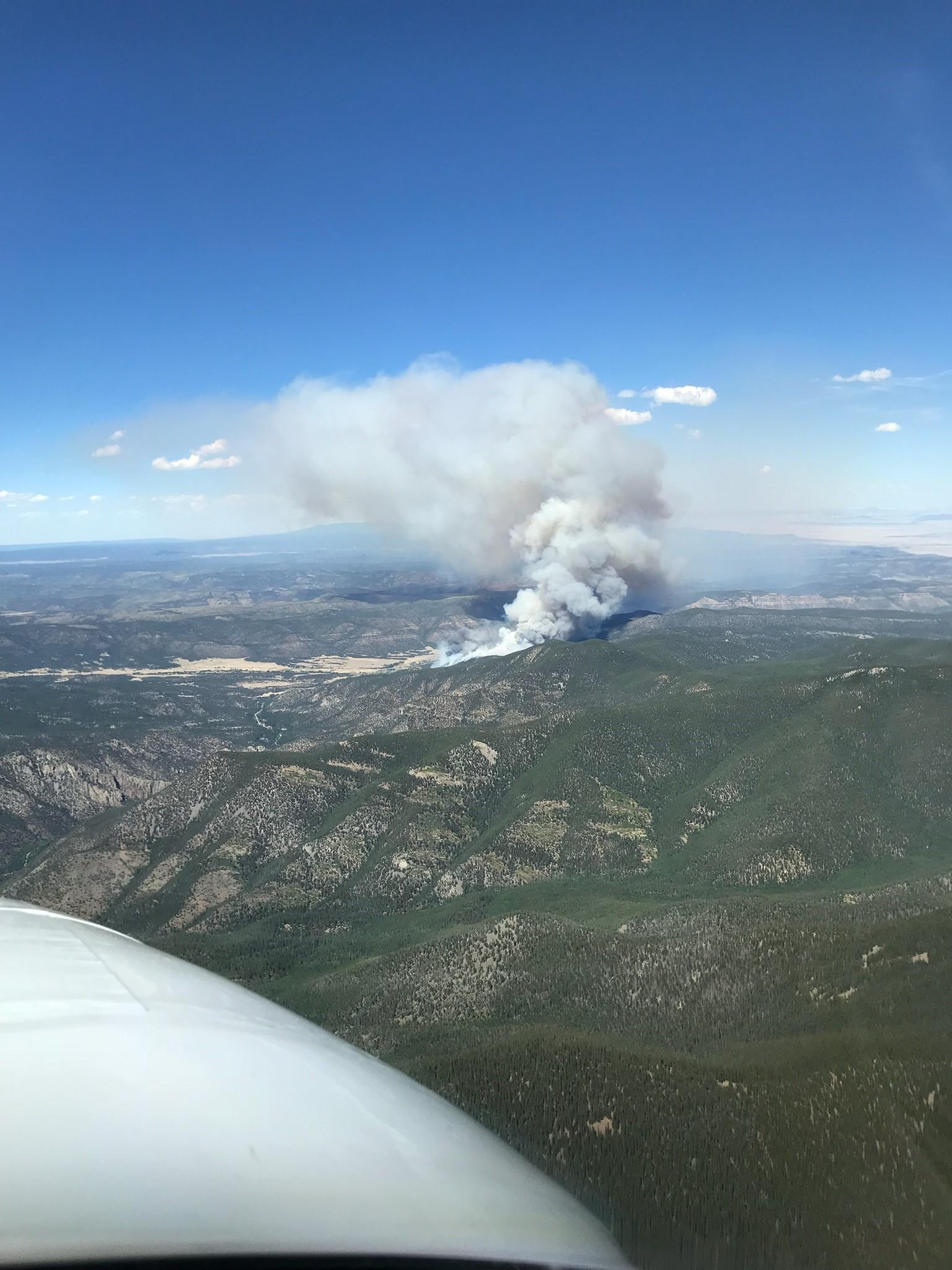
- Ute Park Fire on May 31, 2018
- Date: May 31, 2018 – June 19, 2018
- Location: Ute Park, New Mexico, United States
- Coordinates: 36.551°N 105.056°W

Statistics
- Burned area: 36,740 acres (149 km^{2})

Impacts
- Structures lost: 14

Ignition
- Cause: Under investigation

Map
- Location of fire in New Mexico.

The Ute Park Fire was a wildfire one mile east of Ute Park, New Mexico in the United States. The fire started on May 31, 2018. The cause remains under investigation. The fire burned a total of 36,740 acres (149 km^{2}) and was contained on June 19, 2018. It threatened the communities of Cimarron and Ute Park, with mandatory evacuations in place starting June 1st and 2nd, respectively, until June 8th when both were lifted. The fire destroyed 14 buildings and threatened over 750 structures.

== Incidents ==
=== May ===
The Ute Park Fire was first reported after 2 p.m. on 31 May 2018. It was reported burning between Eagle Nest Lake and Cimarron in Colfax County, New Mexico, just off Highway 64 in Ute Park. Fire officials reported the fire being fueled by grass and piñon. By that evening, the fire had grown from 150 acres (1 km^{2}) to 4,500 acres (18 km^{2}), threatening 150 structures. Evacuation orders were put in place for the community of Hummingbird Lane and surrounding areas. The fire jumped Highway 64, causing the area of the highway between Eagle Nest Lake and Cimarron to be closed.

=== June ===
By the morning of June 1st, the Ute Park Fire had almost doubled in size to 8,000 acres (32 km^{2}), burning entirely on private land, including Philmont Scout Ranch. Twelve structures at Philmont, all unoccupied and non-residential, were reported as burned. Voluntary evacuations were put in place for Cimarron. New Mexico State Parks closed Eagle Nest Lake for helicopters to access water to fight the fire. By the evening, the fire had grown to 16,354 acres (66 km^{2}), burned two more non-residential buildings, and threatened a total of 296 structures. Cimarron was given mandatory evacuation orders.

The situation remained dynamic into the morning of June 2nd, as the fire had grown to an estimated 27,290 acres (110 km^{2}) due to wind. Fire crews focused on structure protection in Cimarron by implementing strategic burnouts. The community of Ute Park was put under mandatory evacuation and numerous highways and routes were closed.

It rained in the area on June 3rd, stunting fire activity. Firefighters focused on mopping up hotspots and suppressing spot fires. By the evening of June 5, the Ute Park Fire had burned a total of 36,800 acres (149 km^{2}), with 604 personnel fighting the fire, including by air, and was at 30 percent containment. The evacuation order for Cimarron was lifted, though the areas of Ute Park, Philmont Scout Ranch, Cimarroncito and Urraca Watersheds, Cimarron Canyon State Park and private lands were still under threat. Eagle Nest Lake State Park was re-opened to boating and Cimarron State Park remained closed through July 8th.

The Ute Park Fire was declared 100 percent contained on June 19th. It burned a total of 36,740 acres (149 km^{2}).

== Closures ==
Cimarron Canyon State Park remained closed until 8 July 2018. All backcountry treks at Philmont Scout Ranch were cancelled for the 2018 season, for the first time since the original donation of the ranch to the BSA in 1938. Backcountry treks were run in both the North and South country in 2019 but the burn zone remained unstable and dangerous. In 2024 and 2025, the burn zone would reopen to crews.
