= Dustin Burleson =

American orthodontist and consultant

- Born: July 1979 (age 47); Wheelersburg, Ohio
- Education: University of Missouri-Kansas City
- Occupation: Orthodontist
- Website: www.burlesonorthodontics.com

Dustin Burleson is an American orthodontist and consultant.

== Career ==
Burleson started Burleson Orthodontics and Pediactric Dentistry (BOPD) in 2006. He also runs a private consulting and coaching company, Burleson Seminars. As an Assistant Clinical Professor, he teaches at his alma mater, UMKC, and at The Children's Mercy Hospital.

Burleson uses his specialty training to help patients with cleft palate at Saint Luke's Hospital. Dr. Burleson is the Director of The Leo H. Rheam Foundation for Cleft and Craniofacial Orthodontics. He also supports Smiles Change Lives and is the nation’s largest provider of free orthodontic care through this community orthodontic program. Burleson is a Founding Fellow of the Institute of Coaching at McLean Hospital, an affiliate of Harvard Medical School.

In January 2022, Rock Dental Brands acquired Burleson Orthodontics and Pediatric Dentistry locations in Kansas City and Raymore, Missouri.

== Awards ==
- Golden Apple Award for New Dental Leadership from the American Dental Association (2014)
- Distinguished Service Award from Smiles Change Lives (2014)
- Top Dentist by 435 South magazine (2013-2016)
- Family Favorite by KC Parent magazine (2013-2014, 2018)
- "Best of the Northland" Silver Award (Orthodontics) (2012)
- The Talk Award (Patient Satisfaction) (2013-2019)

== Publications ==
Dr. Burleson is the author of The Ultimate Ortho Handbook, The Consumer's Guide to Invisalign, Stop Hiding Your Smile! A Parent's Guide to Confidently Choosing an Orthodontist, The Ortho Manifesto, and The Truth About Referrals from Patients and Dentists, along with D50 Must-Read Business Books to Grow Your Orthodontic Practice, Don't Ask Them to Hide Their Smile, Own It, and Smiles Change Lives.

He is also a contributing author of No B.S. Guide to Maximum Referrals and Customer Retention and has been published in the Journal of the American Dental Association, Monthly Journal of Spectacular Smiles, Orthodontic Practice, and Orthotown, along with being featured on various podcasts including the Elevate Orthodontics Podcast, Dentistry Uncensored, and his own, The Burleson Box.

== Background ==
A graduate of Wheelersburg High School in Wheelersburg, Ohio, Burleson spent his early teenage years working in his father’s dental office, an experience that led him to pursue his own career in the dental field. At the University of Missouri-Kansas City, he studied Biology and earned both his Bachelor of Arts and D.D.S degrees. Though a unique six-year program, he was able to complete all of his specialty training in Orthodontics and Dentofacial Orthopedics at UMKC as well. He holds a Master of Business Administration from New Charter University.

He resides in Kansas City, Missouri with his family.
