= Ute Park, New Mexico =

- Unincorporated community Census-designated place
- Location within the state of New Mexico
- Coordinates: 36°32′48″N 105°06′14″W
- Country: United States
- State: New Mexico
- County: Colfax

Area
  - Total: 3.39 sq mi (8.79 km^{2})
  - Land: 3.39 sq mi (8.79 km^{2})
  - Water: 0 sq mi (0.00 km^{2})
- Elevation: 7,710 ft (2,350 m)

Population (2020)
  - Total: 63
  - Density: 18.5/sq mi (7.16/km^{2})
- Time zone: UTC-7 (Mountain (MST))
  - Summer (DST): UTC-6 (MDT)
- ZIP code: 87749
- FIPS code: 35-81450
- GNIS feature ID: 2629128

Ute Park is an unincorporated community and census-designated place in Colfax County, New Mexico, United States. As of the 2020 census, Ute Park had a population of 63. It was formerly part of the Maxwell Land Grant.

Ute Park lies on U.S. Route 64 between Cimarron and Eagle Nest, just east of Cimarron Canyon State Park.

In 1921, the Guide to New Mexico described it as:

Ute Park was named for the Ute Indians, who lived on the east slope of near-by Mt. Baldy. The rebellious Ute resisted their white oppressors, and an Indian Agency and military force were maintained at Cimarron to keep them subdued, until they were finally moved to a reservation in southern Colorado and Utah. The village of Ute Park, opposite the mouth of Ute Creek, is the terminus of an A.T.&S.F. railway branch and is a distributing point for freight for the Moreno Valley, Red River and Taos.

The St. Louis, Rocky Mountain and Pacific Railway abandoned the Ute Park branch circa 1942. Portions of the right of way are still visible, but most railroad structures have been removed.

== Demographics ==
Historical population
Census	Pop.	Note	%±
2020	63		—
U.S. Decennial Census

== See also ==
- Ute Park Fire
