= Derick Burleson =

American academic and writer

Derick Wade Burleson (September 9, 1963 – December 29, 2016) was an American academic and writer. He was the author of Never Night (Marick Press, 2008). His first collection of poems, Ejo: Poems, Rwanda 1991–94, won the 2000 Felix Pollak Prize in Poetry. He was also the recipient of a 1999 National Endowment for the Arts Fellowship in Poetry. His poems have appeared in The Georgia Review, The Kenyon Review, The Paris Review, Poetry, and many other journals. He lived and taught English in Rwanda in the two years leading up to the genocide which took place in 1994. A recipient of a 1999 National Endowment for the Arts Fellowship in Poetry, Burleson taught creative writing and literature at the University of Alaska Fairbanks, and lived with his daughter in Two Rivers, Alaska, until his death.
