= Taos Mountain Trail =

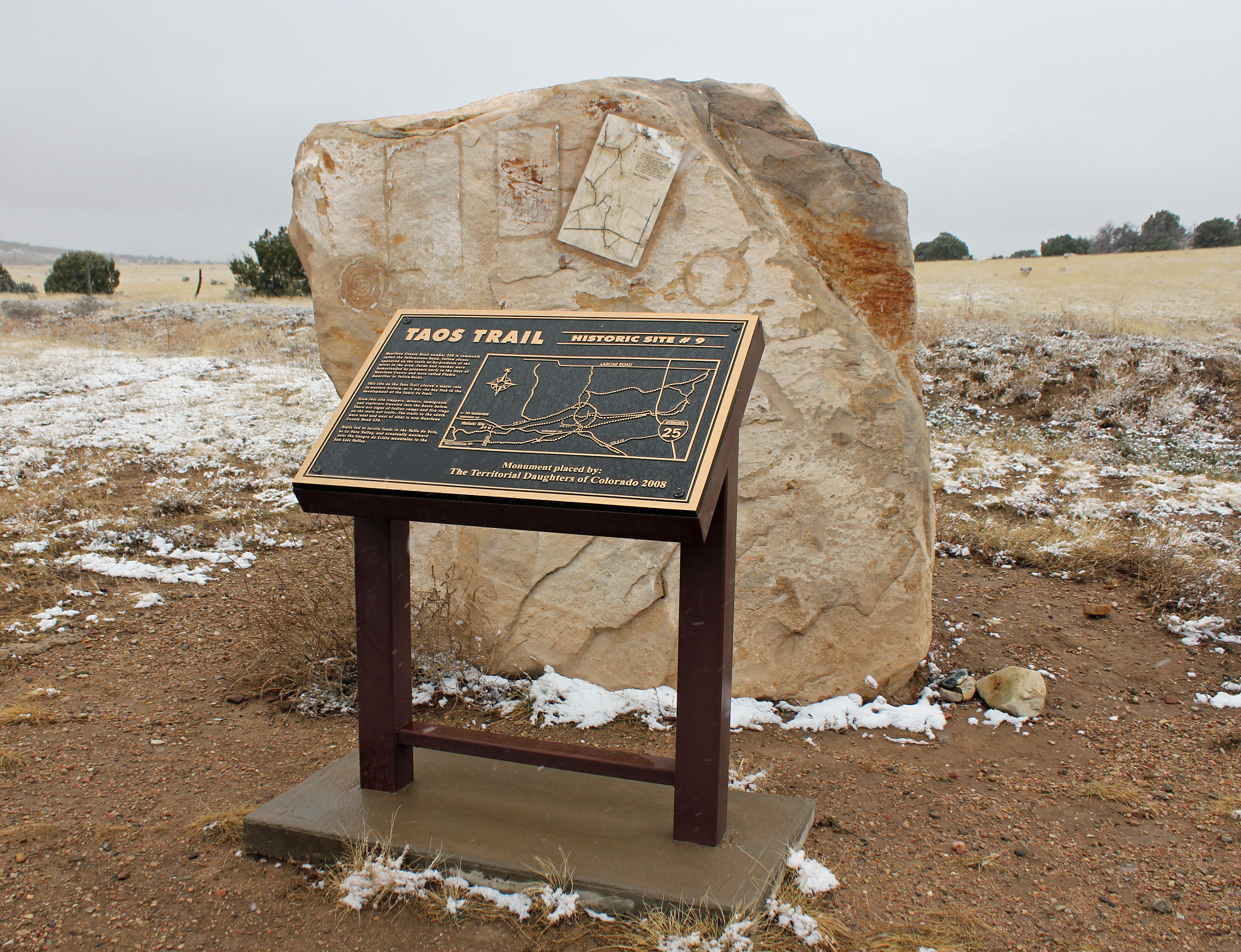
A historical marker memorializing the trail, located on County Road 520 in Huerfano County, Colorado.

The Taos Mountain Trail was the historic pathway for trade and business exchanges between agrarian Taos (New Mexico) and the Great Plains (Colorado) from pre-history (1100 A.D.) through the Spanish Colonial period and into the time of the European and American presence. The Taos Mountain Trail, between northern New Mexico and southern Colorado, connected the high mountain traders and their trading partners north and south of the Sangre de Cristo Mountains. Also called the Trapper's Trail, the pathway was only wide enough for people on foot or horses in single file, but it shortened a trip from Taos to the plains farther north from nearly two weeks to three days in good weather. The Taos Mountain Trail was also known as the Sangre de Cristo Trail and the Aztec Trail.

In the early period (1100 AD to 1500 AD), the trail connected the Pueblos of northern New Mexico to the Plains Indians—Ute, Arapaho, Apache, Cheyenne and Kiowa. The sedentary Pueblo people traded crops of corn, squash, melons, and beans to the migratory Plains tribes in exchange for buffalo meat, hides and other goods.

Legend has it that traders from far away Tenochtitlan, the Aztec capital (near modern Mexico City) used the trail leaving cairns of stones to mark the way. Although there is a great deal of evidence that the people of Mesoamerica traded North into present day Colorado (Mesa Verde), the only evidence for Tarahumaran penetration into Colorado was the discovery of plant of Mexican origin at the top of the pass by William A. Weber, professor emeritus of Botany. Charlie Charlefue, a Huerfano Valley resident, also placed a group of Tarahumara Indians in the area prior to American contact

Taos Pueblo was a trading center hosting fall and spring trade fairs. This fair is mentioned as being in existence prior to and throughout the Spanish Colonial period. In good weather, the Taos Mountain Trail provided the pathway for travel from the eastern plains to the wide plateaus of the Taos Pueblo.

Trading companies (desiring furs and hides) determined that sending out men to trade with the Native American groups for the desired hides was more efficient than building trading posts and inviting the Native American people to visit. The traders would obtain their goods from stores in Taos or Santa Fe then return to sell the hides obtained in trade with the Native American thus making the Taos Mountain Trail conduit more important. To aid the trade, Bent's Fort was built in 1833 and El Pueblo Trading Post followed in 1842. Traders headquartered in Bent's Fort and El Pueblo went out to trade with goods from Taos. The Taos Mountain Trail continued in use as it provided quick access to a settled community.

During the Mexican–American War, the people of Taos (Taoseños), both Native American and Spanish, revolted in January 1847 killing many Americans living in Taos including the American appointed governor Charles Bent. Survivors of the attack at nearby Turley's Mill crossed the Taos Mountain Trail on foot in winter to spread the word of the revolt to El Pueblo Trading Post and Bent's Fort.

During the railroad expansion era (1848–1853), the Taos Mountain Trail, also called the Sangre de Cristo Pass, was considered for a railway route. E.G. Beckwith was sent to survey the area in 1853. Richard Kern, a topographer and expeditionary artist, traveled with Beckwith to illustrate the land for the report. Although the trail was not chosen for the railroad as it was too steep, the report did provide documentation of the Taos Mountain Trail.

== Bibliography ==
- Garrard, Lewis H. (1968). Wah-to-yah & the Taos Trail. Palo Alto, CA: American West Publishing Comp.
- Hammond, G. P. (Ed.). (1976). The Adventures of Alexander Barclay. Mountain Man. Denver.
- Lecompte, Janet. (1978). Pueblo, Hardscrabble, Greenhorn: Society on the High Plains, 1832–1856. Norman, OK: University of Oklahoma Press.
- Martinez Martinez, Deborah & Pacheco, Robert W. (illustrator). (2010). Trade on the Taos Mountain Trail. Pueblo, CO: Vanishing Horizons.
