= Burleson LLP =

American law firm in Houston, New Orleans

Burleson LLP was an American law firm with offices in Denver, Houston, New Orleans, Pittsburgh and San Antonio. It closed its doors in December 2015.

Burleson LLP was a full-service corporate law firm that served clients in a diverse range of industries. They were known for their expertise in energy and has a presence in every major North American oil and gas region. They also represented companies in matters that include litigation, mergers and acquisitions, tax, regulatory, real estate, bankruptcy and restructuring, finance, insurance, and employment and labor. Many of the firm's attorneys have worked in the energy industry, including backgrounds as corporate general counsel, petroleum engineers, landmen, and geologists, which enabled the firm to bring extensive understanding, knowledge, and insight to the companies and individuals it serves.

Burleson LLP was founded in April 2005. At its peak, approximately 105 attorneys worked for Burleson LLP. They had 5 offices in 4 different states: Texas, Louisiana, Colorado, and Pennsylvania. The attorneys of Burleson LLP were licensed to practice in over 20 states, collectively. 4 attorneys in Burleson LLP's Texas offices were Board Certified in Oil, Gas & Mineral Law by the Texas Board of Legal Specialization.

Burleson LLP handled legal matters for clients in the major U.S. shale plays, including the Barnett, Bakken, Eagle Ford, Fayetteville, Haynesville, Marcellus, Mississippi Lime, Niobrara, Permian Basin, Utica and Woodford shale formations.

== History ==
- 2005 - Burleson LLP was founded under the name Burleson Cooke by Richard L. Burleson and Dr. Claude E. Cooke in Houston, Texas with a few senior-level attorneys.
- 2009 - Burleson LLP opened an office in Canonsburg, Pennsylvania (Pittsburgh-area)
- 2010 - The San Antonio, Texas office of Burleson LLP is founded
- 2011 - Burleson LLP opened the Denver, Colorado office; Dr. Claude E. Cooke retires and the firm changes its name to Burleson LLP
- 2012 - Burleson LLP opens an office in Midland, Texas
- 2014 - Burleson LLP opens an office in New Orleans, Louisiana to further serve its diverse client base which ranges from small offshore service companies to self-insured companies to multinational corporations operating in the Gulf of Mexico.
- 2015 - Burleson LLP announces that it would close at the end of 2015.

== Recognition ==
2014

- 2 Texas attorneys named as Texas SuperLawyers

2013

- 7 attorneys selected as "Who's Who in Energy," The American City Business Journals, 2013
- Ranked #342 on the NLJ 350 list
- Named Rocky Mountain Law Firm of the Year
- Number 1 Largest Energy Law Firm in San Antonio, 2013
- Named to National Law Journal "Midsize Hot List"

2012

- Ranked #345 on the NLJ 350 list
- Number 1 Largest Energy Law Firm in San Antonio, 2012
- Ranked among Largest Energy Law Practices in Pittsburgh, 2012
- Ranked in Houston Fast 100, 2012
- 7 attorneys selected as "Who's Who in Energy," 2012
- 2 Attorneys named as Texas SuperLawyers
- 2 Attorneys named as Pennsylvania Rising Stars

2011

- Ranked in Houston Fast 100, 2011
- Ranked as a 2011 Top Workplace in Houston
- 4 attorneys selected as "Who's Who in Energy," 2011
