= Davis Burleson =

American social media personality

- Born: Houston, Texas
- Occupations: Host, Radio & Content Creator
- Years active: 2020–present

Davis Burleson is an American host and social media personality based in New York City. He is the host of Fallen Media's popular Man on the Street series, "What’s Poppin'? With Davis!" and appears on SiriusXM Hits 1 radio.

Davis interviews and covers fashion, pop culture, and major events. Davis curates and presents the latest trends in music and culture on SiriusXM's Hits 1.

== Early life ==
In March 2020, Burleson began posting on TikTok. He gained 100,000 followers by the fall of 2020 when he moved to New York City to study photography at the Eugene Lang College of Liberal Arts at The New School.

== Career ==
Davis is a host on SiriusXM's Hits 1 Radio. On the platform, he has interviewed celebrities such as Dua Lipa, Niall Horan and Olivia Rodrigo on their careers and the broader world of pop culture.

Burleson partnered with Fallen Media, a New York based short-form content studio to lead the production of "What’s Poppin? With Davis!" The series features Burleson interviewing visitors of Washington Square Park.

In Spring 2022, Burleson was hired by Ganni during Copenhagen Fashion Week to post content on Instagram and TikTok. He hosted a backstage stream on TikTok at the 64th Annual Grammy Awards. By September 2022, Burleson's show had 2.1 million TikTok followers. In June 2023, he was the face of UGG's pride month campaign. Burleson was interviewed by UGG about being gay and the It Gets Better Project.
