= Carl Burleson =

American politician

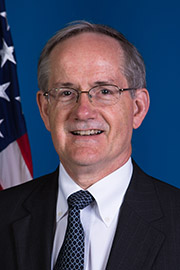

Deputy Administrator of the Federal Aviation Administration
- Incumbent
- Assumed office January 7, 2018
- Preceded by: Daniel Elwell

Carl E. Burleson is an American aviation administrator who is the Acting Federal Aviation Administration (FAA) Deputy Administrator. Burleson assumed this post on January 7, 2018.

Burleson received a BA in Government and Communications from University of Virginia. an MA in economics from Boston University, and an MA in International Development from American University.

In 1989, Burleson joined the FAA as a Regulatory Economist/Loan Guarantee Specialist in the Office of Policy and Plans. In 1991, he became an International Aviation Specialist of International Aviation. In 1992, Burleson became the Manager of International Operations Branch in International Aviation. In 1994, he took the position of FAA Senior Representative for Northern Europe/United Kingdom of International Aviation in London. Burleson became the Chief of Staff for FAA Administrator in 1991 and the Director of Environment and Energy in 2001.

In 2001, Burleson was appointed the FAA's Deputy Assistant Administrator for Policy, International Affairs, and Environment . In this role, he led the agency's efforts to increase the safety and capacity of the global aerospace system in an environmentally sound manner. This included leading the FAA's strategic policy and planning efforts; coordinating the agency's reauthorization before Congress; overseeing the national and international aviation policies, strategies, and research efforts in the environment and energy arenas; managing the FAA's aviation activity forecasts, economic analyses, and regulatory evaluations; and, dealing with the aviation war risk insurance program.

Burleson was a finalist in the Public Service to America Awards in 2010 for his efforts in dealing with aviation environmental challenges. He is a recipient of the Office of Secretary's International Aviation and Safety Award.
