= Bob Burlison =

English footballer (1920–1987)

Personal information
- Full name: Robert Lyle Burlison
- Date of birth: 29 March 1920
- Place of birth: Newcastle upon Tyne, England
- Date of death: February 1987 (aged 66)
- Place of death: Barnet, England
- Position: Forward

Senior career*
Years	Team	Apps	(Gls)
1946–1947	Charlton Athletic	1	(0)
- * Club domestic league appearances and goals

Robert Lyle Burlison (29 March 1920 – February 1987) was an English footballer who played in the Football League for Charlton Athletic.
