= Cimarron Canyon State Park =

Wilderness recreation area in New Mexico, US

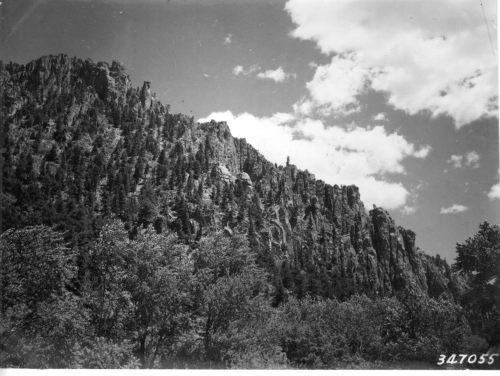
- The Palisades Sill in Cimarron Canyon

- Location within New Mexico
- Interactive map of Cimarron Canyon State Park
- Location: Colfax County, New Mexico, United States
- Coordinates: 36°31′55″N 105°09′53″W
- Area: 378 acres (153 ha)
- Elevation: 7,876 ft (2,401 m)
- Established: 1979
- Administrator: New Mexico Energy, Minerals and Natural Resources Department
- Website: Official website

Cimarron Canyon State Park is a state park of New Mexico, United States, located 3 miles (4.8 km) east of Eagle Nest in the Colin Neblett Wildlife Area. The park extends for 8 miles (13 km) along the Cimarron Canyon between Tolby Creek and Ute Park. The Palisades Sill forms spectacular cliffs above the Cimarron River here. The park is popular for trout fishing in the Cimarron River and its tributaries Clear Creek and Tolby Creek.

== Gallery ==
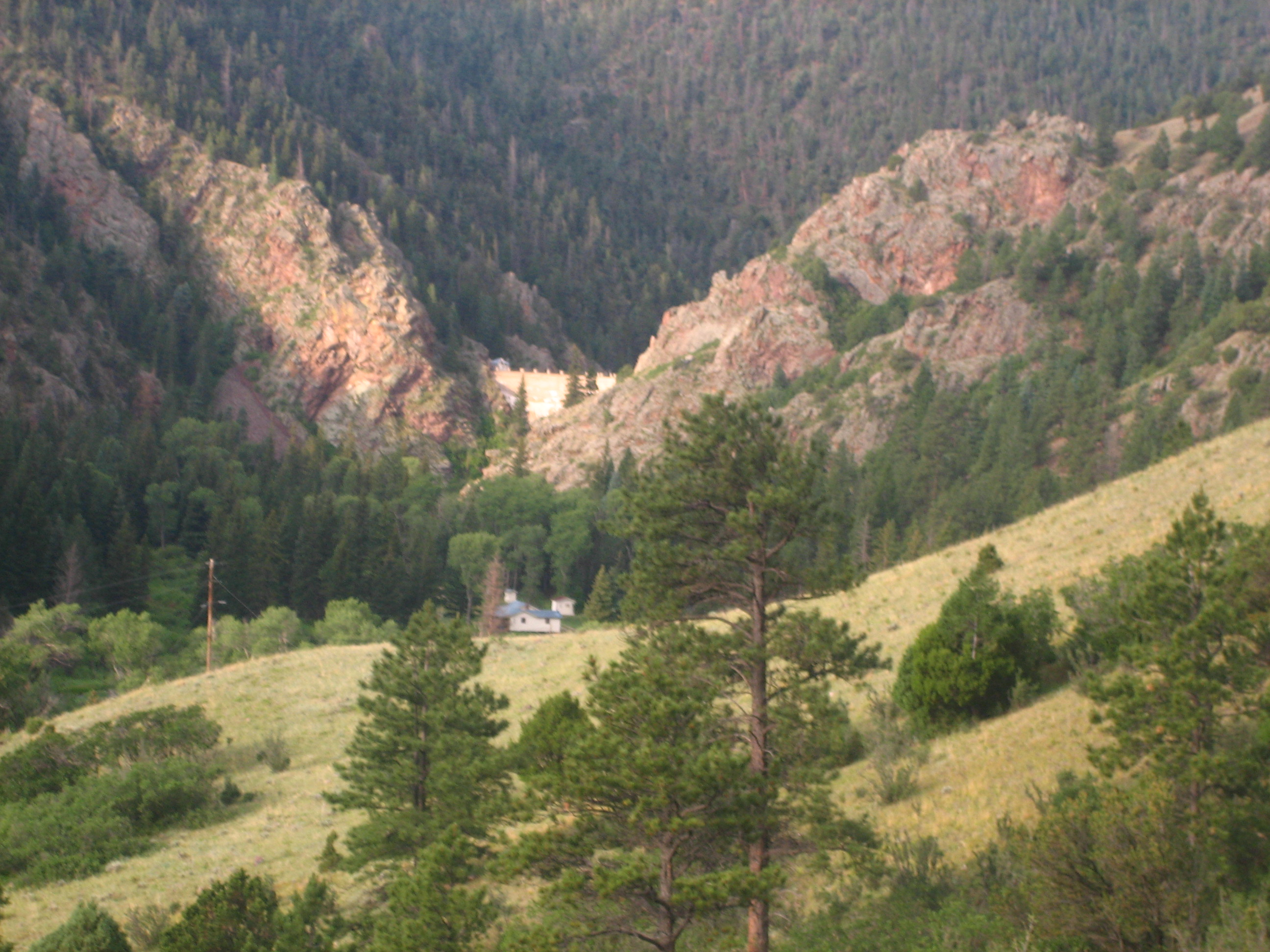
Cimarron Canyon State Park, just below the dam for Eagle Nest Lake.

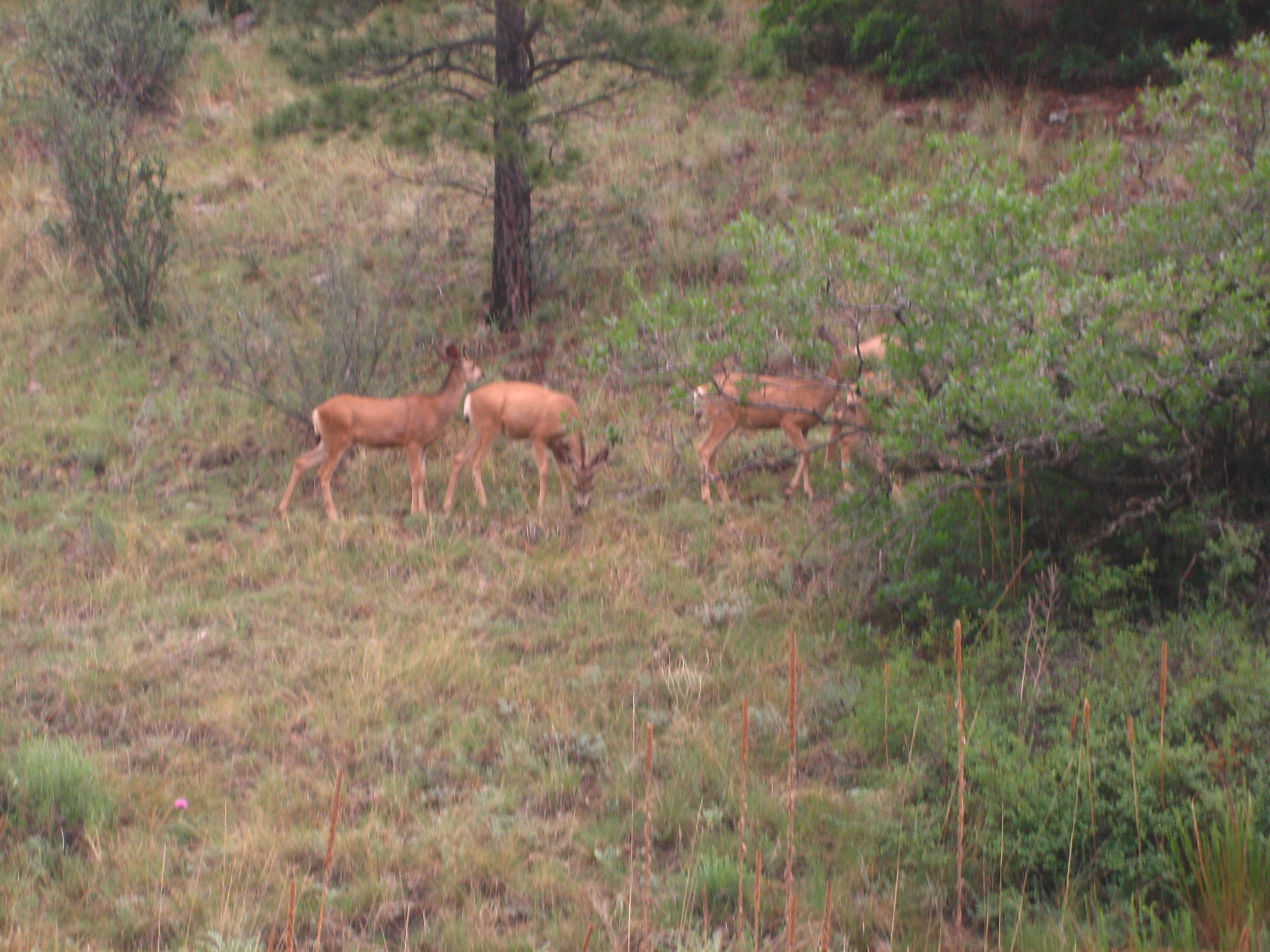
Deer at Cimarron Canyon State Park

== See also ==
- Cimarron, New Mexico
- Philmont Scout Ranch
