= Palo Flechado Pass =

Mountain pass in Taos County, New Mexico

Coordinates: 36°24′52.13″N 105°20′11.04″W

Palo Flechado Pass (Spanish: "tree pierced with arrows"), also called Taos Pass and Old Taos Pass, is a mountain pass located in Taos County, New Mexico, United States on the Enchanted Circle Scenic Byway.

== Geography ==
Palo Flechado Pass is 9,109 feet (2,776 m) in altitude. It is located 3.5 miles west of Aqua Fria Creek on U.S. Route 64 in the Carson National Forest. A tributary of Agua Fria Creek, Palo Flechado Creek, is near the pass.

== History ==
Comanche, Kiowa, and Apache used the mountain pass on a trail from the plains to and then alongside the Cimarron River (also called La Flecha) before the arrival of the Spanish. It continued to be used by Native Americans, Spaniards, and Europeans on journeys to Taos.

According to the historic marker placed at the pass, a band of Apaches, the Flecha de Palo, lived in the plains east of the mountains in 1706. A common theory for the name of the pass is based upon a Taos Pueblo tradition for shooting arrows into a tree at a mountain pass following a successful buffalo hunt.

== Recreation ==
There are two hiking trails within a mile of the pass that go into the Palo Flechado Meadow and alongside a stream. The Elliot Barker Trail leads to a pond and then a dense spruce-fir forest. The La Jara Trail at Forest Road 5 parallels a stream in the Rio Grande valley.
