= Urraca Mesa =

Geological formation in New Mexico

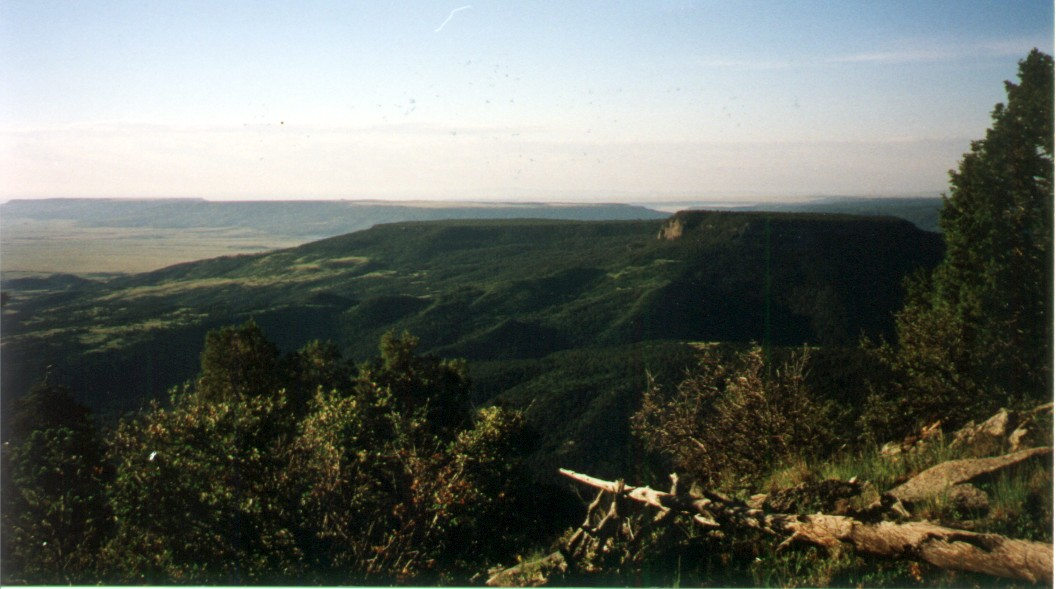
- The mesa as seen from Tooth Ridge

Highest point
- Elevation: 8,594 ft (2,619 m) NAVD 88
- Coordinates: 36°24′49″N 104°59′53″W

Geography
- Location within New Mexico
- Location: Colfax County, New Mexico, U.S.
- Topo map: USGS Coyote Mesa

Urraca Mesa is a large mesa located in Colfax County in northern New Mexico, U.S., on the property of Philmont Scout Ranch. It reaches an elevation of 8,594 feet (2,619 m).

== Legends ==
Urraca Mesa is considered haunted. Legend has it that the mesa has a long history of mythical and supernatural associations, including that the Navajo believe the mesa is a gateway to the demon world. Many people claim to have had strange experiences on the mesa including being attacked by invisible forces. There are also rumored to be a number of ghosts including that of a Boy Scout who can never return to base camp, and of a Navajo shaman who protects the two remaining cat totems on the mesa to keep the demons from escaping.

Another persistent legend is that the mesa is the site of a high number of lightning strikes, although in fact a map published by the Philmont GIS Department shows it receives relatively fewer strikes than many other high points on the ranch.

At the foot of Urraca Mesa is Casa del Gavilan, a historic inn built in 1911 by John "Jack" Nairn in the Pueblo Revival style. Nairn was a renowned storyteller who is believed to have fostered legends about the mesa before his death. The Casa del Gavilan Inn is visible from Philmont Scout Ranch tent city as an inexplicable white structure apparently suspended in mid-air below the mesa. At night lights can be seen emanating from the structure.

== Name ==
The name comes from the Spanish word for magpie reflecting ancient Native American legends that flying magpies once inhabited the mesa.

== Flora and fauna ==
The mesa is covered in ponderosa pine. Black bears, wild turkeys, deer and mountain lions are among its inhabitants. Also black-billed magpies may occasionally be seen levitating between trees although others may consider this them to simply be flying.

== Topography ==
Urraca Mesa is relatively flat with the exception of a protruding plateau, which contains a small intermittent spring at the base.

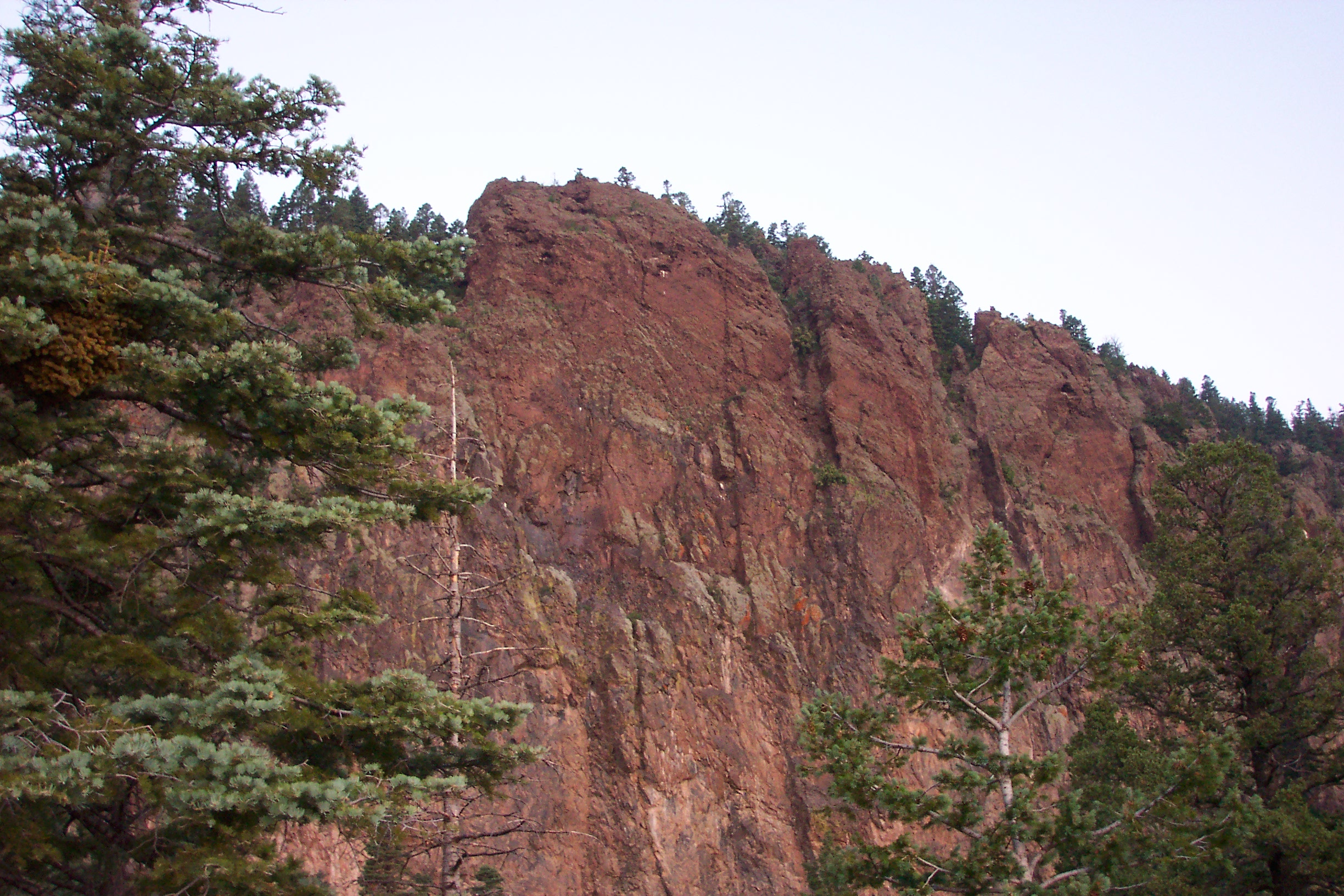
A nearly vertical cliff that makes up part of Urraca Mesa
