= Cimarron, New Mexico =

- Village
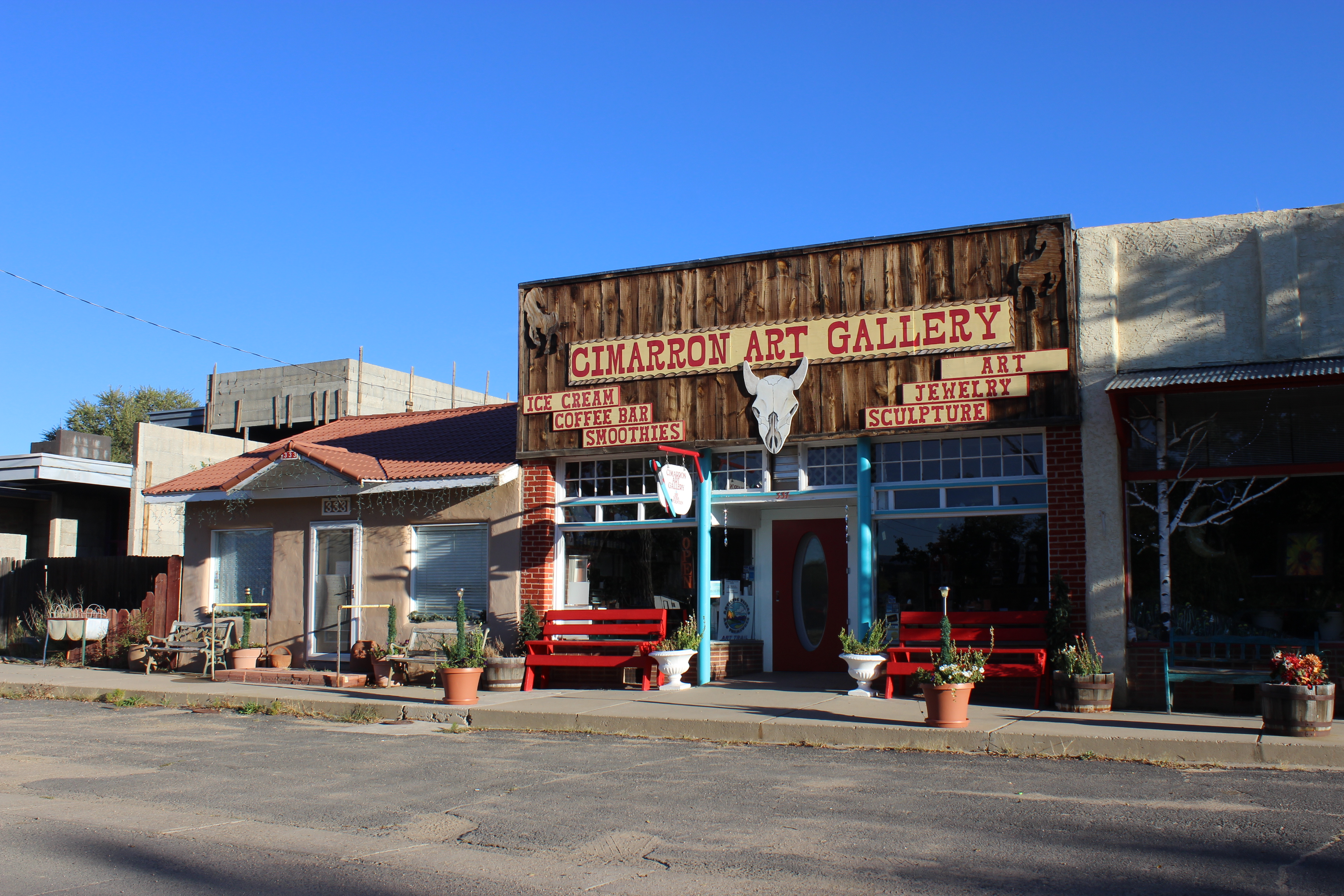
- Downtown Cimarron

- Location of Cimarron, New Mexico

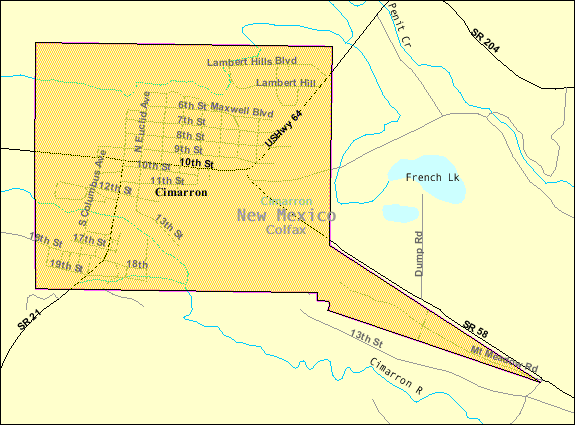
- U.S. Census map

- Location in the United States
- Coordinates: 36°30′14″N 104°53′56″W
- Country: United States
- State: New Mexico
- County: Colfax

Area
  - Total: 2.12 sq mi (5.48 km^{2})
  - Land: 2.12 sq mi (5.48 km^{2})
  - Water: 0 sq mi (0.00 km^{2})
- Elevation: 6,421 ft (1,957 m)

Population (2020)
  - Total: 792
  - Density: 374.0/sq mi (144.42/km^{2})
- Time zone: UTC-7 (Mountain (MST))
  - Summer (DST): UTC-6 (MDT)
- ZIP code: 87714
- Area code: 575
- FIPS code: 35-15440
- GNIS feature ID: 2413540
- Website: villageofcimarron.net

Cimarron is a village in Colfax County, New Mexico, United States, which sits on the eastern slopes of the Sangre de Cristo Mountains. The population was 792 at the 2020 census, making it the fourth most populous municipality in Colfax County.

Cimarron sits on the Cimarron River, a tributary of the 900 mile-long Canadian River, whose headwaters are at the Eagle Nest Dam, with the main part of town lying along U.S. Route 64. The village is surrounded on all sides by numerous ranches, including Philmont Scout Ranch, an extensive "high-adventure base" operated by Scouting America. Philmont is located just four miles (6.4 km) south of Cimarron. Other ranches also include the Chase Ranch (famous for its heart-shaped brand and allegedly the Marlboro Man's place of origin), Ted Turner's Vermejo Reserve, the CS Ranch, the Express UU Bar Ranch (formerly the property of Waite Phillips), and the Clearview Ranch of the western singer/songwriter R. W. Hampton, as well as numerous other small ranches. The Elliott Barker State Wildlife Area, the Valle Vidal unit of the Carson National Forest, and Cimarron Canyon State Park, are also located within the Cimarron area. 17 miles and 28 miles to the northeast is Dawson, New Mexico, a ghost town with a population of over 9,000 near the early 20th century, and the Raton Municipal Airport, respectively.

The village is a pioneer of the four-day school week (Monday–Thursday), which it originally implemented in the early 1970s, during a time of rising fuel and utility prices. Cimarron is home to the 1979 New Mexico High School Boys Basketball State Championship team.

== History ==
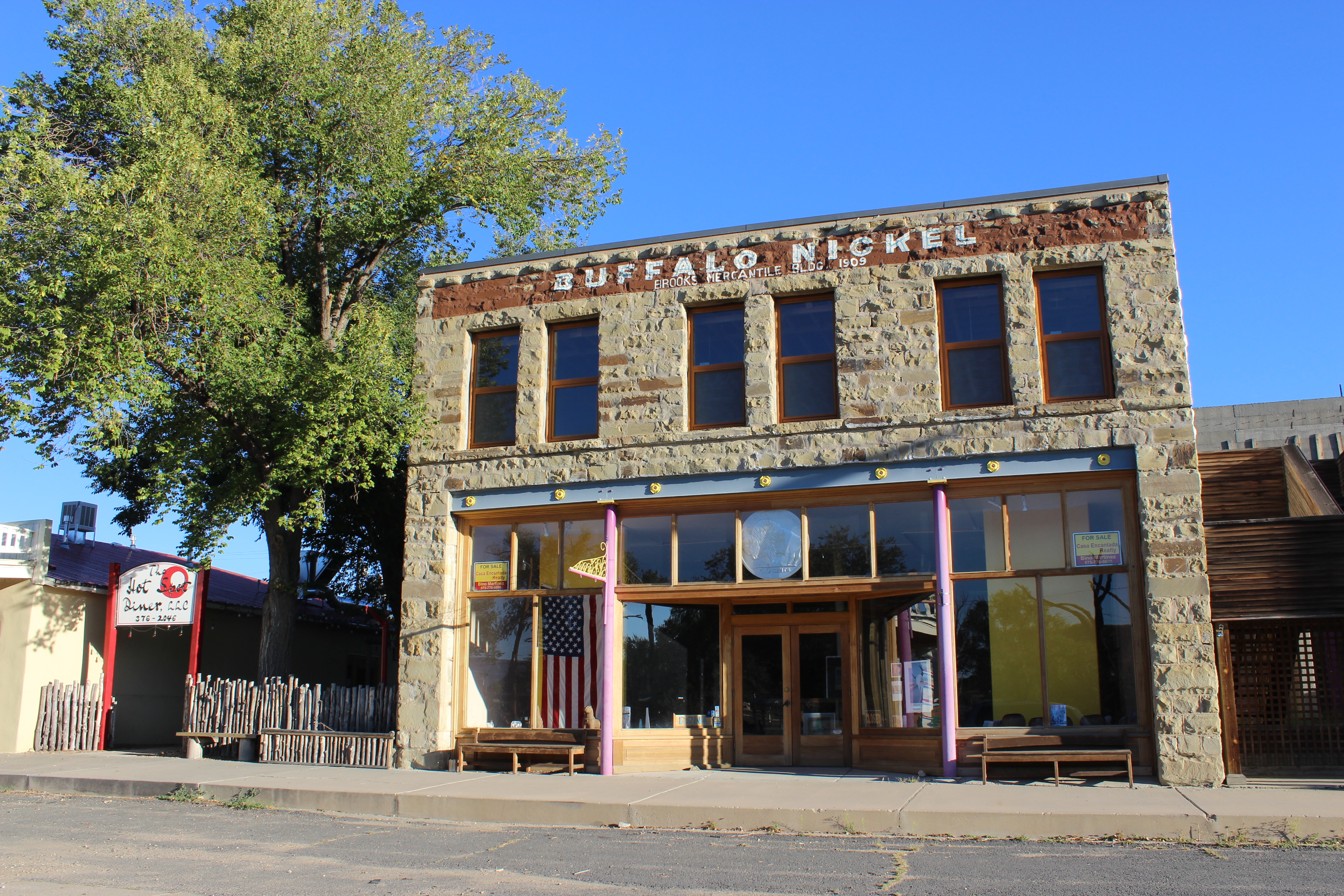
Brooks Mercantile Building, c. 1909.

Cimarron is located on the land of what became known as the 1,700,000 acres (6,900 km^{2}) Maxwell Land Grant. In 1842, Lucien B. Maxwell, a fur trapper, came to the Beaubien-Miranda Ranch in northern New Mexico and courted and married Luz Beaubien, one of the owner's six daughters. He eventually inherited the ranch and built a mansion in 1858 on the future town site.

Maxwell built the Aztec Mill in 1864. It is preserved as the Old Mill Museum, operated by the Cimarron Historical Society. The museum's collection includes working mill parts; Native American tools, weapons and pottery; Maxwell Land Grant paperwork and documents; and other materials.

Cimarron was officially chartered in 1859 and was named for the Spanish word used to describe a mustang, meaning "wild" or "unbroken". Cimarron was the county seat of Colfax County beginning in 1872, when it replaced Elizabethtown. At that time, Cimarron was a stage stop on the Mountain Branch of the Santa Fe Trail. In 1881, the county seat was moved to Springer, a town on the Atchison, Topeka and Santa Fe Railway. It was during this time that Lucien Maxwell, due to rising tensions, sold the Maxwell Land Grant to a group of investors, with the resultant Colfax County War in which more than two hundred people were killed.

In 1905, the St. Louis, Rocky Mountain and Pacific Railway laid tracks from Raton to Ute Park, with the intent to haul coal between Raton and Cimarron. Passengers used the daily train service, as well as ranchers who moved agricultural animals. During World War II, the tracks were removed, with the steel to be recycled to help with the shortage during the war effort.

Soon after the tracks were laid through town, tracks were also laid 22 miles up Ponil Canyon by the Cimarron and Northwestern Railway Company, to haul timber from the surrounding mountains, which were loaded with douglas fir and ponderosa pine. The railroad company delivered its timber to the Continental Tie and Lumber Company, located in Cimarron, NM, who made railroad ties and timber supports for nearby coal mines.

On June 25, 1960 a strong F0 tornado hit the town injuring 34 and causing damage throughout the town.

Cimarron continues to thrive, in part due to its proximity to Philmont Scout Ranch, as well as summer tourism.

As a tribute to many dedicated crew members, the USS Cimarron's key artifacts were donated to Cimarron, since it is the closest village to the Cimarron River Basin's Headwaters. The ship's bell now stands in front of the village's high school, Cimarron High School.

== Geography ==
Cimarron is located in west-central Colfax County on the north bank of the Cimarron River, where it emerges from the Cimarron Range of the Sangre de Cristo Mountains. U.S. Route 64 passes through the village, leading west up the Cimarron Canyon 23 miles (37 km) to Eagle Nest and northeast 40 miles (64 km) to Raton, the Colfax County seat. New Mexico State Road 58 leads east from Cimarron 19 miles (31 km) to Interstate 25, north of Springer.

West of Cimarron is the Palisades Sill, with high cliffs surrounding the Cimarron River.

== Climate ==
Cimarron has a borderline cool semi-arid climate (Köppen BSk) closely bordering on a subtropical highland climate, with summers featuring cool nights and warm days with frequent thunderstorms, and cold winters with occasional heavy snowfall. The lowest temperature recorded in the town was −35 °F (−37 °C).

Climate data for CIMARRON 4 SW, NM (1991–2020 normals, extremes 1904–present)
Month	Jan	Feb	Mar	Apr	May	Jun	Jul	Aug	Sep	Oct	Nov	Dec	Year
Record high °F (°C)	81 (27)	76 (24)	81 (27)	84 (29)	92 (33)	98 (37)	101 (38)	100 (38)	98 (37)	88 (31)	81 (27)	75 (24)	101 (38)
Mean daily maximum °F (°C)	47.6 (8.7)	50.4 (10.2)	58.2 (14.6)	65.0 (18.3)	73.2 (22.9)	82.5 (28.1)	84.3 (29.1)	81.8 (27.7)	77.2 (25.1)	68.1 (20.1)	56.3 (13.5)	47.6 (8.7)	66.0 (18.9)
Daily mean °F (°C)	32.9 (0.5)	34.9 (1.6)	42.0 (5.6)	48.4 (9.1)	56.7 (13.7)	65.6 (18.7)	68.6 (20.3)	66.8 (19.3)	61.0 (16.1)	41.2 (5.1)	40.3 (4.6)	32.5 (0.3)	49.2 (9.6)
Mean daily minimum °F (°C)	18.1 (−7.7)	19.5 (−6.9)	25.8 (−3.4)	31.8 (−0.1)	40.3 (4.6)	48.6 (9.2)	52.8 (11.6)	51.7 (10.9)	44.7 (7.1)	34.4 (1.3)	24.3 (−4.3)	17.4 (−8.1)	34.1 (1.2)
Record low °F (°C)	−32 (−36)	−24 (−31)	−17 (−27)	−2 (−19)	17 (−8)	25 (−4)	40 (4)	36 (2)	16 (−9)	−5 (−21)	−18 (−28)	−17 (−27)	−32 (−36)
Average precipitation inches (mm)	0.66 (17)	0.57 (14)	0.95 (24)	1.51 (38)	1.70 (43)	1.74 (44)	3.03 (77)	3.11 (79)	1.75 (44)	1.22 (31)	0.57 (14)	0.43 (11)	17.24 (438)
Average snowfall inches (cm)	7.0 (18)	7.1 (18)	7.0 (18)	5.0 (13)	0.5 (1.3)	0.0 (0.0)	0.0 (0.0)	0.0 (0.0)	0.0 (0.0)	2.1 (5.3)	5.1 (13)	6.2 (16)	40.0 (102)
Average precipitation days (≥ 0.01 in)	2.8	3.2	4.4	4.5	6.1	6.9	11.0	11.5	6.8	4.1	2.4	2.5	66.2
Average snowy days (≥ 0.1 in)	1.9	2.6	2.4	1.3	0.2	0.0	0.0	0.0	0.0	0.4	1.3	1.8	11.9
Source: NOAA

== Demographics ==
Historical population
Census	Pop.	Note	%±
1880	290		—
1910	791		—
1920	481		−39.2%
1930	698		45.1%
1940	744		6.6%
1950	855		14.9%
1960	997		16.6%
1970	927		−7.0%
1980	888		−4.2%
1990	774		−12.8%
2000	917		18.5%
2010	1,021		11.3%
2020	792		−22.4%
U.S. Decennial Census

According to the United States Census Bureau, the village of Cimarron has a total area of 2.0 square miles (5.2 km^{2}), all land.

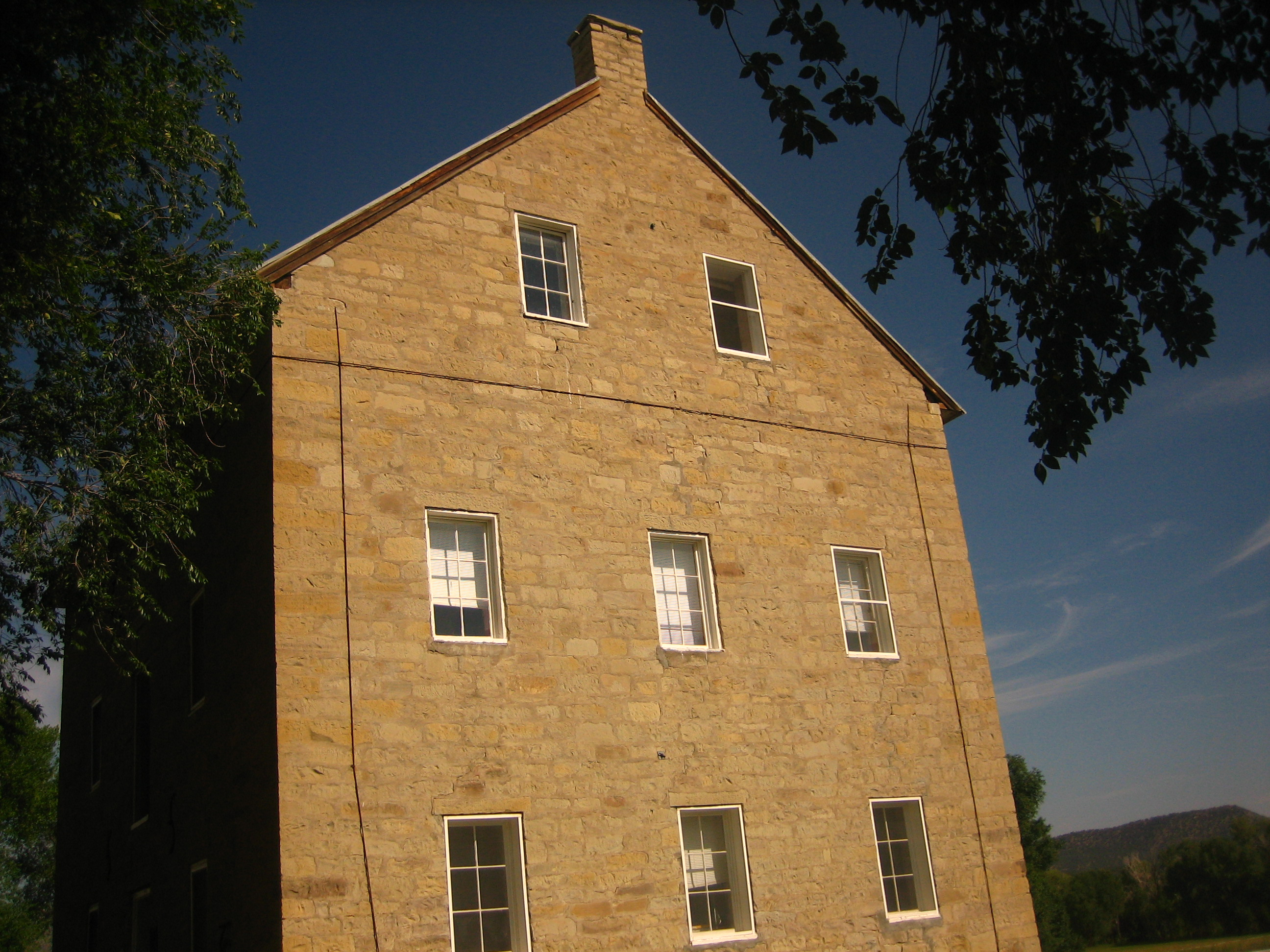
Old Aztec Mill in Cimarron

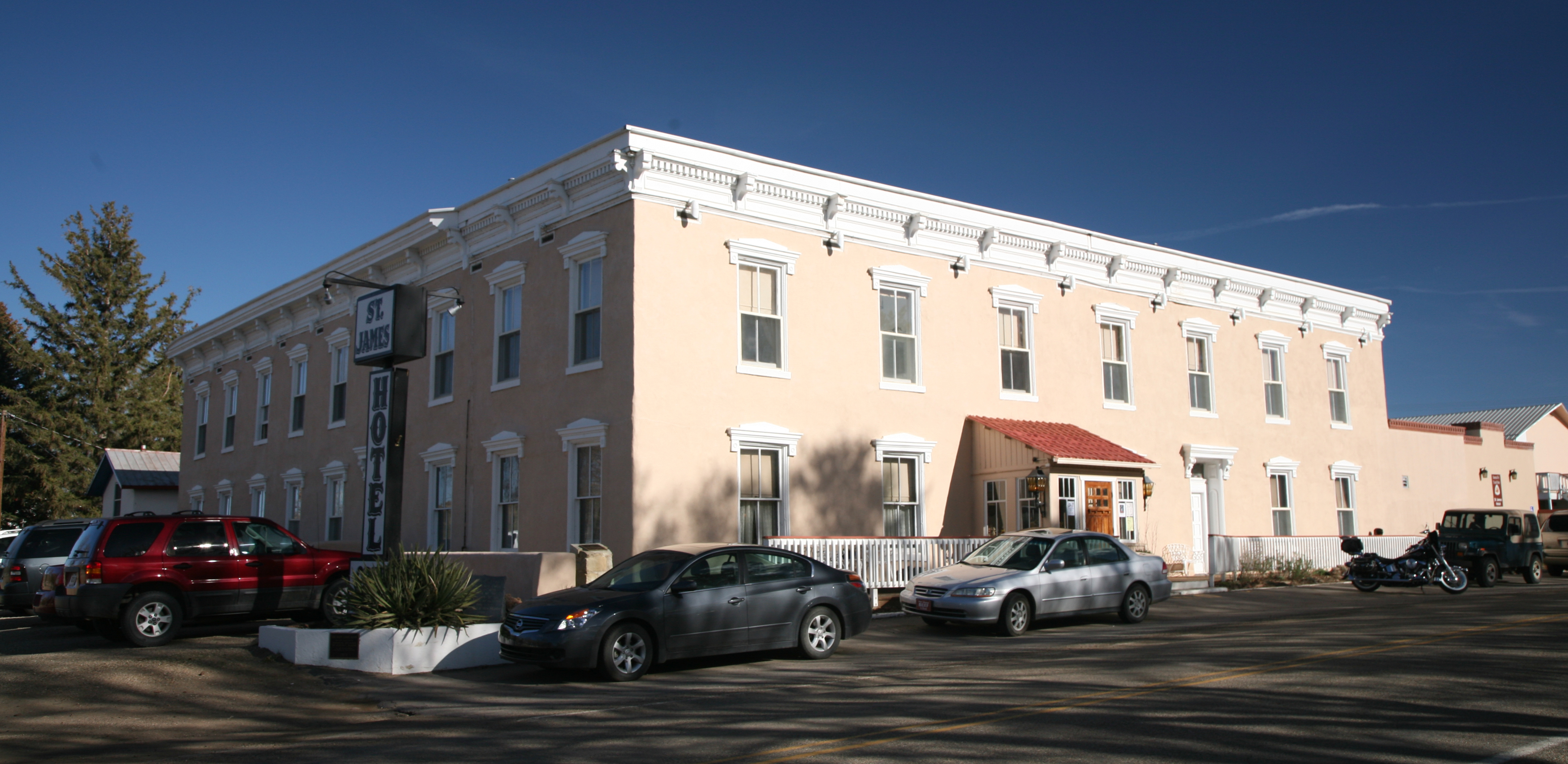
St. James Hotel

As of the census of 2010, there were 1021 people, 382 households, and 255 families residing in the village. The population density was 479.5 inhabitants per square mile (185.1/km^{2}). There were 449 housing units at an average density of 234.8 per square mile (90.7/km^{2}). The racial makeup of the village was 77.54% White, 0.11% African American, 1.09% Native American, 0.11% Asian, 17.23% from other races, and 3.93% from two or more races. Hispanic or Latino of any race were 58.89% of the population.

There were 382 households, out of which 34.0% had children under the age of 18 living with them, 49.2% were married couples living together, 8.1% had a female householder with no husband present, and 33.0% were non-families. 29.1% of all households were made up of individuals, and 13.6% had someone living alone who was 65 years of age or older. The average household size was 2.40 and the average family size was 2.89.

In the village, the population was spread out, with 27.0% under the age of 18, 7.6% from 18 to 24, 25.1% from 25 to 44, 24.1% from 45 to 64, and 16.1% who were 65 years of age or older. The median age was 40 years. For every 100 females, there were 106.5 males. For every 100 females age 18 and over, there were 102.7 males.

The median income for a household in the village was $27,875, and the median income for a family was $30,677. Males had a median income of $26,125 versus $19,792 for females. The per capita income for the village was $14,248. About 9.1% of families and 12.5% of the population were below the poverty line, including 16.1% of those under age 18 and 8.6% of those age 65 or over.

== Education ==
The school district is Cimarron Municipal Schools.

== Tourism ==
- Philmont Scout Ranch
- Old Mill Museum
- Cimarron Historic District and Old Town
- St. James Hotel
- U.S. Route 64 Median Self History Tour
- NRA Whittington Center
- Dawson Cemetery
- Cimarron Canyon State Park
- Casa del Gavilan Historic Inn

== Notable people ==
- Pete Burleson, (1848–1925), cattle rancher, lawman

== See also ==
- Casa del Gavilan Historic Inn (Cimarron, New Mexico)
- Cimarron Historic District
- Ernest Thompson Seton, story-teller
- Maxwell Land Grant
- St. James Hotel (Cimarron, New Mexico)
- Ute Park Fire
- Villa Philmonte, built in 1926 by oil magnate Waite Phillips
