= Cimarron River (Canadian River tributary) =

River in New Mexico, U.S.

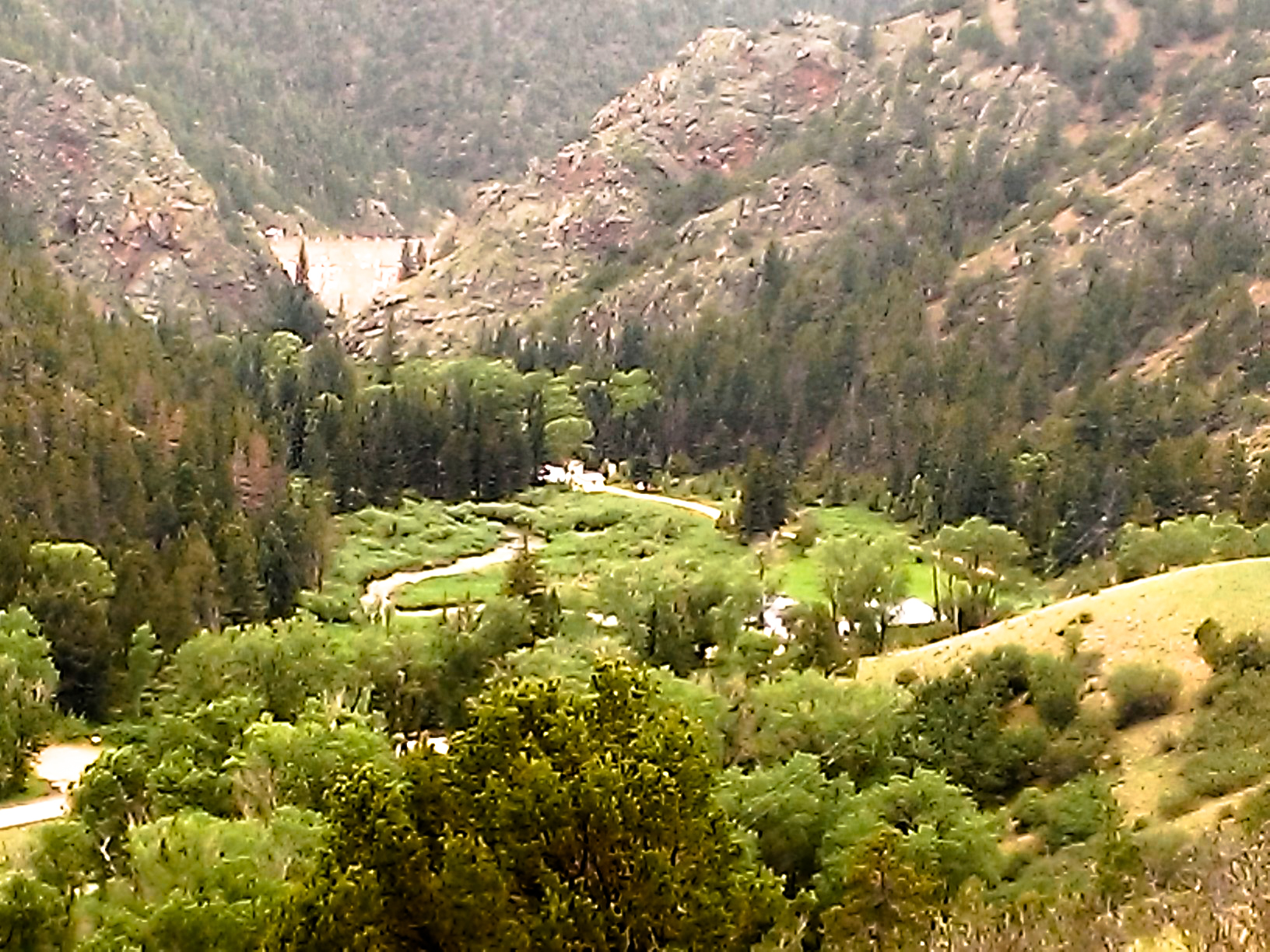
- A view of the Cimarron River as it leaves Eagle Nest Dam

Physical characteristics
- Source
  - coordinates: 36°31′49″N 105°13′41″W
  - elevation: 8,146 ft (2,483 m)
- Mouth
  - location: Confluence with Canadian
  - coordinates: 36°19′27″N 104°29′58″W
  - elevation: 5,679 ft (1,731 m)
- Length: 60 mi (97 km)

Basin features
- Progression: Canadian—Arkansas—Mississippi

The Cimarron River, flowing entirely in New Mexico, United States, was also known as La Flecha or Semarone. Its headwaters are Moreno, Sixmile, and Cieneguilla creeks in the Sangre de Cristo Mountains, which feed into Eagle Nest Dam. From the dam, it runs for 60 miles (97 km) to below the city of Springer, New Mexico, in the Taylor Springs area, where it flows into the Canadian River, the southwesternmost major tributary flowing into the Mississippi River via the Arkansas River sub-basin.

This river flows within a mountainous canyon that is part of Cimarron Canyon State Park in the lower Sangre de Cristo Mountains and runs down into eastern plains of New Mexico. This headwaters region is also home to the Philmont Scout Ranch.

== Etymology ==
Cimarron was first applied to either the river or mountains in northeastern New Mexico and applied to other places in the state. The most common belief is that it was named for the Rocky Mountain bighorn sheep, called carnero cimarrón in New Mexican Spanish. In addition, cimarrónes was the name for cattle and wild horses. Another of several theories is that is named for the plant rosa cimarróna, a wild rose plant that grows along the river.

However, in 1719, it was called La Flecha which means "the arrow", and may refer to the pass, Palo Flechado.

== Irrigation ==
The Cimarron River is primarily used to convey runoff water from the Moreno Valley, to local farmers and ranchers downstream who have water rights from Eagle Nest Lake. There are several diversion points along the river in which water is moved into canals and ditches. The three major irrigation districts are Springer Ditch Company, Antelope valley irrigation district, and Vermejo Conservancy District. Some irrigation water travels 50 miles downstream to locations where it is to be used.

== Climate ==
Climate data for Cimarron
Month	Jan	Feb	Mar	Apr	May	Jun	Jul	Aug	Sep	Oct	Nov	Dec	Year
Mean daily maximum °F (°C)	47 (8)	51 (11)	56 (13)	63 (17)	72 (22)	81 (27)	84 (29)	81 (27)	77 (25)	68 (20)	55 (13)	49 (9)	65 (18)
Mean daily minimum °F (°C)	16 (−9)	19 (−7)	25 (−4)	31 (−1)	39 (4)	48 (9)	52 (11)	51 (11)	44 (7)	33 (1)	23 (−5)	17 (−8)	33 (1)
Average precipitation inches (mm)	0.3 (7.6)	0.3 (7.6)	0.6 (15)	1.7 (43)	2.3 (58)	1.4 (36)	3.3 (84)	2.6 (66)	0.9 (23)	1.1 (28)	0.5 (13)	0.4 (10)	15.5 (390)

== Recreation and wildlife ==
=== State park ===
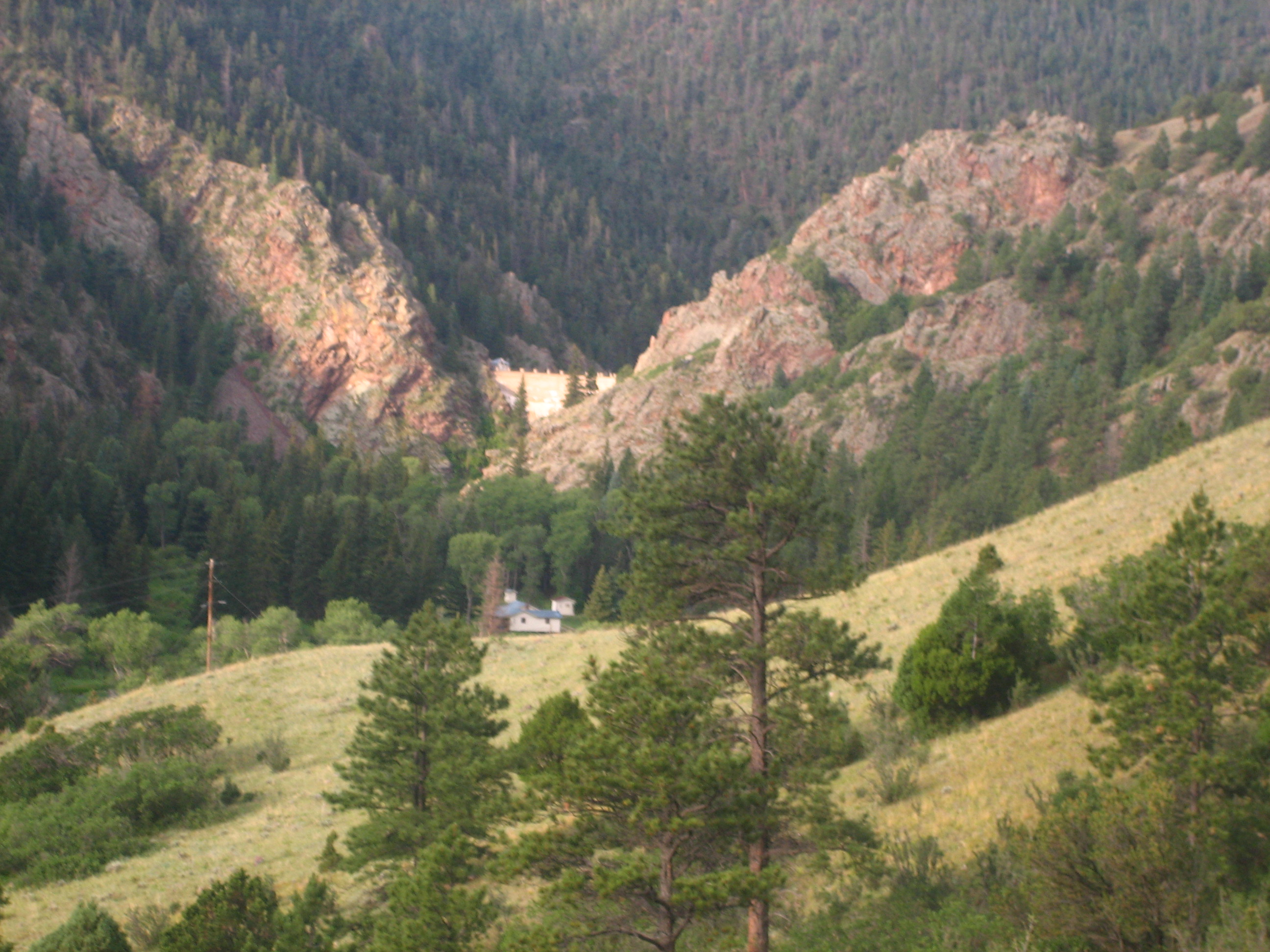
Mountain valley at Cimarron Canyon State Park.

Cimarron Canyon State Park, located along the river, offers equestrian and hiking trails, fly-fishing, and camping. Located within the Colin Neblett Wildlife Management Area, it is near Angel Fire, New Mexico on the Enchanted Circle Scenic Byway.

=== Fishing ===
The first dozen miles of the Cimarron River (from Eagle Nest Lake to Ute Park, New Mexico) are known for fine trout fishing. Stocked trout include rainbow and brown. The river is maintained by the New Mexico Department of Game and Fish at a trout density of approximately 3,000 fish per mile, although water flow can vary between 2 and 50 cubic feet per second.

=== Wildlife ===
The most common wildlife to frequent the region include deer, beavers, mice, squirrels, rabbits, chipmunks, and swallows. Mountain lions, coyotes, and black bears are occasionally spotted as well.

== See also ==
- List of rivers of New Mexico
- Cimarron, New Mexico
- Palo Flechado Pass
- Taos Mountain Trail
