= Philmont Scout Ranch =

Scouting America high adventure base in New Mexico

- Black Bull, symbol of Philmont

- Previous name: Philturn Rocky Mountain Scout Camp
- Owner: Scouting America
- Location: Cimarron, New Mexico
- Country: United States
- Coordinates: 36°27′15″N 104°57′21″W
- Founded: 1938
- Founder: Waite Phillips
- Website philmontscoutranch.org

Philmont Scout Ranch is a ranch located in Colfax County, New Mexico, United States, near the village of Cimarron. Donated by oil baron Waite Phillips, the ranch is owned by Scouting America. It is a high adventure base where crews of Scouts and Venturers take part in backpacking treks and other outdoor activities. The ranch covers nearly 220 square miles (570 km^{2}) of wilderness in the Sangre de Cristo range of the Rocky Mountains. It is the largest youth camp in the world.

Philmont is also home to the Philmont Training Center, the National Scouting Museum, and the Seton Memorial Library. The Training Center is the primary location for Scouting America's national volunteer training programs. Philmont is a working ranch, maintaining small herds of cattle, horses, burros, and bison.

The only documented Tyrannosaurus rex track in the world was discovered within the camp's boundaries in 1993 in North Ponil Canyon by the Anasazi Trail Camp. It was formally identified in 1994.

Scouting America operates three other high adventure camps: Northern Tier in Minnesota, as well as Manitoba and Ontario in Canada; Sea Base in the Florida Keys; and Summit Bechtel Reserve in southern West Virginia.

== Location and geography ==
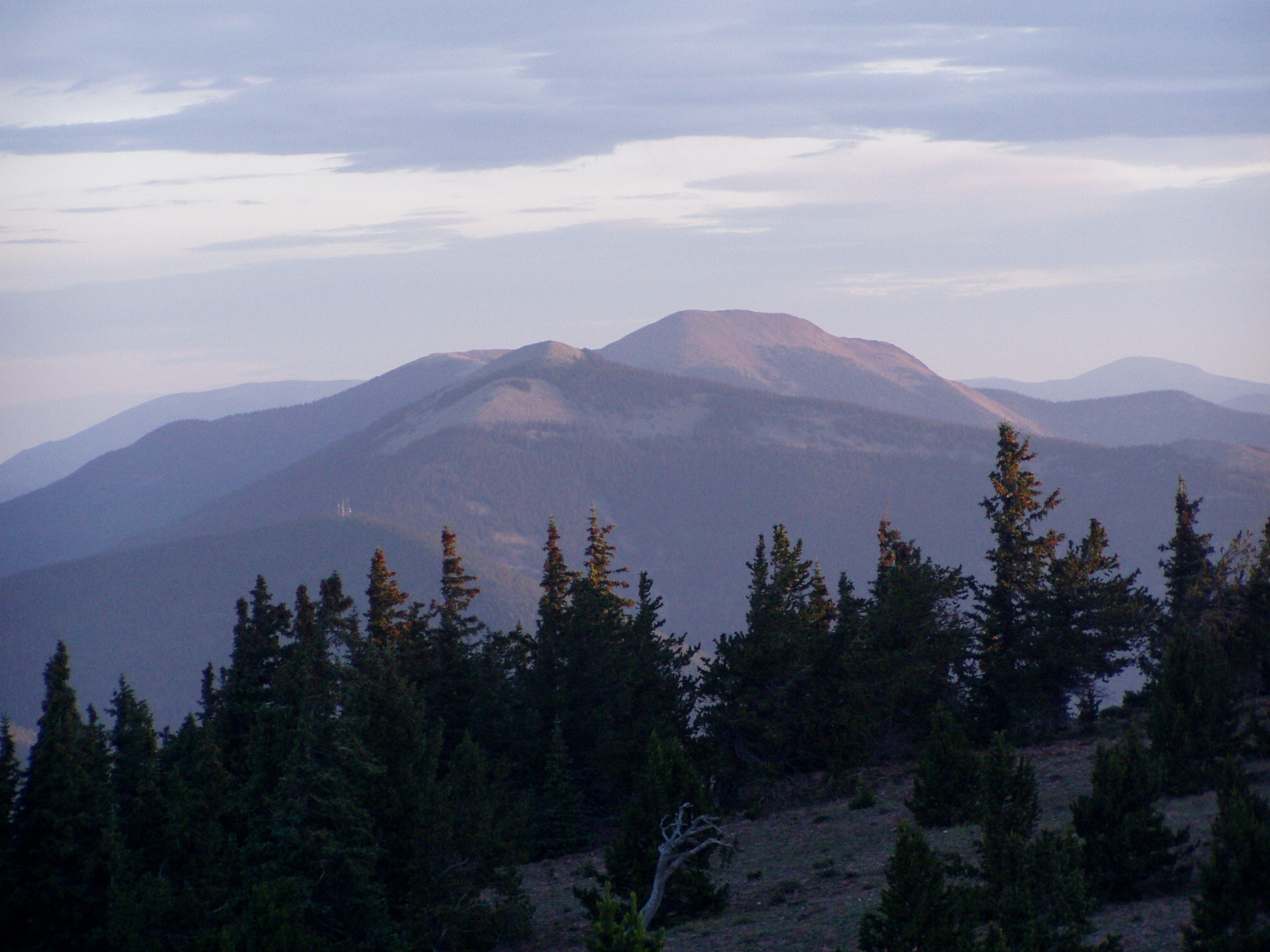
Baldy Mountain, from the peak of Mount Phillips

Philmont Scout Ranch elevation map

Philmont covers 140,177 acres (56,728 ha) of wilderness in the Sangre de Cristo Mountains on the east side of the Cimarron Range of the Rocky Mountains. The closest village is Cimarron, New Mexico. The ranch's address is 17 Deer Run Rd., Cimarron, New Mexico, 87714. It is also about 20 miles (32 km) west-northwest of Springer, New Mexico, and 35 miles (56 km) southwest of Raton, New Mexico. Philmont is about 12 miles (19 km) across (east to west) at its widest point and about 30 miles (48 km) long (north to south). There are no mountains to the south or east of Philmont. The interior of the ranch is mountainous but a small part of the eastern area is prairie.

Philmont's lowest point is the southeast corner at 6,500 feet (2,000 m) and its highest point is the peak of Baldy Mountain, located on the ranch's northwest boundary, at 12,441 feet (3,792 m). Aside from Baldy, the ranch contains several prominent peaks. The South Country is home to a series of six challenging peaks, namely Mount Phillips, Comanche Peak, Big Red, Bear Mountain, Black Mountain, and Schaefers Peak, as well as Trail Peak, which is popular for its nearness to Beaubien, and the wreckage of the crash of a B-24 bomber in 1942 near its summit. Black Mountain is widely considered the most difficult of the ranch's various peaks with trail access, followed closely by Baldy and Big Red.

The most recognizable landmark is the Tooth of Time at 9,003 feet (2,744 m), a dacite monolith protruding 500 feet (150 m) vertically from an east–west ridge. The Tooth of Time Ridge and the latitude line on which it sits marks the boundary between the central and southern sections of Philmont. The boundary between the central and northern sections is around U.S. Route 64, which runs just south of the narrowest part of the 'I'-shape, which is only a few miles across. Other prominent landmarks on the ranch include Grizzly Tooth, Window Rock, Deer Lake Mesa, Wilson Mesa, and Urraca Mesa.

== History ==
Native Americans of the Jicarilla Apache tribe and Ute tribe once inhabited Philmont. A few Native American archaeological sites exist in the northern section near the 'Indian Writings' camp, and various camps seek to preserve Philmont's Native American heritage.

On April 22, 1942, a B-24 Liberator crashed into the side of Trail Peak. Some of the wreckage still remains, including a wing and propeller, and because of its location, it is the world's most visited airplane crash site.

=== Private ownership ===
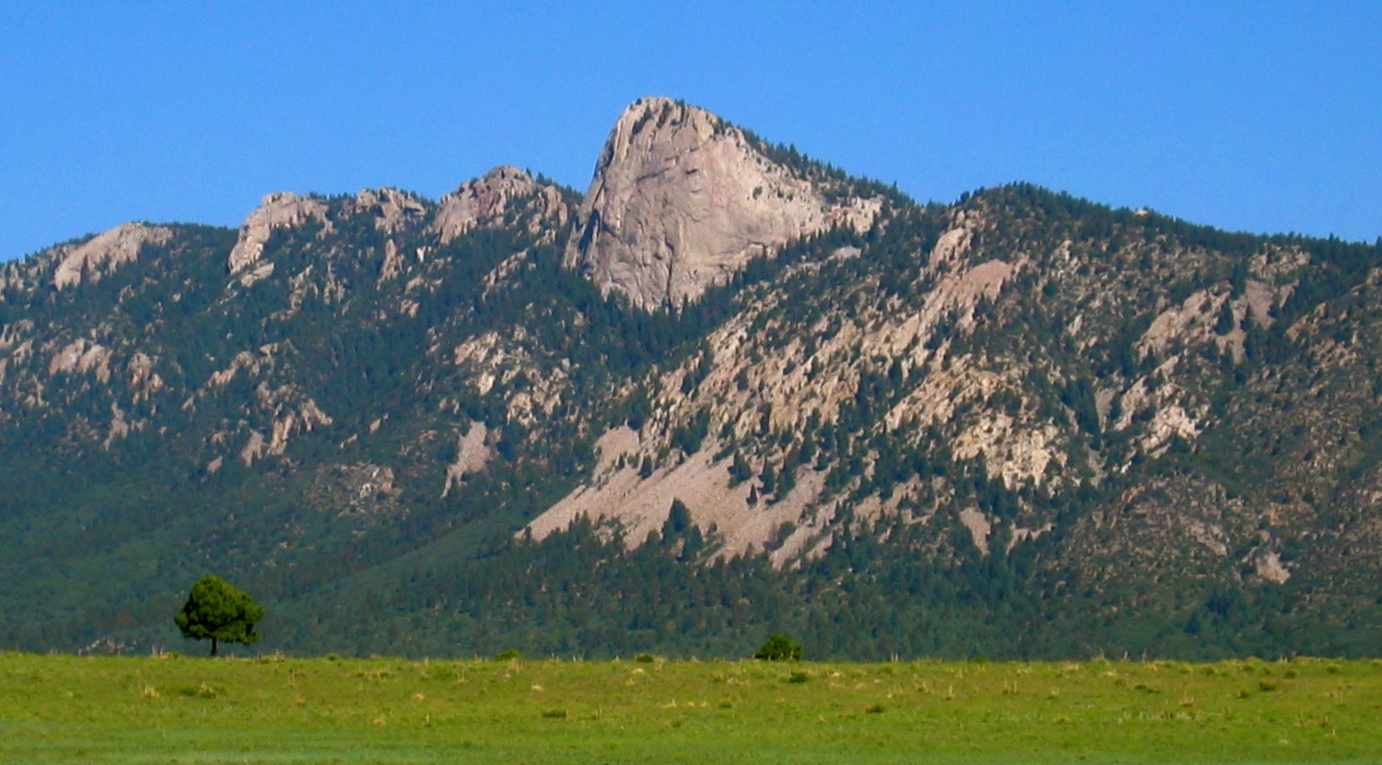
The Tooth of Time, an icon of Philmont Scout Ranch

The Santa Fe Trail crossed the plains southwest of Philmont in the mid-1800s. The Tooth of Time owes its name to this trail; travelers knew that once they passed it, they had only one week to go until they reached Santa Fe, New Mexico. Philmont's strategic location along the trail spurred some interest in it. In 1841, Carlos Beaubien and Guadalupe Miranda obtained a large land grant from the Mexican government, including the present ranch. Soon, the grant passed on to Beaubien's son-in-law Lucien Maxwell, who played an important role in developing and settling it. Maxwell sold the ranch to the Maxwell Land Grant and Railroad Company, giving it up and handing it to a Dutch development company, which decided to parcel it out to ranchers.

One of the most prominent ranchers was Jesus Gil Abreu, who ran the Abreu Rayado Ranch from the 1870s till his death in 1901. Operating from the Rayado Settlement, he raised cattle, goats, and sheep and grew crops. The family owned this property until 1911, when they sold most of it. One of the sons remained on the ranch near the site of Abreu, a present staffed camp, and his homestead was preserved for years. Eventually, the adobe structure was abandoned and collapsed. The foundation of this building now serves as the foundation for the Abreu cantina. The house was reconstructed in 1998 about 100 feet (30 m) uphill.

The history of mining at Philmont dates back to the years immediately after the Civil War. U.S. soldiers were stationed in the West after the war, as the U.S. Army was driving out the Native Americans. At Fort Union, some stationed soldiers traded with Native Americans for float copper. In 1866, the soldiers went up Baldy Mountain in search of this copper, but instead found gold. They could not stay to mine the gold due to the approaching winter, but the area was overrun with prospectors when they returned in the spring. Scores of gold mines were excavated and operated into the early 20th century on what was once the Baldy Mining District, now modern-day Philmont. Today, two mines are located on Philmont property. The Contention Mine, located at Cyphers Mine, and the Aztec Mine, located above French Henry, are open to guided tours.

Wealthy oil magnate and wilderness enthusiast Waite Phillips amassed a large part of the old land grant in the 1920s, totaling over 300,000 acres (1,200 km^{2}). Phillips built a large residence in the lowlands of Philmont. He turned the ranch into a private game reserve for himself and his friends and built several hunting lodges and day-use camps. He chose not to provide electricity at the remote camps. A few of these original camps, including Fish Camp and the Hunting Lodge, have been preserved, complete with wood-burning stoves, oil lamps, and unique design features indicative of Phillips's often eccentric taste.

=== Donated to Boy Scouts ===
Phillips sometimes allowed others, including a few Boy Scout troops, to visit his ranch. He was so impressed with the Scouts that in 1938, during the Great Depression, he donated 35,857 acres (145.11 km^{2}) of his land to the Boy Scouts of America. His only condition was that the property be used "for the benefit of the members of the Boy Scout organization". He donated a second, larger section of land later in the 1930s, requiring only that this section pay its fair share of taxes on any portion devoted to competitive commercial operations. The ranch was originally named Philturn Rocky Mountain Scout Camp.

In 1941, Phillips added more Philmont property, including the Villa Philmonte, bringing the total to 127,395 acres (515.55 km^{2}). Contrary to popular belief, Phillips did not donate his entire ranch to the Boy Scouts, but only that portion of the property that provided the most recreational value. The total donation comprised about 40% of the ranch. To help fund the maintenance of Philmont, he also donated the Philtower office building in Tulsa, Oklahoma. In 1963, vice-president of the National Council Norton Clapp contributed funds to purchase another 10,098 acres (40.87 km^{2}) of land within the Maxwell Land Grant, consisting of the Baldy Mountain mining area. In 2015, the Boy Scouts of America purchased 2,684 acres (10.86 km^{2}) that was once operated as a camp called Cimarroncita Ranch.

In 1989, the Boy Scouts obtained a renewable special use permit to the Valle Vidal Unit of the Carson National Forest from the United States Forest Service. This allowed Scouts to hike and camp in the area. Philmont operates three staffed camps—Whiteman Vega, Seally Canyon, and Ring Place—and two trail camps in that area. Those camps serve around 3,000 Scouts each summer. In return, each camper is asked to contribute three hours of conservation work in the Valle on projects approved by the Forest Service.

=== 2019 mortgage ===
Philmont was mortgaged in March 2019 to support the BSA financially while it was settling sexual abuse cases. An oversight committee member claimed that this violated the 1938 donation that gave the organization the land, but the BSA disagreed.

=== Early organization ===
In its early days, Philmont had a half dozen "base camps" constructed at strategic locations. Visiting Scouts lived at one of these camps for a week and could take day hikes to surrounding locations. To visit a different area, the Scouts packed their gear onto burros and hiked to another base camp. Today, the program is based on backpacking, and Scouts carry all their gear, living in tents while on expeditions.

== Programs and activities ==
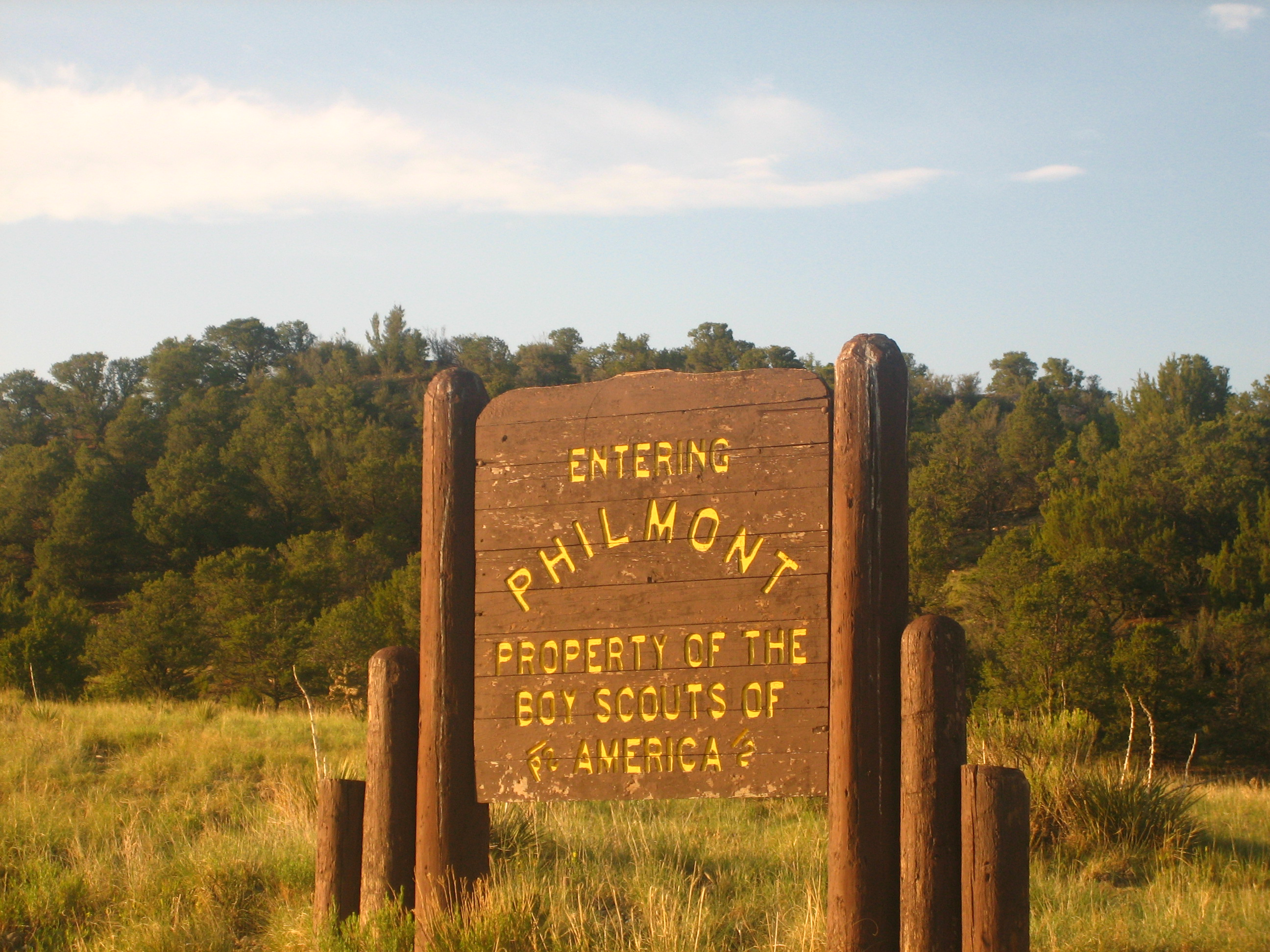
Entrance sign at Philmont

=== Trek ===
The standard and most popular Philmont program is the backpacking trek. Groups travel in a "crew" with 8-12 people. A typical Philmont trek lasts either 7, 9, or 12 days and covers anywhere from 56 miles (90 km) to 106 miles (171 km).

=== Conservation Department ===
There are six divisions of the Conservation Department in the summer, each led by an associate director of Conservation – Work Crew, Forestry Crew, Conservationists, GIS, Environmental Education (ROCS, Trail Crew Trek), and Order of the Arrow Trail Crew. Work Crews are staff groups responsible for maintaining and creating campsites and trails. Trail Crews and other staff, known as Advanced Teams, are the first Conservation staffers to begin hiking and clearing the trails one month before the first participants arrive. Conservationists live in staff camps or spike camps and lead conservation projects for treks passing through their camp. The GIS staff map trails, campsites, and other features of the Philmont Backcountry. In recognition of the 100th anniversary of the BSA, Northrop Grumman donated high-resolution geospatial data of the ranch to Philmont. GIS and the Conservation Department use the data to create enhanced maps and improve conservation efforts throughout the ranch. The Division of Forestry's priority is forest fuel reduction. Using chainsaws, a masticator, a skidder, and a portable sawmill, these crews create defensible space around staff camps and strategic shaded fuel breaks to reduce the risk of catastrophic wildfire and improve the health and productivity of Philmont's forests while utilizing the wood in construction projects around the Ranch. Slash from the thinning projects is piled and burned, and a prescribed fire program is being developed to maintain desired forest conditions. The Forestry crews work year-round, and each staff member receives detailed training in chainsaw operations, as well as an overview of forest management and fire ecology.

==== Roving Outdoor Conservation School ====
The Roving Outdoor Conservation School (ROCS), started in 2000, is a twenty-one-day trek program that is open to males and females between the ages of sixteen and twenty-one. ROCS is an educational backpacking experience rooted in conservation and environmental science education. Throughout the trek, participants have lessons rooted in environmental science, visits from guest speakers, and the opportunity to work on conservation projects with the Philmont Conservation Department and the U.S. Forest Service in the Valle Vidal Unit of the Carson National Forest. While on the trail participants learn about ecology, botany, dendrology, geology, hydrology, forestry, soil science, fire ecology, environmental policy, leave no trace principles, environmental ethics, conservation techniques, and wildlife, range, and land management practices. Participants tackle conservation projects ranging from trail building, meadow encroachment, timber stand improvement, erosion control, and streambed restoration. Participants are exposed to the land management challenges facing the West and the rest of America. The program focuses on empowering participants so that they may transfer what they learn on the trail to their lives back home.

=== Ranger Department ===
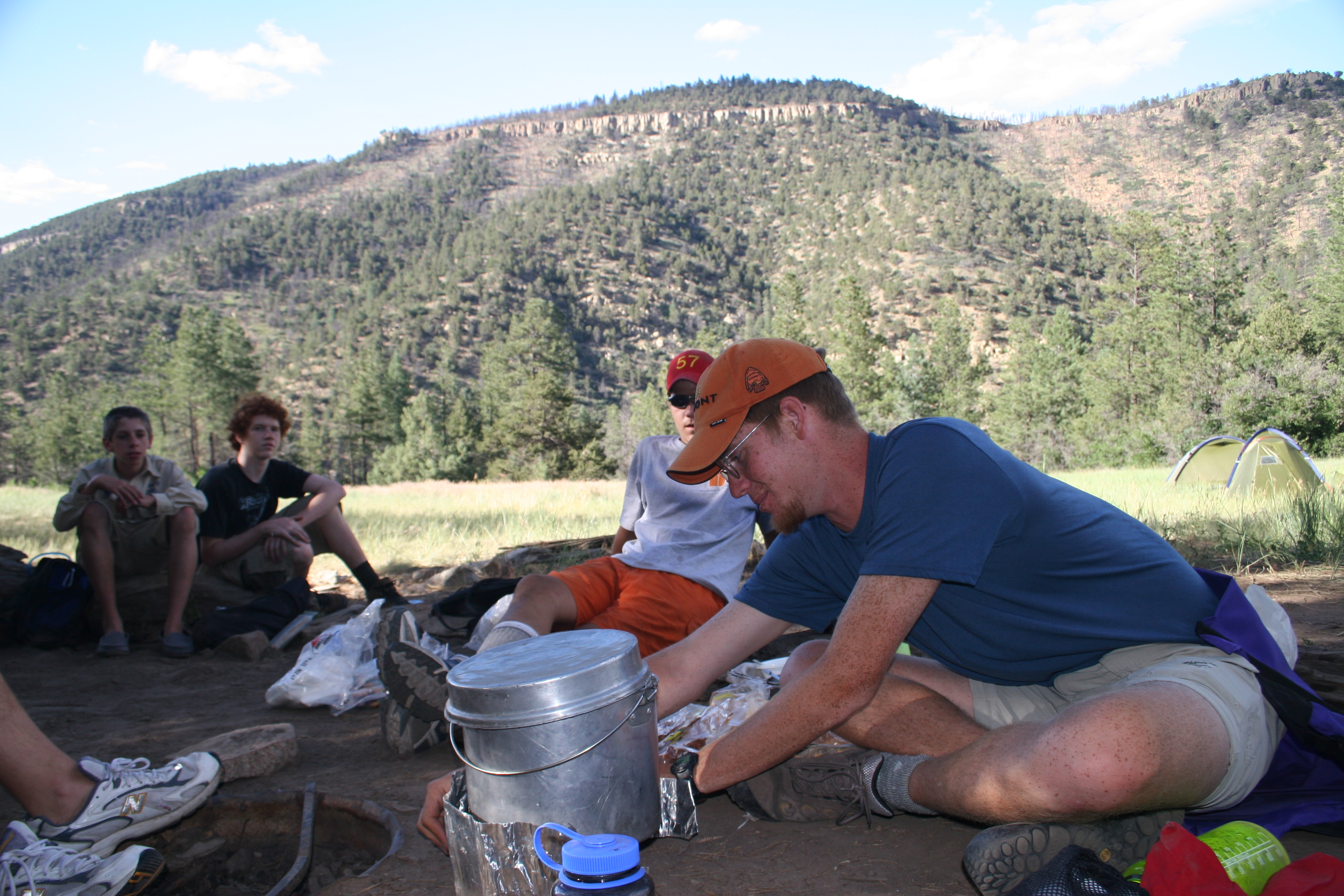
A Ranger helping Scouts on their first day at Philmont

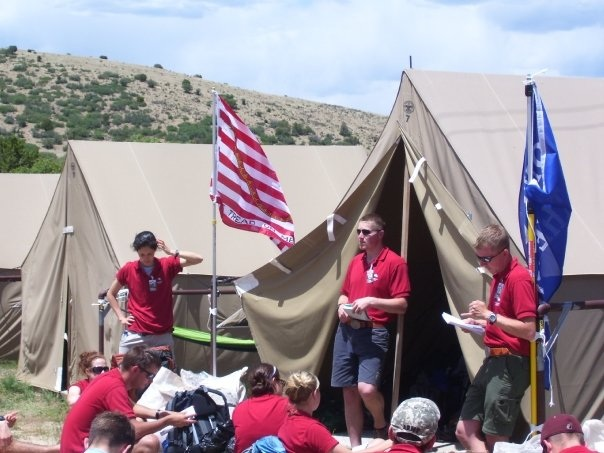
Service Academy Rangers undergoing training

The Ranger Department was founded in 1957 by Clarence E. Dunn, Jack Rhea, and Dr. Ray Loomis, the former chief ranger for 14 years. Rangers are responsible for ensuring that all participants know all required skills and procedures for backcountry treks and for coaching the youth leadership to help them develop their skills and confidence and have a successful trek.

=== Ranch Hands ===
A program in which young men and women can earn a discounted eight-day Cavalcade trek at Philmont by participating in an eight-day work session. Participants work with the Horse Department staff, caring for Philmont's 250 head of horses and 80 head of burros. Participants helped by hauling hay and feed, saddling horses, keeping the horses shod, and assisting with Philmont trail rides. The work can be strenuous and requires top physical and mental conditioning. After the eight-day work session, the Ranch Hands crew gathers together and embarks on an eight-day Cavalcade under the leadership of a Horseman and Wrangler.

=== National Advanced Youth Leadership Experience ===
National Advanced Youth Leadership Experience (NAYLE) is a high-intensity Scout leadership course taught at Philmont Scout Ranch. It is based on backcountry high adventure skills and began in the summer of 2006 replacing the previous National Junior Leader Instructor Course. The course is available to Scouts and Venturers aged 14 through 20 who have completed their local council National Youth Leadership Training (NYLT) course and is held during six one-week sessions. Based at Philmont's Rayado Ridge Leadership Camp and taught at various locations across Philmont Scout Ranch, the program hones youth leadership skills through ethical decision making and participation in Philmont Ranger backcountry training.

=== Historic programs ===
==== Philbreak ====
The Philbreak program ran from 2003 to 2009 and returned in 2019. It was an "alternative spring break" program started in 2003 to help restore Philmont Scout Ranch after devastating forest fires. From 2004 to 2007, the participants worked on the Urraca Trail, which is intended as a day hike for those attending the Philmont Training Center. Participants in the seven-day program were expected to work eight- or nine-hour days in all types of conditions. The program took place during three separate weeks in March. Participants also took a ski break at Angel Fire. In 2008, the program's design switched to mirror that of Philmont's Kanik. Participants spent three days and two nights in Philmont's backcountry and were provided service on the final day. The program ended in 2010. In 2019, after the Ute Park Fire in 2018, Philbreak returned with four week-long sessions in March to help with fire mitigation.

== Philmont facilities ==
=== Camps ===
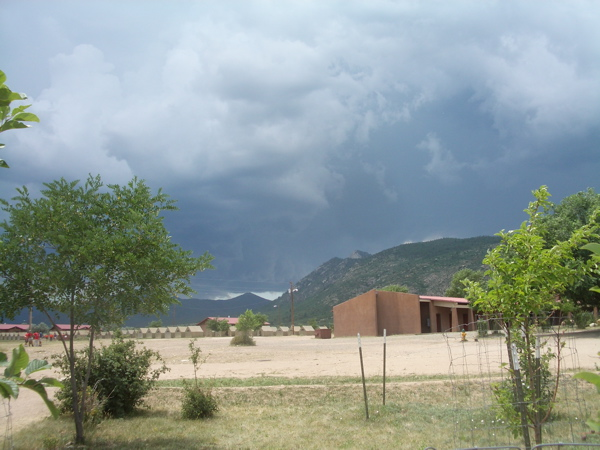
Base camp's "Tent City" where departing and returning treks are staged

Philmont operates from one large base camp, including Camping Headquarters, the National Scouting Museum, the Philmont Training Center and Villa Philmonte, fire response facilities, cattle headquarters, and an administration area.

== Natural disasters ==
=== 1960 tornado ===
On June 25, 1960, a Fujita scale F0 tornado swept through Philmont's base camp area, downing about 300 tents located on a flat near Ranch Headquarters and depositing camping gear over Tooth of Time Ridge. Four 1960 National Jamboree troops from New Mexico—Troops 78, 79, 80, and 82—had gathered at Philmont for a shakedown camp. Three other New Mexico troops had gone to Camp Zia for their shakedown. The troops had 32 boys, two assistant scoutmasters, and one scoutmaster. Troops were camping in wall tents, which they had decorated before going to the Jamboree. Each wall tent had a wooden frame with a thick wooden roof pole for support. The boys were learning how to cook over charcoal fires, and the fires had just started for the evening meal. The twister arrived without warning. As the wind suddenly increased, boys ran to secure the tents, but to no avail. The winds swept up tents, fires, and men and boys, rolling nearby automobiles and leveling the camp. Injuries included broken bones, blunt force injuries from flying debris—including shattered roof poles—and burns from charcoal fires and equipment ignited by the fires. The twister also leveled a nearly completed cinder block chapel. After the passage of the storm, gear, and equipment could be seen in the funnel cloud as it left the area. Camping equipment was found as far as 14 miles (23 km) from the campsite and recovered by ranch hands. Boys were housed for the night in other facilities, and the next day, boys passed among piles of recovered equipment to reclaim what they could. Although there were no fatalities, 33 Scouts and a Scout leader received injuries.

=== 1965 flash flood ===
On June 17, 1965, a large flash flood occurred at Philmont. Heavy rain throughout the area caused waters in Rayado Canyon and the Cimarron River to rise to extreme levels; up to 12.42 feet (3.79 m) at the highest. After June 17, water levels gradually decreased over the course of several days. The impacts of the flood included the destruction of several campsites and the loss of many old photographs and documents kept at Philmont, however no injuries or deaths resulted from the flood. The flood occurred during an El Niño year.

=== Ponil Complex Fire ===
The Ponil Complex Fire started on June 2, 2002, and burned until June 17. The burn zone covered 92,000 acres (370 km^{2}) total; 28,000 acres (110 km^{2}) of Philmont, 4,000 acres (16 km^{2}) of the Elliott Barker Wildlife Area, 25,000 acres (100 km^{2}) of the Valle Vidal, 20,000 acres (81 km^{2}) of the WS Ranch and 15,000 acres (61 km^{2}) of the UU Bar Ranch. One-third of the burn zone was burned, while another-third was light to moderately burned. About one-third of the burn zone escaped relatively unharmed due to sections of valleys that the fire jumped over or were not as dry out and likely to burn because of nearby water.

=== 2015 flash flood ===
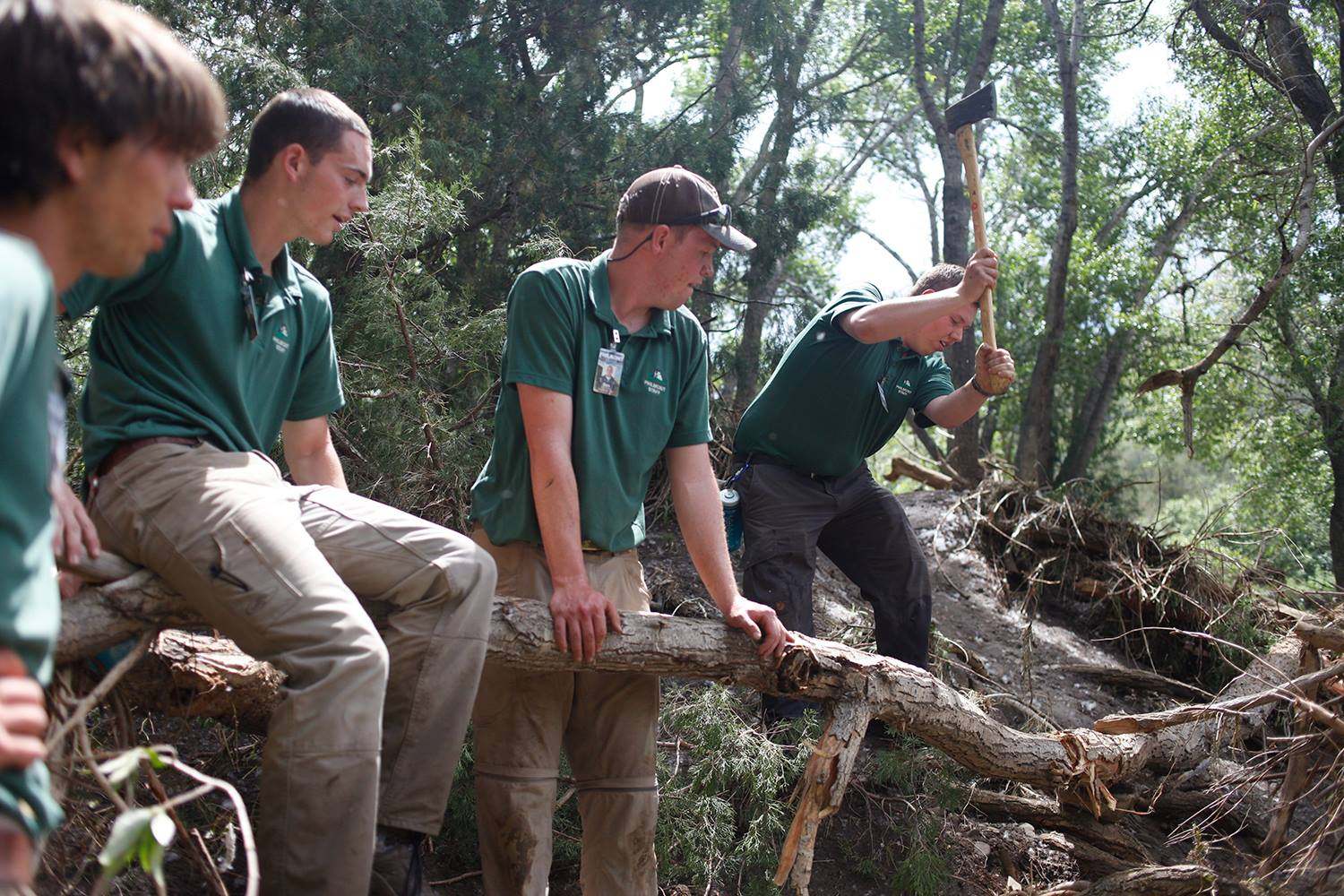
Staff members clear a trail after the 2015 flash flood

On the morning of June 27, 2015, heavy rain occurred in a great portion of Philmont, causing a flash flood. The flood also affected some other nearby areas in Colfax County that morning, including highways and small towns around Philmont. One youth Scout, Alden Brock, who was situated in a campsite within the staff camp Indian Writings, drowned while being swept away by the flood and died. Brock's death received nationwide attention, especially from the Scouting community.

=== Ute Park Fire ===
On May 31, 2018, a wildfire started 1-mile (1.6 km) east of the community Ute Park, New Mexico. By the morning of June 1, the Ute Park Fire had almost doubled in size to 8,000 acres (32 km^{2}), burning entirely on private land, including Philmont Scout Ranch. Twelve structures at Philmont, all unoccupied and non-residential, were reported as burned. All backcountry treks at Philmont Scout Ranch for the entire 2018 summer season were canceled, though PTC courses—including the National Advanced Youth Leadership Experience—remained in session. The fire burned a total of 26,000 acres at Philmont, damaging 200 campsites.

=== Cooks Peak Fire ===
On April 17, 2022, a wildfire started 10 miles (16 km) south of the Kit Carson Museum at Rayado. The areas impacted by the fire include northern Mora County and southern Colfax County. The cause still remains under investigation. Zastrow Cabin, which was located in Philmont's south country, was destroyed. Philmont staff and wildland firefighter personnel have wrapped the Fish camp Cabin and other buildings within the south country. The fire was largely contained before the season began, allowing crews to proceed with their treks as normal.

== Notable former staff ==
- Wally Berg – Ranger in the 1970s and Director of Conservation; first American to summit Lhotse in 1990.
- Steve Fossett – Ranger in 1961; also served on the Philmont Ranch Committee, Later a record-breaking aviator.
- Donald Rumsfeld – 1949 guide (forerunner to the Rangers), later United States Secretary of Defense.
- R.W. Hampton – Wrangler from 1974 to 1976; cowboy and later a nationally recognized singer.
- David Goldfein – Ranger in 1980; US Air Force General and 21st Chief of Staff of the United States Air Force.

== Astronaut training ==
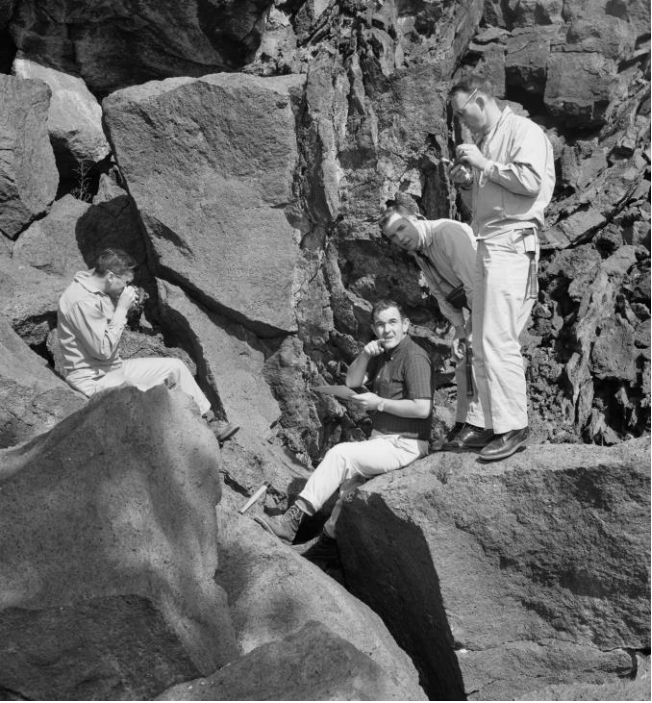
Astronaut Training at Philmont in June 1964

NASA and the USGS used the site to geologically train the Apollo Astronauts in June 1964. In the words of Phinney, the site was "...probably more like lunar geology." Training included recognizing "both igneous and sedimentary rocks, orientation with geological maps, measuring and describing stratigraphic sections, strike and dip measurements, recording of field notes ... and geophysical traverses that included taking measurements with magnetometers, gravimeters and seismometers in an attempt to determine subsurface structure." Astronauts who would use this training on the Moon included Apollo 11's Neil Armstrong and Buzz Aldrin, Apollo 12's Pete Conrad and Alan Bean, Apollo 15's David Scott, and Apollo 17's Gene Cernan. Notable geologist instructors included G.D. Robinson.

== See also ==
- Chase Ranch
- James P. Fitch
- Geography and ecology of Philmont Scout Ranch
- Girl Scout National Center West
- Mount Phillips (New Mexico)
- Vermejo Park Ranch
- Wilderness Grace
