= Chase Ranch =

Ranch in Cimarron, New Mexico, US

- Owner: Chase Ranch Foundation, run by Boy Scouts of America
- Location: Cimarron, New Mexico
- Country: United States
- Coordinates: 36°34′32″N 105°02′46″W
- Founded: 1867
- Founders: Manly and Theresa Chase
- Website; Philmont Scout Ranch

Chase Ranch in Cimarron, New Mexico, was founded in 1867 by Manly and Theresa Chase. As pioneers, from Wisconsin by way of Colorado, they crossed the Raton Pass in a covered wagon and establish a new home in New Mexico. Manly Chase purchased the land from Lucien Maxwell, part of the Maxwell Land Grant. The ranch is near the Ponil Creek, a mile north of the Cimarron River, not far from the Santa Fe Trail. The Ranch included the old Kit Carson homestead. Before the arrival of pioneers, the land was populated by Apaches and Ute people. Manly provided the local Native Americans with beef, creating peaceful coexistence.

== Background ==
Manly Chase (b. 1842) started with a sheep ranch. By 1875, he started raising cattle with Texas Longhorns and Corriente cattle. Hereford cattle were introduced onto the ranch in 1883. Manly also planted an apple orchard that continues today. Manly and Theresa Chase raised six children in their 14-room ranch house.

The Chase Ranch is famous for its heart-shaped brand and allegedly the Marlboro Man's place of origin. Much is known about the Chase family as Manly Chase wrote more than 70 books of records, including several daily diaries that are now in the New Mexico State University Library.

The Chase Ranch remained a family-owned ranch run by Chase descendants. This ended in August 2012, when Manly and Theresa's great-granddaughter Gretchen Sammis died. After Gretchen’s death, ownership of the ranch changed to the Chase Ranch Foundation. Gretchen had created the foundation to preserve the 11,000-acre ranch and her family’s heritage. Gretchen Sammis owned and operated the ranch for 58 years. Long before her death in August 2012, she had drafted the Chase Ranch Foundation paperwork. She wanted the Chase Ranch to educate young people in ranching. She was secretary of the Cimarron School Board, a member of the National Cowgirl Hall of Fame and 2007 New Mexico Cattleman of the year. She was appointed to the New Mexico Soil and Water Conservation Commission, the agriculture advisory committee to the state land office, and the New Mexico Resource Advisory Council.

On October 21, 2013, the Chase Ranch Foundation and the Boy Scouts of America signed an agreement for Philmont Scout Ranch to keep the ranch running and to preserve historic structures, manage a Chase museum, to create and run educational programs through living history presentations of New Mexico and American Southwest history, and to run a working cattle ranch with Gretchen's favorite breed, Herefords. Chase Ranch is adjacent to Philmont Scout Ranch. Beginning November 1, 2013, Philmont Scout Ranch gives tours of the main Chase house, Chase grounds, Chase orchards and Chase's tack room during the summer. The BSA has also installed restrooms and a picnic area at the Chase Ranch.

Chase Ranch is near New Mexico State Road 204, in the 87714 zip code and 575 area code

== See also ==
- Cimarron Historic District
- St. James Hotel (Cimarron, New Mexico)
- Villa Philmonte - Built in 1926 by oil magnate Waite Phillips
