= Lucien Maxwell =

American rancher and frontiersman (1818–1875)

Lucien Bonaparte Maxwell
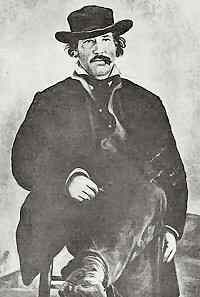
- Maxwell in an undated photo
- Born: September 14, 1818; Kaskaskia, Illinois Territory
- Died: July 25, 1875 (aged 56); Fort Sumner, New Mexico Territory
- Resting place: Old Fort Sumner Cemetery, Fort Sumner, New Mexico; 34°24'14.0"N 104°11'34.1"W
- Education: Vincentian college in Missouri
- Occupations: Mountain man, rancher, scout, farmer
- Spouse: Luz Beaubien

Lucien Bonaparte Maxwell (September 14, 1818 – July 25, 1875) was an American mountain man, rancher, scout, and farmer who at one point owned more than 1,700,000 acres (6,900 km^{2}). Along with Thomas Catron and Ted Turner, Maxwell was one of the largest private landowners in United States history. In 1959, he was inducted into the Hall of Great Westerners of the National Cowboy & Western Heritage Museum.

== Background ==
Maxwell was born in Kaskaskia, Illinois Territory, about three months before Illinois became a state. He was the son of Hugh Maxwell, an Irish immigrant, and Odile Menard, daughter of Pierre Menard, a French-Canadian fur trader who was serving on the Illinois Territorial Council and who became the first Lieutenant Governor of the State of Illinois shortly after Maxwell's birth. Lucien Maxwell learned something of the fur trading business from his maternal grandfather during his early teens, and his grandfather was Maxwell's role model. Like his famous grandfather, Maxwell left home at the age of fifteen. Maxwell's cousin Michel Branamour Menard established a trading post that ultimately grew into Galveston, Texas, and early neighbor Stephen Austin was the namesake of the capital of Texas. At age 17, after two years at the Vincentian college in Missouri, Lucien struck out on his own, heading west.

He met and became fast friends with Kit Carson, who was almost nine years older. Both eventually signed up with John C. Frémont in 1841 for western expeditions, with Carson serving as guide and Maxwell as chief hunter.

== Beaubien and Miranda ==
In 1844, Lucien Maxwell travelled to Taos, New Mexico (then part of Mexico) where he married Carlos Beaubien's daughter, Maria de la Luz Beaubien. It was a dual wedding as Kit Carson was also married. In 1843 Beaubien and his partner, Guadalupe Miranda, had received a land grant of a million acres (4,000 km^{2}) in northeast present-day New Mexico. Beaubien's wedding gift to Maxwell was 15,000 acres (61 km^{2}).

During the Mexican–American War, in 1847, Maxwell was at Fort Bent in Colorado. He was there when the newly installed New Mexico Territorial Governor Charles Bent was killed in the Taos Revolt. Maxwell's wife survived but her brother (Beaubien's son) Narciso Beaubien was killed. Maxwell's mother-in-law, Miranda, was wounded and fled to Mexico. After that, Maxwell became more active in the management of the Beaubien land grant.

In 1848, Maxwell survived an ambush while delivering supplies to a cabin on Ponil Creek. In 1849, at the conclusion of the Mexican–American War, Maxwell and Carson proposed building a fort on the Rayado River at Rayado in the new New Mexico Territory, on the Santa Fe Trail. Maxwell built a large house and Carson had a smaller adobe house.

In 1850 the Army moved its fort 30 miles (48 km) further south to Fort Union on the Mora River. Maxwell sold his Rayado property and moved to Cimarron, New Mexico Territory, which was on the Cimarron River. Here he built a large adobe mansion where scores of people would often be luxuriously entertained and fed by many servants.

== Maxwell Land Grant ==
In 1858, Miranda, who was still in Mexico, sold his share of the 1,000,000-acre (4,000 km^{2}) of land to Maxwell for $2,745. After Beaubien died in 1864, Maxwell acquired much of the original estate that he had not inherited; his landholdings then peaked at 1,714,765 acres (6,939.41 km^{2}). The entire area is referred to as the Maxwell Land Grant.

== Discovery of gold ==
At the conclusion of the American Civil War, gold was discovered on his property at present-day Baldy Mountain (Colfax County, New Mexico). Maxwell leased land to the miners and sold them supplies.

In 1870, he sold most of the land for $1,350,000 to a British company, which incorporated it under the name of the Maxwell Land Grant and Railway Company. A portion of the land was purchased by Matthew Lynch who became the father of placer mining in the region.

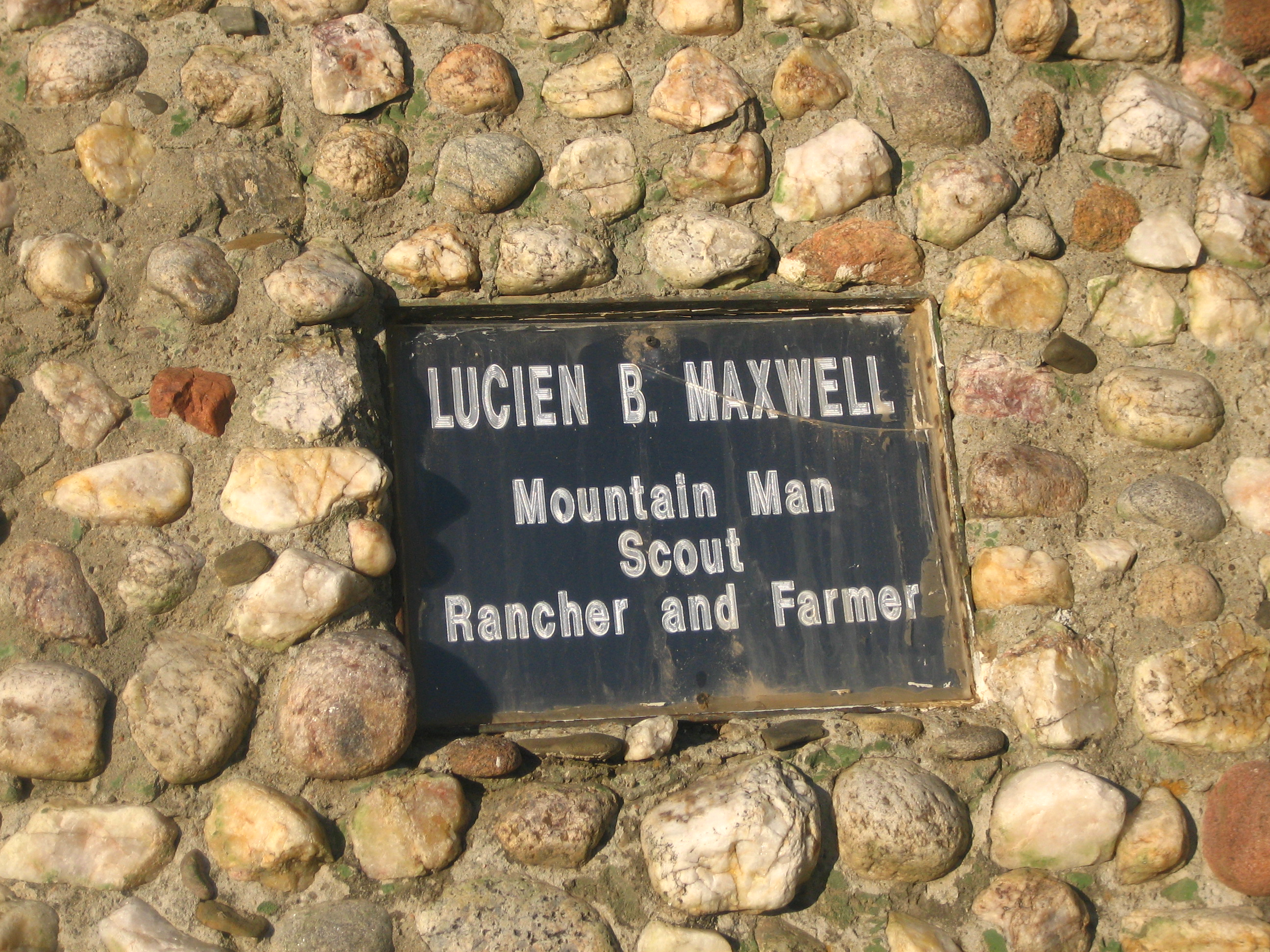
Plaque on Statue of Lucien B. Maxwell in Mountainview Cemetery in Cimarron, New Mexico

Maxwell then moved to Fort Sumner, New Mexico Territory, which he purchased from the US government in 1869 when Fort Sumner was abandoned. Maxwell and his family renovated the former officers' quarters into a beautiful Spanish Colonial house surrounding a large inner courtyard. Maxwell died at Fort Sumner in 1875.

== Colfax County War ==
Pat Garrett killed the outlaw Billy the Kid at Maxwell's Fort Sumner home in 1881, which was then owned by Pete Maxwell, son of Lucien Maxwell. Legend has it that Billy had a love affair with Pete's sister, Paulita Maxwell (later Jaramillo). Billy was buried a few feet from Lucien Maxwell in Fort Sumner, New Mexico Territory.

After Maxwell sold the grant, the armed struggle between the new owners and squatters came to be known as the Colfax County War. Litigation over whether his land claims were legitimate would continue until 1887 when the United States Supreme Court approved a clear title.

== Philmont Scout Ranch ==
Today, the land grant is broken into many private and public landholdings. These large private landholdings include the Philmont Scout Ranch, Ted Turner's Vermejo Park Ranch, Chase Ranch, CS Ranch, Express UU Bar Ranch, and the NRA Whittington Center range complex.

== See also ==
- Cimarron Historic District
- St. James Hotel (Cimarron, New Mexico)
- Villa Philmonte – Built in 1926 by oil magnate Waite Phillips
