= Jesus Gil Abreu =

New Mexico rancher and pioneer

Jesus G. Abreu
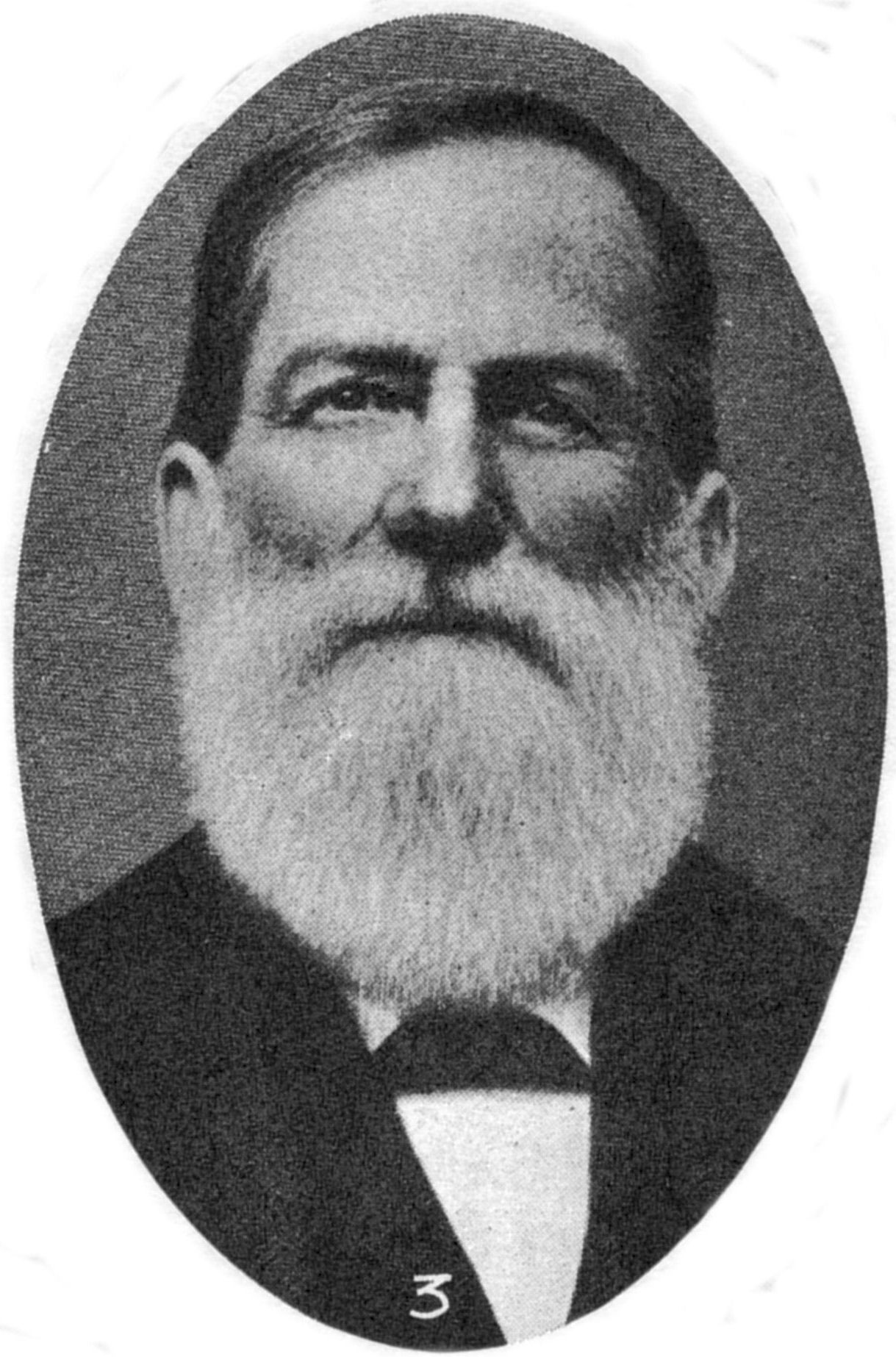
- Jesus Gil Abreu, a leading citizen of New Mexico in the 19th century
- Born: September 1, 1823; Santa Fe, New Mexico
- Died: June 30, 1900 (aged 76)
- Occupation: Rancher

Jesus Gil Abreu (September 1, 1823 – June 30, 1900) was an American rancher and pioneer who owned a New Mexico ranch that now comprises Philmont Scout Ranch.

== Early years ==
He was born in Santa Fe, New Mexico. His father was on the staff of New Mexico Governor Albino Pérez and was killed along with the governor during the Revolt of 1837 (New Mexico).

After the revolt, he headed east on the Santa Fe Trail where he worked for Kansas City, Missouri founder John Calvin McCoy at Westport, Kansas City and Independence, Missouri.

== Mexican–American War ==
During the Mexican–American War in 1845, he was engaged by a sutler to be an interpreter for the United States Army. When the troops were dispatched to Santa Fe, Ceran St. Vrain dispatched Abreu in advance to buy up the goods of competing sutlers for St. Vrain so it could enjoy a monopoly with the United States.

Abreu worked in a store for St. Vrain in Santa Fe, and worked as an interpreter for the United States and in the winter of 1848–49 delivered the U.S. mail between Santa Fe and Fort Leavenworth, Kansas (a process which took 40 days).

== California Gold Rush ==
During the California Gold Rush he traveled to California in 1850–51.

== Return to New Mexico ==
When he returned to New Mexico, he worked for Joseph Pley, a partner of Lucien B. Maxwell who, after marrying the daughter of Carlos Beaubien, had become the owner of the million-acre Maxwell Land Grant.

He at first worked in Mora, New Mexico and then at the Maxwell store in Rayado.

== Ranch ==
On November 26, 1859, he married Petrita Beaubien, another daughter of Beaubien. In 1862, he acquired 20,000 acres (81 km^{2}) of the land grant for his Abreu Ranch.

A history of New Mexico described the ranch house as "one of the most picturesque and attractive in New Mexico and is the scene of a most generous hospitality."

The family sold most of the ranch in 1911 after his death and was bought by Waite Phillips in the 1920s, who was to donate 35,857 acres (145.11 km^{2}) to the Boy Scouts of America in 1938.
