= Mount Phillips (New Mexico) =

Mountain in New Mexico, United States

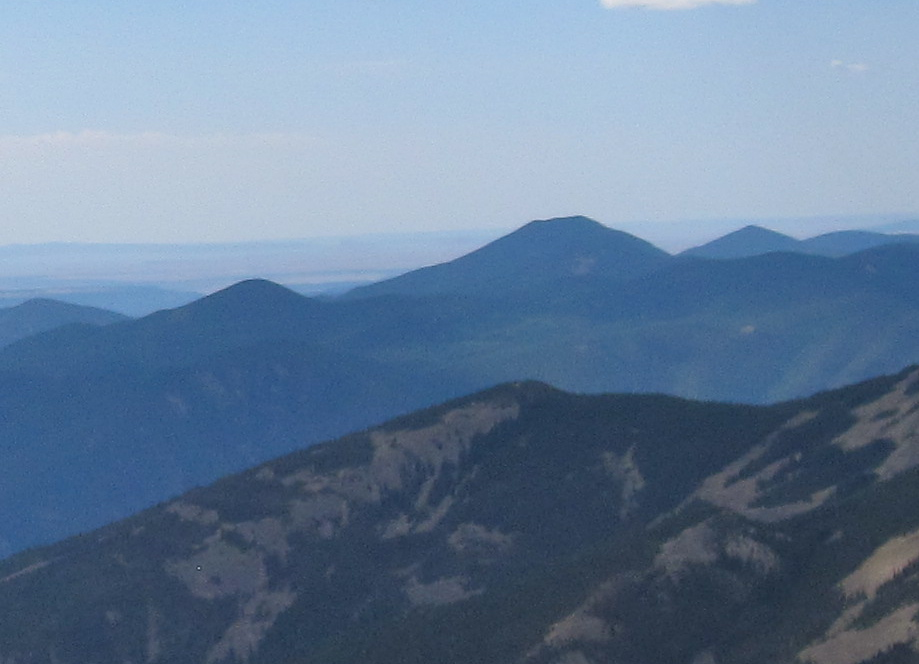
- Mount Phillips (tallest mountain, at center) seen from Baldy Mountain

Highest point
- Elevation: 11,742 ft (3,579 m) NAVD 88
- Prominence: 2,901 ft (884 m)
- Coordinates: 36°28′36″N 105°09′34″W

Geography
- Location within New Mexico
- Location: Colfax County, New Mexico, U.S.
- Parent range: Cimarron Range, Sangre de Cristo Mountains
- Topo map: USGS Garcia Peak (NM)

Mount Phillips, is a mountain located in Colfax County, New Mexico about 11 miles (18 km) south of Baldy Mountain in the Cimarron Range, a subrange of the Sangre de Cristo Mountains of New Mexico. Formerly called Clear Creek Mountain, it was renamed in 1960 in honor of the then living Waite Phillips, who donated the area to Scouting America as part of the Philmont Scout Ranch.

== Philmont Scout Ranch ==
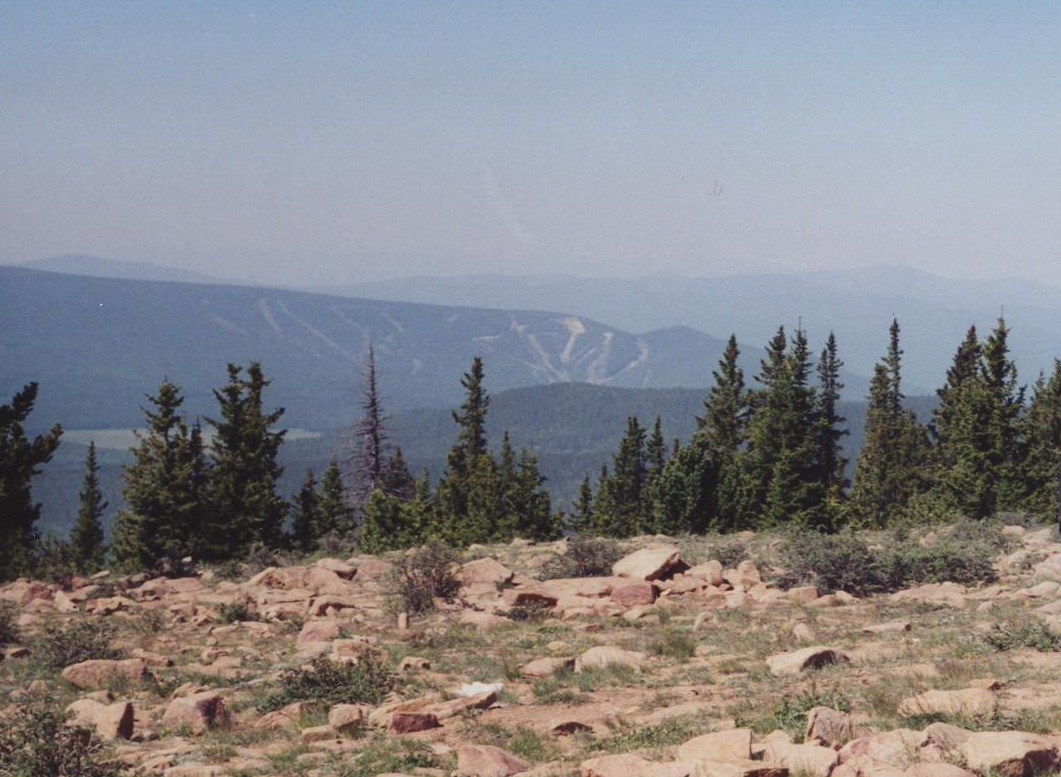
Mount Phillips view south from the southern false summit to Angel Fire Ski Area

Mount Phillips is the second highest peak in Scouting America's Philmont Scout Ranch. It is located in the central country on the western perimeter of the ranch. It is an moderate, rocky hike from Comanche Peak, a new trail from clear creek makes the ascent much easier with switchbacks to the 11,742 feet (3,579 m) summit. There are four close trail camps in the area of the summit, but none have water. These are Mount Phillips, Comanche Peak, Thunder Ridge and Red Hills Camps, which, except for Red Hills Camp, are all dry. The staff camp of Clear Creek is the closest camp with water.

== Geology ==
The mountain consists primarily of the metamorphic rock, pink gneiss, which is quite evident as small boulders on the trail. The true summit is marked with a flagpole toward the north side. A few crosses have sprung up in this area, having great meaning to the groups that have erected them. It is scarce of trees and gives great views to the north, east and west. This is not true for the south, due to the gentle incline of the terrain in this direction. From the southern false summit, a good view of Angel Fire Ski Area is possible

== See also ==
- Tooth of Time
- Cimarron Range
- Culebra Range
- Eagle Nest Dam
- Sangre de Cristo Mountains
- Geography and ecology of Philmont Scout Ranch
