= Cimarron Range, New Mexico =

Mountain range in New Mexico, US

Cimarron Range
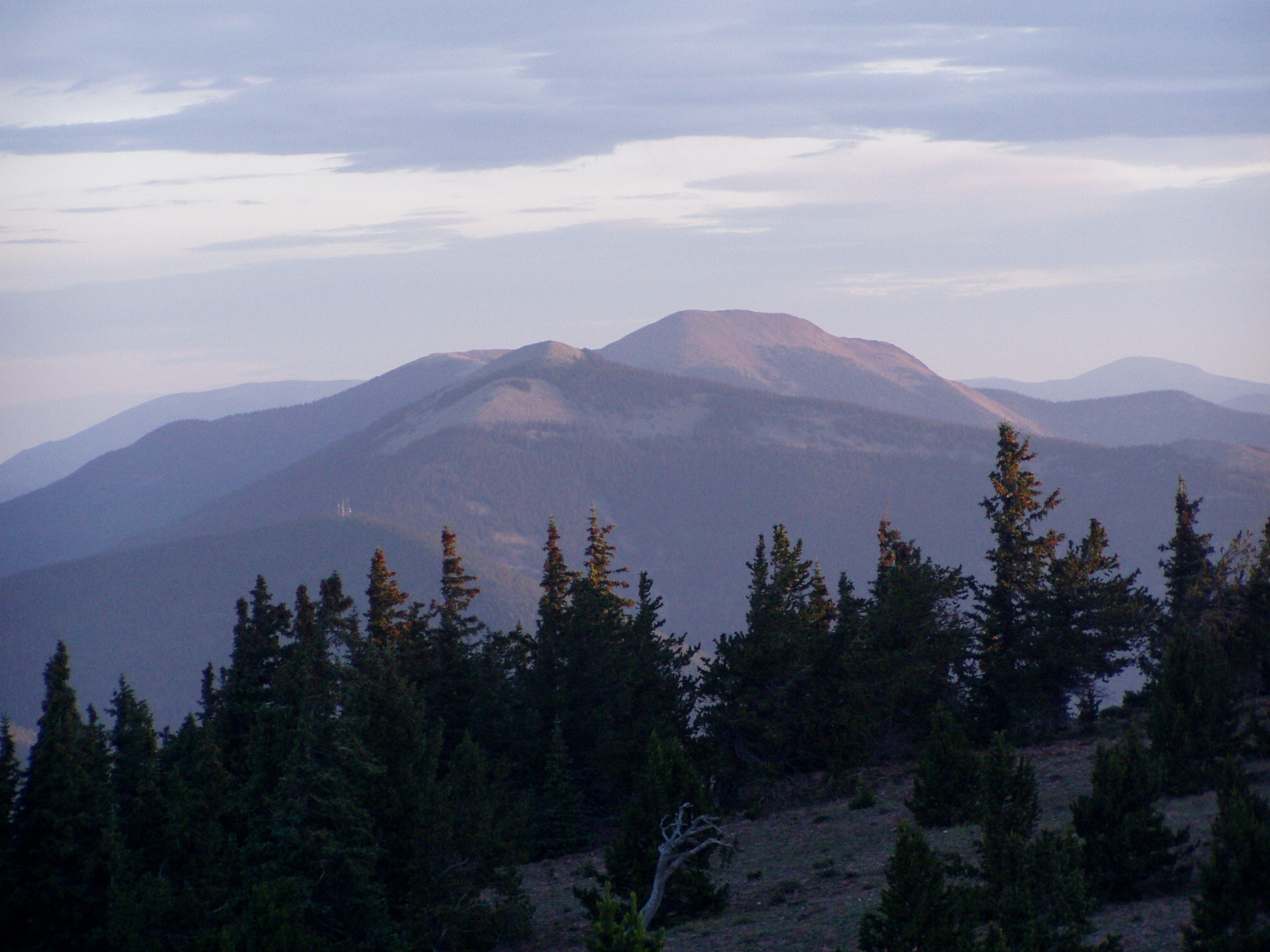
- Baldy Mountain from the peak of Mount Phillips

Highest point
- Peak: Baldy Mountain, 36.630°N 105.213°W
- Elevation: 12,441 ft (3,792 m)

Dimensions
- Length: 44 mi (71 km) NW

Geography
- Country: United States
- State: New Mexico

Geology
- Orogeny: Laramide

The Cimarron Range is a mountain range located mainly in Colfax County of northeastern New Mexico, United States. The range forms the eastern margin of the Southern Rocky Mountains in north-central New Mexico to the west of Cimarron, New Mexico. The range is about forty-seven miles (76 km) long and forty-four miles (71 km) wide and is bounded by the Moreno Valley to the west, the Great Plains to the east, the Raton Basin to the north, and Ocate Mesa to the south. The highest point is Baldy Mountain, 12,441 feet (3,792 m)

Large portions of the range are included in Philmont Scout Ranch.

== Geology ==
The range is a Laramide uplift defined by a normal fault on the west side and a thrust fault on the east side. The northern part of the uplift is covered by sedimentary beds of the easternmost Raton Basin, and the southern part of the uplift is covered with basalt flows of Ocate Mesa, so that the structure of the uplift is obscured to the north and south. The northern part of the range is intruded by large bodies of granitic rock of Tertiary age.

== See also ==
- List of mountain ranges of New Mexico
