= Norton Clapp =

American businessman (1906–1995)

Matthew Norton Clapp (April 15, 1906 – April 22, 1995) was an American businessman and philanthropist who served as chairman of the Weyerhaeuser Corporation.

== Early life and career ==
Clapp was born in Pasadena, California. He was named for his maternal grandfather Matthew G. Norton, a Winona, Minnesota lumberman who via the Laird, Norton Company was to help finance the Weyerhaeuser purchase of land in Washington State in 1900.

Clapp received an A.B. from Occidental College and a Ph.B in 1928 from the University of Chicago and a J.D. from Chicago in 1929.

He practiced law in Tacoma, Washington from 1929 until 1942. He was among the developers of Lakewood Colonial Center in 1937 in what is now Lakewood, WA. It was one of the first shopping centers west of the Mississippi River. In 1938, he converted an existing structure into the Lakewood Ice Arena. He became a trustee of the University of Puget Sound in 1933 and would serve there until his death including being chairman from 1967 until 1986.

In 1938 he began his career with Weyerhauser. He joined the United States Navy during World War II and served until 1946 when he returned to Weyerhauser. In 1947 he succeeded his father as a director of the company. He was its president from 1960 to 1966 and chairman until 1970.

== Civic service and community builder and investor ==
In 1949 he was a founder of the Medina Foundation, which provides charitable grants in the greater Puget Sound area.

He was named to the Trustees of University of Chicago in 1957 and was named a Life Trustee in 1970.

In 1961 he joined Bagley Wright, contractor Howard S. Wright, architect John Graham, and financier Ned Skinner as investors in the Pentagram Corporation which was to build and own the Space Needle for the 1962 World's Fair. He continued his ownership until 1977 when he sold out his interests to Howard Wright.

== Scouting ==
Clapp was a member of the National Executive Board of the Boy Scouts of America for several decades. In 1963 he donated the land around Mount Baldy, New Mexico to the Scouts, and this property was added to Philmont Scout Ranch. From 1971 to 1973, he served as national president of the BSA.

== Personal life ==
Clapp married several times and had many children, including three sons whom he outlived. His second wife Evelyn and stepdaughter Gail Gardner were killed in an airplane crash near Santa Barbara, California, in 1951. Evelyn's son Booth Gardner was the state's governor from 1985 to 1993, and Clapp contributed $91,000 to his first gubernatorial campaign.

He married his son Jim's ex-wife Jacquie in 1984. When he died at his Medina home on April 22, 1995, Clapp's fortune was estimated at $450 million by Forbes.

Boy Scouts of America
Preceded by Irving Feist	National president 1971–1973	Succeeded by Robert W. Reneker
