= Paulita Maxwell =

Friend of Billy the Kid (1864–1929)

Paulita Maxwell Jaramillo (born 17 May 1864, Mora, New Mexico; died 17 December 1929, Fort Sumner, New Mexico), was the daughter of wealthy rancher Lucien Maxwell and friend (and possible lover) of gunfighter Billy the Kid. She was in her brother Pete's house when Billy was killed there by Pat Garrett on 14 July 1881. She married José Felix Jaramillo on 14 January 1883. She was an informant of Walter Noble Burns and Miguel Antonio Otero for their books, The Saga of Billy the Kid (1927) and The Real Billy the Kid (1936).

== Early life ==
Paulita Maxwell was the daughter of Lucien Maxwell and Maria de la Luz Beaubien. The Maxwell and Beaubien families were intertwined as owners of the 1,700,000 acres (690,000 ha) Maxwell Land Grant in northern New Mexico. In 1870, Lucien Maxwell sold the grant and moved with his family to recently-closed Fort Sumner in southern New Mexico. The family occupied a large house which previously had been the officer's quarters at the fort. Lucien died in 1875. In the 1880 census, sixteen-year old Paulita was recorded as living in the house with her mother and "attending school." Others in the household were her brother Pete, age 28, her sister, Odile, age 10, and Navajo servant, Deluvina Maxwell, age 22.

== Paulita and Billy ==
Much ink has been expended to speculate about the relationship between Billy the Kid and Paulita Maxwell. Billy, it has been alleged, was in Fort Sumner because of his love for Paulita. The couples' plan to elope were ruined by Billy's death. Some sources have alleged that Paulita was pregnant with Billy's child at the time of his death and that a shotgun marriage was quickly arranged to José Felix Jaramillo. This story has been disproven by evidence that the marriage of Jaramillo and Paulita was eighteen months after Billy was killed. The speculation is that, because of the scandalous nature of the relationship between Paulita and Billy, the truth has been suppressed, especially by Paulita's older brother, Pete (aka Pedro).

Author Walter Noble Burns interviewed Paulita Jaramillo (married name) in 1923. Burns mentioned speaking with eight different people, all contemporaries of Billy the Kid and Paulita, who believed that a romance had existed between the couple. Paulita herself denied such a romance:

Billy the Kid and I were good friends and that is all...Billy the Kid fascinated many women and his record as a heartbreaker was as formidable as his record as a mankiller. He numbered his queridas [sweethearts] by the dozen...He had at various times three sweethearts in Fort Sumner. One of them, I am told, is now a respected matron in Las Vegas. Another had a daughter who lived to be eight years old, and whose striking resemblance to the famous outlaw filled the mother's heart with pride. The third and last was the lure that drew him to his death.

"The lure," cited by Paulita, that drew Billy the Kid to his death in Fort Sumner may have been Celsa Gutierrez, the sister-in-law of Billy's killer, Pat Garrett.

Paulita was asleep in the Maxwell house when Billy was killed about midnight on the night of 14/15 July 1881. She heard the shots, left her room, and found Pat Garrett, two other lawmen, and her brother Pete on the porch of the house. Told of Billy's death, she initially took the news calmly, but she broke down when she saw his body and had to be consoled by other women who arrived on the scene.

== Later life ==
On 14 January 1883, Paulita married José Felix Jaramillo, whose wealthy family owned a sheep ranch near Los Lunas, a few miles south of Albuquerque. She lived in Las Lunas with Jaramillo until 1900. The couple had three children. He was abusive and the couple separated. She moved back to Fort Sumner with her children and purchased and managed a hotel. In the 1920 census, she called herself a widow, but in fact her husband lived until 28 March 1937. The couple were never divorced. The fortunes of Fort Sumner declined in the 1920s and she was left almost penniless. She died on 17 December 1929 of influenza and pneumonia.
