= Geography and ecology of Philmont Scout Ranch =

Philmont Scout Ranch is located in the Sangre de Cristo Mountains of the Rocky Mountains of New Mexico. Philmont is about 12 miles (19 km) across (east to west) at its widest point, and about 30 miles (48 km) long (north to south). The southern part of the ranch is mostly grasslands/prairie, while the north is rocky and rugged, but a small part of the eastern area is prairie.

== Geography ==
Philmont's lowest point is the southeast corner at 6,500 feet (2,000 m) and the highest point is the peak of Baldy Mountain, located on the ranch's northwest boundary, at 12,441 feet (3,792 m).

The average rainfall at Philmont ranges from 14 inches (360 mm) around Base Camp to 30 inches (760 mm) in the backcountry. There are nine major watersheds at Philmont - the Rayado River, Urraca Creek, Cimarroncito Creek, Sawmill Creek, the Cimarron (La Flecha) River, Turkey Creek, Dean Canyon, the Ponil River, and Ute Creek.

=== Geological history ===
The Tooth of Time, as well as Baldy Mountain, Betty's Bra, Lover's Leap, Cathedral Rock, Hogback Ridge, and many of the ridges in the northwest of the ranch, is an igneous intrusion of dacite porphyry formed in the Paleogene Period of the Cenozoic Era some 22-40 million years ago. These intrusions were formed when magma from deep within the Earth rose through older rock layers and slowly cooled. Over many thousands of years, the older sedimentary rock eroded and left the harder igneous formation. The sedimentary rock, generally shale, acted as a mold for the intrusive magma, causing it to harden and cool where the sedimentary rock was strongest. The gold veins were discovered in between the dacite porphyry and shale.

The only documented Tyrannosaurus rex track in the world was discovered within the camp's boundaries in 1983 by Charles Pillmore, specifically in North Ponil Canyon by the Anasazi Trail Camp. It was formally identified in 1994.

=== Geological features ===
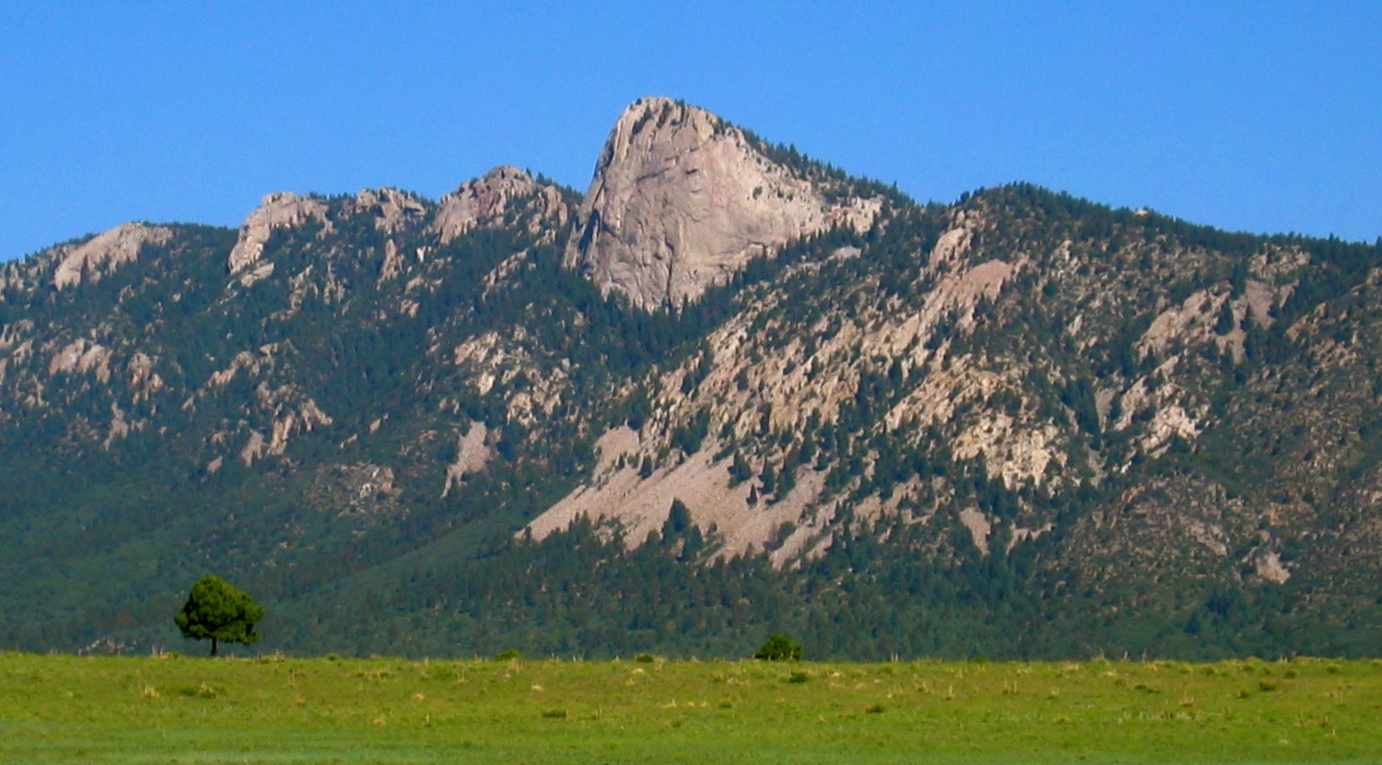
The Tooth of Time, an icon of Philmont Scout Ranch.

Aside from Baldy, the ranch contains a number of prominent peaks. The South Country is home to a series of six difficult peaks, namely Mount Phillips, Comanche Peak, Big Red, Bear Mountain, Black Mountain, and Schaefers Peak, as well as Trail Peak, which is popular for its relative ease, its nearness to Beaubien, and the wreckage of the crash of a B-24 bomber in 1942 near its summit. Of the ranch's various peaks with trail access, Black Mountain is widely considered the most difficult, followed closely by Baldy and Big Red.

The most recognisable landmark is the Tooth of Time at 9,003 feet (2,744 m), a dacite monolith, composed of two laccoliths, protruding 500 feet (150 m) vertically from an east–west ridge. Tooth of Time Ridge, and the latitude line on which it sits, mark the boundary between the central and southern sections of Philmont. The boundary between the central and northern sections is around U.S. Route 64, which runs just south of the narrowest part of the 'I'-shape, which is only a few miles across. Other prominent landmarks on the ranch include Grizzly Tooth, Window Rock, Deer Lake Mesa, and Urraca Mesa. The Tooth rises prominently from the valley floor, some 2,500 feet (760 m) below, creating a sheer vertical face unable to support substantial plant life. Both its pinkish-gray color and its unusual shape make it a particularly notable geological landmark. It was well known among the overland traders on the Santa Fe Trail, who used it to mark the final seven-day push to Santa Fe, New Mexico.

Baldy Mountain, or Mount Baldy, is the highest peak in the Cimarron Range, a subrange of the Sangre de Cristo Mountains of New Mexico. It rises abruptly, with 3,640 feet (1,110 m) of vertical relief over 3 miles (4.8 km), from the Moreno Valley to the west and has a total elevation of 12,441 feet (3,792 m). Copper and gold were mined in the area starting in 1866, and the top of Baldy Mountain was developed as the Mystic Lode copper mine. Mine workings and prospects are still evident on the slopes of the mountain as well. There are about 70 miles (110 km) of mines in the whole mountain.

Mount Phillips, formerly called Clear Creek Mountain was renamed in 1960 in honor of the then living Waite Phillips, who donated the area to the Boy Scouts of America. It is located in Colfax County about 11 miles (18 km) south of Baldy Mountain in the Cimarron Range, a subrange of the Sangre de Cristo Mountains of New Mexico. It is the second highest peak in Philmont Scout Ranch in the central country on the western perimeter. It is an easy hike from Comanche Peak, but it is a much steeper ascent from Clear Creek to its 11,741 feet (3,579 m) summit.

Urraca Mesa is a large mesa reaching an elevation of 8,583 feet (2,616 m) and has coordinates of N 36.413647 and W 104.998059. The mesa has a long "history" of mythical and supernatural associations, dating to the local indigenous tribes.

== Ecology ==
=== Flora and funga ===
Philmont supports a wide variety of flora. There are five of the Merriam life zones at Philmont - the Arctic, Hudsonian, Canadian, Transition, and Upper Sonoran zones. Trees at Philmont range from the plains cottonwood to the quaking aspen to the ponderosa pine. Wildflowers at Philmont include prickly poppy, shrubby cinquefoil, skyrocket (scarlet gilia), fairy slipper, blue columbine, and pinedrops. There are also a number of grasses, lichens, ferns, and mushrooms. Musk thistle, leafy spurge, and tamarisk are all invasive species found at Philmont.

In addition to the natural flora, Philmont grows alfalfa hay for livestock. There are 750 acres (3.0 km^{2}) irrigated for cropland and another 250 acres (1.0 km^{2}) for plant forage..

=== Fauna ===
There are approximately 125 black bears on the ranch. The bears spend most of the summer looking for food, mostly plants like grass, acorns, and berries but also grubs, small animals, and carrion. Philmont also has mountain lions which feed on the native elk, deer, porcupines, mice, skunk, and rabbits. Western diamondback rattlesnakes are also found in Philmont.
