= Tooth of Time =

Geological feature in New Mexico, US

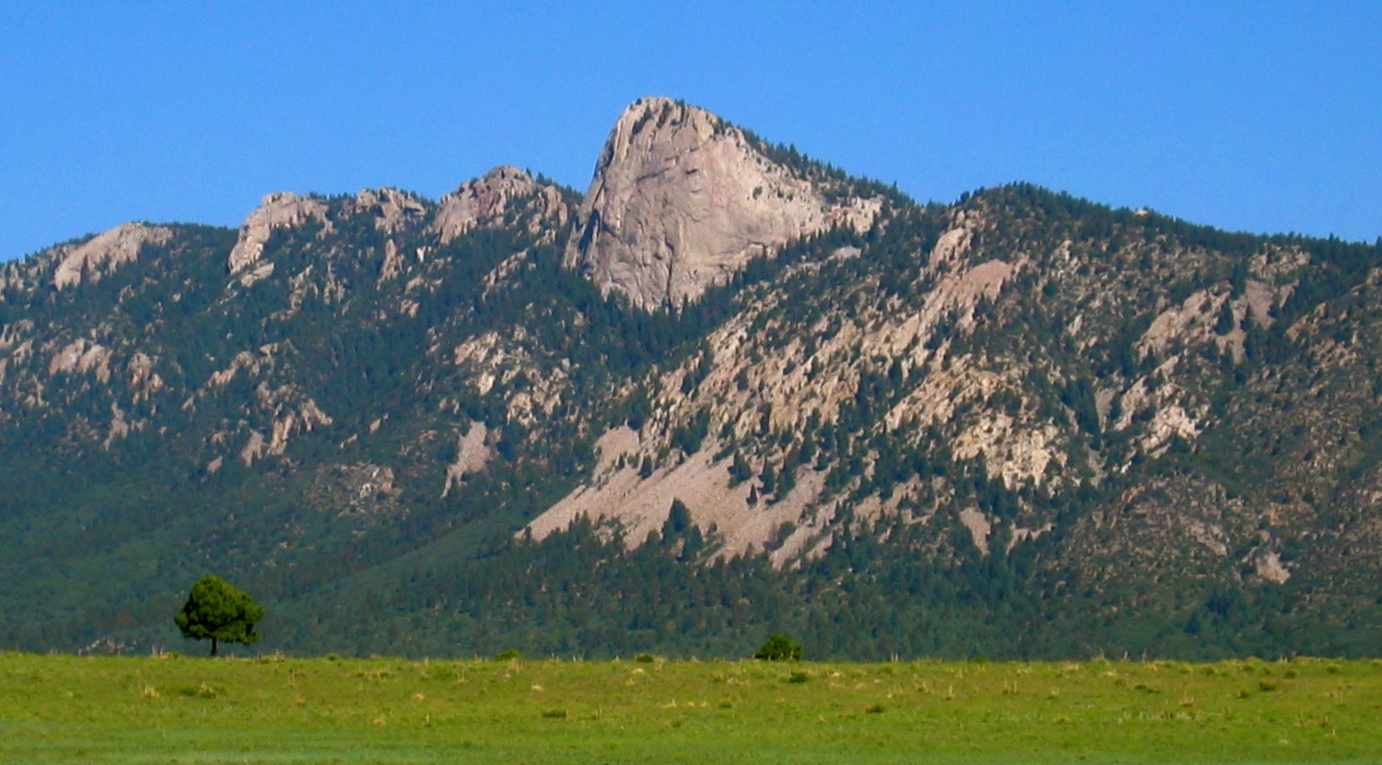
- Tooth of Time from the South

Highest point
- Elevation: 9,003 ft (2,744 m)
- Prominence: 203 ft (62 m)
- Coordinates: 36°26′53″N 105°0′29″W

Geography
- Location within New Mexico Location within the United States
- Location: Colfax County, New Mexico, US
- Parent range: Cimarron Range, Sangre de Cristo Mountains
- Topo map: USGS Tooth of Time

Climbing
- First ascent: antiquity
- Easiest route: Scramble

The Tooth of Time is a geological feature on the Philmont Scout Ranch located five miles (8.0 km) southwest of Cimarron, New Mexico, United States, and is one of Philmont's most popular sights. It is an igneous intrusion of dacite porphyry formed in the Paleogene Period of the Cenozoic Era some 22–40 million years ago.

== Santa Fe Trail ==
The Tooth rises prominently from the valley floor, some 2,500 feet (760 m) below, creating a sheer vertical face unable to support substantial plant life. Both its pinkish-gray color and its unusual shape make it a particularly notable geological landmark. It was well known among the overland traders on the Santa Fe Trail, who used it to mark the final seven-day push to Santa Fe, New Mexico.

== Geology ==
The Tooth was formed when magma from deep within the Earth rose through older rock layers and slowly cooled. Over many thousands of years, the older sedimentary rock eroded and left the harder igneous formation. The sedimentary rock acted as a mold for the intrusive magma, causing it to harden and cool where the sedimentary rock was strongest.

The Tooth sits atop a prominent ridge created through the process mentioned above.

== Climbing ==
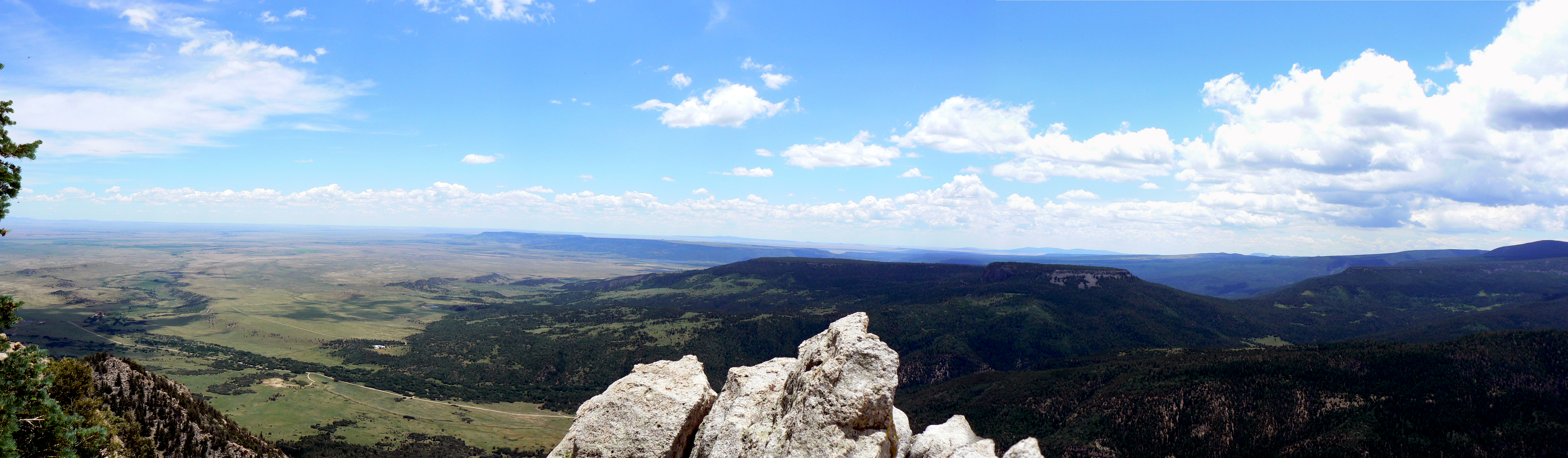
Panoramic view from top of the Tooth of Time.

The Tooth of Time is located on the east end of Tooth of Time Ridge, while Shaefer's Peak is located on the west end of the ridge. A trail extends about 3.5 miles from Shaefer's Pass to the Tooth Ridge campsite, located at the base of the Tooth of Time, with a short scramble ascending the Tooth. Another trail, known as the Stockade Trail, extends along the steeper back side and terminates at an animal stockade along a road. The first roped ascent of the main face was completed in July 1972 by Lee Davis, Rick Barrett, and Randy Wright.

== See also ==
- Baldy Mountain (Colfax County, New Mexico)
- Mount Phillips (New Mexico)
- Geography and ecology of Philmont Scout Ranch
