= Boy Scouts of America sexual abuse settlement (2022) =

$2.46B settlement for BSA abuse claims

- Court: United States Bankruptcy Court for the District of Delaware
- Decided: September 8, 2022 (approved by the bankruptcy court)
- Citation: Case No. 20-10343

Court membership
- Judge sitting: Laurie Selber Silverstein

Keywords
- Boy Scouts of America, sexual abuse, bankruptcy, class action settlement

The Boy Scouts of America sexual abuse settlement refers to a $2.46 billion agreement reached by the Boy Scouts of America (BSA) to compensate survivors of childhood sexual abuse within its programs. Stemming from a Chapter 11 bankruptcy filing in February 2020, the settlement addresses over 82,000 claims of sexual abuse by former Scouts against troop leaders and other individuals associated with the organization. Approved by U.S. Bankruptcy Judge Laurie Selber Silverstein on September 8, 2022, it is considered one of the largest sexual abuse settlements in U.S. history. The settlement has faced legal challenges, including appeals from a minority of survivors and insurers, but was upheld by various courts, allowing payments to begin in 2023.

As of the end of May 2025, over 50% of 58,126 matrix claims were determined, with $164 million paid to ~ 22,605 survivors, despite litigation delays.

== Background ==
The Boy Scouts of America, founded in 1910, has historically been one of the largest youth organizations in the United States, serving millions of young people through its scouting programs. Reports of sexual abuse within the organization date back decades, with internal records known as the "Perversion Files" documenting cases from the mid-20th century. These files, released by court order in 2012 following an Oregon lawsuit, revealed that the BSA had knowledge of abuse by troop leaders but often failed to report it to authorities.

In the late 2010s, several U.S. states enacted "lookback window" laws, allowing survivors to file lawsuits over decades-old abuse allegations regardless of statutes of limitations. This led to a surge of litigation, with the BSA facing over 275 lawsuits and 1,400 potential claims by early 2020. Unable to manage the financial burden, the BSA filed for Chapter 11 bankruptcy protection on February 18, 2020, in the United States Bankruptcy Court for the District of Delaware.

== Settlement process ==
The bankruptcy filing aimed to create a Victims Compensation Trust to equitably distribute funds to survivors while allowing the BSA to reorganize and continue operations. A deadline for filing claims was set for November 16, 2020, resulting in over 82,000 submissions. Initial negotiations produced an $850 million settlement in July 2021 with attorneys representing approximately 60,000 claimants supported by local councils and insurers.

The final settlement, approved in September 2022, increased to $2.46 billion, incorporating contributions from the BSA, its insurers, local councils, and chartered organizations such as churches. Over 86% of claimants voted in favor of the plan. The trust, administered by retired bankruptcy Judge Barbara J. Houser, began distributing payments in April 2023, with awards ranging from $3,500 to $2.7 million based on the abuse's severity, location, and documentation.

=== Claims matrix and scaling factors ===
The settlement employs a claims matrix and scaling factors, as outlined in the Trust Distribution Procedures (TDP), to evaluate and assign monetary values to over 82,000 unliquidated abuse claims within the trust. The claims matrix categorizes abuse into six tiers based on severity—ranging from "Anal or Vaginal Penetration by Adult Perpetrator" ($600,000 base, $2.7 million max) to "Sexual Abuse-No Touching" ($3,500 base, $8,500 max)—with base and maximum values adjusted by scaling factors. These factors, applied by the Settlement Trustee, account for aggravating circumstances (e.g., multiple perpetrators, up to a 2.0 increase) and mitigating factors (e.g., statute of limitations, down to 0), aiming to reflect fair compensation comparable to tort system outcomes. As of January 23, 2025, over 25% of the 58,000 matrix claims had been determined, with $70 million disbursed to approximately 12,300 survivors, though delays persist due to ongoing litigation.

Claims Matrix for BSA Sexual Abuse Settlement
Tier	Type of Abuse	Base Matrix Value	Maximum Matrix Value
1	Anal or Vaginal Penetration by Adult Perpetrator—includes anal or vaginal sexual intercourse, digital penetration, or penetration with a foreign object.	$600,000	$2,700,000
2	Oral Contact by Adult Perpetrator—includes mouth-to-genital or mouth-to-anus contact. Anal or Vaginal Penetration by a Youth Perpetrator—includes intercourse, digital penetration, or penetration with a foreign object.	$450,000	$2,025,000
3	Masturbation by Adult Perpetrator—includes genital touching involving masturbation. Oral Contact by a Youth Perpetrator—includes mouth-to-genital or mouth-to-anus contact.	$300,000	$1,350,000
4	Masturbation by Youth Perpetrator—includes genital touching involving masturbation. Touching of Sexual or Intimate Parts (unclothed) by Adult Perpetrator.	$150,000	$675,000
5	Touching of Sexual or Intimate Parts (unclothed) by a Youth Perpetrator. Touching of Sexual or Intimate Parts (clothed), regardless of who touches whom, not including masturbation. Exploitation for child pornography.	$75,000	$337,500
6	Sexual Abuse-No Touching. Adult Abuse Claims.	$3,500	$8,500

=== Status ===
==== As of June 2025 ====
In June 2025, the case had seen the estimated cost of compensating survivors rise to over $7 billion, doubling the BSA's initial projections of up to $3.6 billion. The trust, including contributions from some insurers, has processed less than half of the roughly 60,000 claims, with tens of thousands still under review.

The trust has billed non-settling insurers an additional $7 billion, though these insurers dispute the claims and have not paid, increasing the likelihood that survivors will not receive full compensation. The trust's website indicates that payouts will likely be less than 100% of the valued claims, which are assessed based on factors such as abuse severity and location.

Previous estimates of the BSA's liability varied widely, ranging from $2.4 billion to $103 billion. An appeals court largely upheld the bankruptcy plan in May 2025, but some survivors' attorneys, critical of the plan's adequacy, are considering a U.S. Supreme Court appeal. Litigation against approximately 90 insurers could extend for years if settlements are not reached.

==== As of November 2025 ====
By November 26, 2025, the Trust had determined approximately 75% of the 58,082 Matrix claims submitted by survivors, with delays due to ongoing fraud investigations and incomplete information in late-filed claims that required additional requests.

Under the Independent Review Option, 198 survivors elected review by neutral retired judges, with 188 hearings concluded or waived, resulting in 141 settlement recommendations, of which 129 were reviewed (127 accepted, one rejected, and one dismissed due to a prior settlement).

The Expedited Distribution process neared completion, with 6,027 claimants opting for $3,500 payments, resulting in over 5,293 fully paid and others in lien resolution.

Overall, the Trust disbursed more than $295.5 million to 36,896 survivors across all processes.

Asset liquidation progressed, yielding over $14 million from art auctions, with more planned through 2027; nearly $28.8 million from 48 sold Local Council properties; $15.2 million from eight under contract; ongoing revenue from oil and gas interests averaging $600,000 monthly; and timely payments on notes from the BSA, up to $80 million, and the Delaware Statutory Trust, up to $121 million.

Approximately $1.65 billion in escrowed funds from settling insurers awaited release pending a final Confirmation Order, delayed by an October 2025 petition to the U.S. Supreme Court for review of the Third Circuit's upholding of the BSA Plan, with a decision expected in mid-January 2026.

Litigation against non-settling insurers continued in federal court and was unlikely to reach trial for at least 24 months, while initial distributions remained at 1.5% of allowed claims, with second distributions planned post-escrow release.

==== January 2026 U.S. Supreme Court ruling ====
On January 12, 2026, the U.S. Supreme Court declined to hear a challenge by 75 sexual abuse survivors to the settlement, denying certiorari and leaving the reorganization plan intact. The challengers had contested the plan's third-party releases, which granted immunity to non-debtor sponsoring organizations, such as churches, in exchange for their contributions to the settlement fund, preventing survivors from pursuing separate claims against those entities. Approved by the Delaware bankruptcy court in September 2022, the settlement had already been upheld by lower courts, including the Third Circuit in May 2025, and survived an earlier emergency stay request to the Supreme Court in 2024.

The decision allows the settlement to access $1.65 billion in escrowed insurer funds and continue paying claims, with approximately $295.5 million already disbursed to over 36,000 survivors as of late 2025; supporters, including counsel for more than 9,500 survivors, hailed the ruling as removing final jeopardy from the plan, while Scouting America noted it enables ongoing survivor compensation and organizational reforms. This resolves the last major appellate challenge stemming from the organization's 2020 Chapter 11 filing, prompted by a surge in claims following extensions of state statutes of limitations for childhood sexual abuse.

==== Future claims and healthcare liens ====
In February 2026, the supplemental distribution to survivors was delayed due to two issues. First, a dispute arose between the Trustee and the Future Claims Representative (FCR) over the reserve amount for "Future Claims". These would be claims by minors abused before the BSA's bankruptcy filing who were not required to file proofs of claim. The Settlement Trust Advisory Committee (STAC) consented to the proposed distribution amount, but the FCR objected, arguing for a larger reserve; if unresolved through negotiation, the matter would be decided by the Bankruptcy Court. Second, survivors were required to indicate their preferred method for resolving potential healthcare liens against their recoveries, either through the Trust's Lien Resolution Administrator or independently. The Trust prepared forms and a guide for this purpose, and distributions could not proceed for individual claimants until both the FCR dispute was resolved and the required lien resolution documentation was submitted and reviewed.

== Differences in state jurisdictions ==
Differences in state jurisdictions significantly shaped the BSA sexual abuse settlement, particularly through varying statutes of limitations and "lookback window" laws that enabled survivors to file claims decades after the abuse occurred. States like New York and California, with expansive lookback periods enacted in 2019, saw a surge in lawsuits—New York alone accounted for over 2,000 claims—prompting the BSA's 2020 bankruptcy filing to consolidate cases nationally. In contrast, states with stricter limitations, such as Alabama, restricted claims unless filed within a shorter timeframe, reducing survivor participation from those regions. These jurisdictional disparities influenced the settlement's tiered payout structure, with awards partly based on the state where the abuse occurred, reflecting local legal climates and reporting requirements.

== Legal challenges ==
The settlement faced opposition from a minority of stakeholders. Approximately 144 survivors argued that it unlawfully shielded non-bankrupt entities—such as local councils and churches—from future lawsuits, a legal mechanism similar to one under review in the Purdue Pharma bankruptcy case. Some insurers also appealed, claiming the BSA shifted liability unfairly.

In February 2024, the U.S. Supreme Court declined an emergency request to halt the settlement, allowing payments to proceed while it considered the Purdue case. On November 6, 2024, a 3rd U.S. Circuit Court of Appeals panel signaled reluctance to overturn the deal, citing the impracticality of undoing a finalized settlement.

== Sale of Boy Scout assets ==
The BSA, facing financial pressure in the settlement, has sold various assets to fund the Victims Compensation Trust, including camps, art, land, and leases. Local councils, required to contribute at least $515 million, have divested numerous properties, such as the 252-acre Deer Lake camp in Connecticut and the 95-acre Camp Gustin in Maine, with some sold to developers and others preserved by conservation groups. The national organization also planned to sell its collection of over 50 Norman Rockwell paintings, valued as part of its $1 billion in assets, to bolster the settlement fund, though specific sales outcomes remain unreported.

== Insurance and reinsurance involvement ==
Insurance and reinsurance companies played a significant role in funding the settlement, contributing a substantial portion alongside the BSA, local councils, and chartered organizations. By December 2021, insurers like The Hartford had agreed to pay $800 million into the Victims Compensation Trust, with additional insurance rights potentially worth over $4 billion assigned to the fund. However, a minority of insurers, including Liberty Mutual, resisted the settlement, arguing it unfairly imposed liability for "invalid and questionable claims." On March 31, 2023, these insurers sought to delay the BSA's bankruptcy exit to appeal the plan. Still, U.S. District Judge Richard Andrews rejected their initial challenge, affirming the settlement's good faith. While this effort temporarily stalled progress, the Supreme Court's February 2024 decision to lift a prior pause allowed payments to resume, indicating that insurer objections ultimately did not derail the settlement's implementation.

== Church and faith organization involvement ==
Church and faith organizations, as major chartering partners of the BSA, were significantly involved in the settlement due to their historical oversight of local troops where the abuse occurred. The United Methodist Church, chartering around 5,000 BSA units, contributed $30 million to the Victims Compensation Trust under a December 2021 agreement, reflecting its extensive involvement with scouting. The Church of Jesus Christ of Latter-day Saints (LDS Church), once the largest sponsor with over 400,000 Scouts, initially offered $250 million, but Judge Laurie Selber Silverstein rejected this in July 2022 due to unresolved insurance disputes; a revised contribution was later negotiated. Other groups, such as Catholic parishes and Presbyterian churches, also participated, with over 40% of the BSA's 250 local councils tied to faith-based sponsors contributing assets or funds to the trust. These organizations benefited from third-party releases in the settlement, shielding them from future lawsuits, a provision upheld despite objections from some survivors.

== Impact on affected people ==
The settlement has profoundly affected the over 82,000 survivors who filed claims. For many, it provided financial compensation after decades of silence, with initial payments to 7,000 "quick pay" claimants (opting for $3,500) beginning in September 2023. By early 2024, the trust had disbursed nearly $8 million to over 3,000 claimants. Survivors have described the process as emotionally taxing, requiring detailed recounting of their abuse for evaluation, often reopening old wounds.

The settlement also aimed to ensure accountability and reform within the BSA. Survivors' participation in the bankruptcy process led to the implementation of enhanced safety protocols, including mandatory background checks and youth protection training. However, critics among the survivors, including the 144 appellants, expressed frustration that the deal limited their ability to pursue justice against non-bankrupt entities, potentially leaving some perpetrators and enablers unaccountable.

The settlement preserved the BSA's operations for the broader scouting community, allowing it to continue serving over one million youth, though the scandal has impacted its reputation and membership.

=== Legal costs to individuals ===
The BSA sexual abuse settlement imposed various legal costs on individual claimants, primarily the over 82,000 survivors who filed claims. While the $2.46 billion Victims Compensation Trust covered payouts, survivors incurred indirect costs during the claims process. Many hired private attorneys to navigate the bankruptcy proceedings, with contingency fees typically ranging from 33% to 40% of their settlement awards, reducing their net compensation. For example, claimants opting for the $3,500 "quick pay" option retained approximately $2,100 to $2,450 after fees, depending on their legal agreements.

The claims process required survivors to submit detailed documentation, often necessitating professional assistance to compile affidavits or medical records. Some reported spending hundreds of dollars on administrative costs, such as obtaining historical evidence or psychological evaluations to substantiate their claims. A subset of survivors, particularly the 144 who appealed the settlement, faced additional expenses. Their legal challenge, which reached the U.S. Supreme Court in 2024, involved costs for filings and representation, though specific figures remain undisclosed. Attorneys for these appellants, such as Gilion Dumas representing 67 claimants, noted the financial burden increased as appeals prolonged the process.

Costs were higher for individuals who pursued separate lawsuits before the bankruptcy filing. Between 2017 and 2019, the BSA settled over 275 cases, with some survivors funding their litigation. Legal experts estimate that such lawsuits could cost individuals thousands of dollars in attorney fees and court expenses, especially if cases went to trial. The settlement's structure, which shielded non-bankrupt entities like local councils and churches, limited survivors' ability to recover these costs through further litigation, leaving many to absorb them personally.

The emotional and time-related costs also affected individuals. Survivors described the claims process as retraumatizing, requiring significant personal investment to recount abuse details, though these are not quantifiable in monetary terms. Overall, while the trust aimed to centralize compensation, individual legal costs varied widely based on claimants' circumstances and choices.

== See also ==
- Catholic Church sexual abuse cases
- Child sexual abuse
- Chapter 11 bankruptcy
- Purdue Pharma
