= Charles H. Beaubien =

American rancher

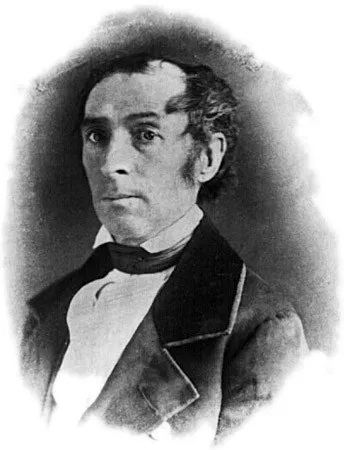
- Born: Alexis Beaubien; October 22, 1800; Nicolet, Quebec
- Died: February 6, 1864 (aged 63); Taos, New Mexico
- Other names: Carlos Beaubien, Charles Trotier
- Occupation: Fur trader
- Known for: Beaubien-Miranda Land Grant

Charles H. Beaubien (October 22, 1800 – February 6, 1864), also known as Alexis Beaubien, Don Carlos Beaubien and Charles Trotier, was a Canadian-born American fur trader who was one of two investors who owned 2,700,000 acres (11,000 km^{2}) of northeastern New Mexico and southeastern Colorado in the Beaubien-Miranda and Sangre de Cristo Land Grants. He served for a time on the New Mexico Territorial Supreme Court.

== Early life ==
Beaubien was born in Saint-Jean-Baptiste de Nicolet, Quebec. His birth name was Alexis Beaubien (Sieur de Beaubien is a title, his birth surname is most likely Trotier).

He studied for the priesthood, and was tonsured in 1820. When he dropped out of the priesthood he changed his name to "Charles" in 1820 and moved to the United States (probably at St. Louis, Missouri where he worked in the fur business with the Chouteau family). There are numerous stories about how he moved west. He was licensed by William Clark to enter Indian Territory in NM on December 29, 1823.

From another New Mexico History we have that Charles Hipolyte Trotier, Sieur de Beaubien, left Canada for the United States during the War of 1812, and came to New Mexico in 1823, in company with a number of French Canadians who were making investigations in New Mexico.

Beaubien went beyond the Territory controlled by the United States and moved into territory controlled by Mexico and eventually settled at Taos, New Mexico where he applied to become a citizen of Mexico. As it was the custom for administrators, notaries and scriveners to translate Christian names, his name was recorded as "Carlos" instead of "Charles," and so he often appears as Carlos Beaubien in New Mexico records.

In 1827 he married Maria Paula Lobato in Taos in a ceremony conducted by Antonio José Martínez who would later become his nemesis. He started a business in Taos.

== Beaubien-Miranda Land Grant ==
In 1840 New Mexico Governor Manuel Armijo imposed a tax on non-native residents in New Mexico and Beaubien's businesses were regularly raided.

Beaubien, hoping to open businesses away from direct Mexican control, enlisted Guadalupe Miranda, the secretary of the government, to petition for a grant of 1,700,000 acres (6,900 km^{2}) on the eastern side of the Sangre de Cristo Mountains. Armijo approved the grant on January 4, 1841 with the provision that the land be settled within two years.

Settlement was delayed by incursions from Texans. In 1843, Beaubien and Miranda signed away one-fourth of their grant to Charles Bent in exchange for help in establishing ranches along the Ponil, Vermejo, Cimarron and Rayado rivers. The grant area became better known as the Maxwell Land Grant after Beaubien's son-in-law, Lucien Maxwell.

== Sangre de Cristo Land Grant ==
Later in 1843 Beaubien applied for a 1,000,000-acre (4,000 km^{2}) grant in the San Luis Valley east of the Rio Grande and extending to the summits of the Sangre de Cristo Mountains in southern Colorado. As he already had one grant, the Sangre de Cristo Land Grant went to his 13-year-old son Narciso and a Taos business associate Stephen Louis Lee. Armijo approved the grant on January 12, 1844.

Settlement was delayed by the Mexican–American War in 1846 which changed the political landscape. When Stephen W. Kearney set up government in Santa Fe, New Mexico in 1846 and established Charles Bent as governor. Beaubien was named one of the judges on the New Mexico Territorial Supreme Court. The Treaty of Guadalupe Hidalgo that ended the war affirmed the legality of Beaubien's grant. Settlement along the Rio Culebra began in 1850. Hispanic settlers from New Mexico founded the town of San Luis in 1851. San Luis was the first permanent settlement in Colorado.

== Taos Revolt ==
Beaubien was holding court in Tierra Amarilla, New Mexico when the Taos Revolt erupted in January 1847. In the revolt, Beaubien's son Narciso (freshly arriving from school in Cape Girardeau, Missouri), his partner Stephen Louis Lee, and Governor Bent were killed.

After Sterling Price put down the rebellion, Beaubien was the judge to overseeing the trial of his son's murderers prompting Father Martinez to accuse him of "endeavoring to kill all the people of Taos."

Beaubien turned to his sons-in-law Lucien Maxwell and Jesus Abreu to develop the land grant.

In 1851 he semi-retired from public service.

In 1863 he sold the Colorado land grant to territorial Colorado Governor William Gilpin for approximately four cents an acre ($41,000).
