= Baldy Mountain (Colfax County, New Mexico) =

Mountain peak in New Mexico, US

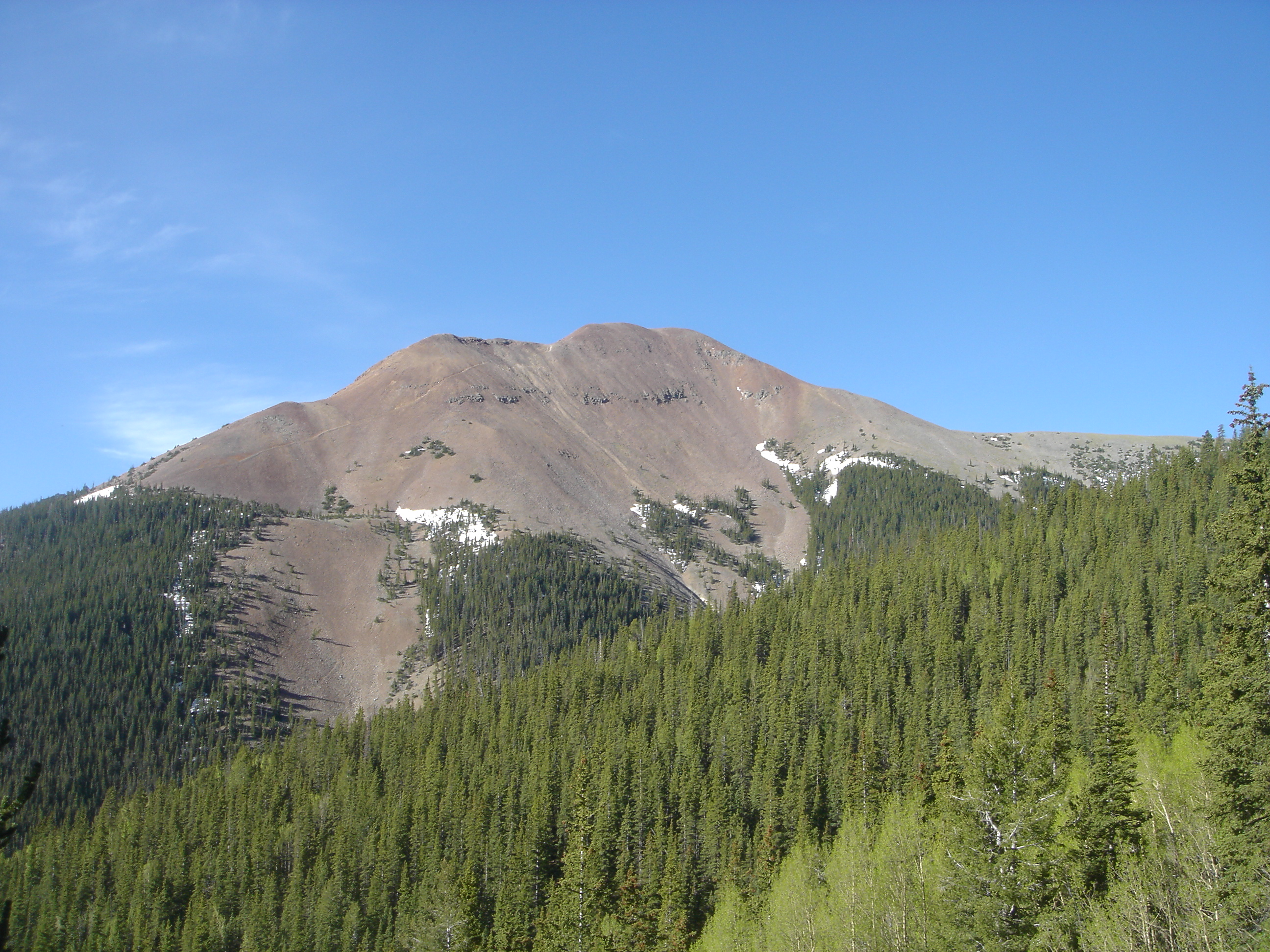
- Baldy Mountain from Copper Park camp

Highest point
- Elevation: 12,441 ft (3,792 m) NAVD 88
- Prominence: 2,681 ft (817 m)
- Coordinates: 36°37′48″N 105°12′48″W

Geography
- Location within New Mexico
- Location: Colfax County, New Mexico, U.S.
- Parent range: Cimarron Range, Sangre de Cristo Mountains
- Topo map: USGS Baldy Mountain

Baldy Mountain (official name), Baldy Peak, Mount Baldy, or Old Baldy is the highest peak in the Cimarron Range, a subrange of the Sangre de Cristo Mountains of New Mexico. It is located in Colfax County, about 6 miles (10 km) northeast of Eagle Nest. It rises abruptly, with 3,640 feet (1,110 m) of vertical relief (in 3 miles/4.8 km), from the Moreno Valley to the west and has a total elevation of 12,441 feet (3,792 m).

== Philmont Scout Ranch ==
Baldy Mountain lies on the northwestern border of the Scouting America's Philmont Scout Ranch. The valleys on the eastern side of the peak are home to some of the many small camps that are scattered throughout the Ranch. Four wheel drive roads and a radio tower exist high on the western slopes. In 1963 Norton Clapp bought 10,098 acres (4,087 ha) around the mountain and donated it to the Scouting America.

== Mining ==
Copper, gold, and silver were mined in the Baldy Mining District starting in 1866, and the top of Baldy Mountain was developed as the Mystic Lode copper mine. Other mines near Baldy Mountain were the Aztec, French Henry mine, Bull-of-the-Woods, Homestake, Black Horse, and Montezuma mines. Mine workings and prospects are still evident on the slopes of the mountain as well. There are about 70 miles (110 km) of mines in the whole mountain.

=== Baldy Town ===
On the east side of Baldy Mountain, a small town grew up around the mining operations from 1868 to 1941. Baldy Town has since been incorporated as a staff camp at Philmont Scout Ranch.

== Gallery ==
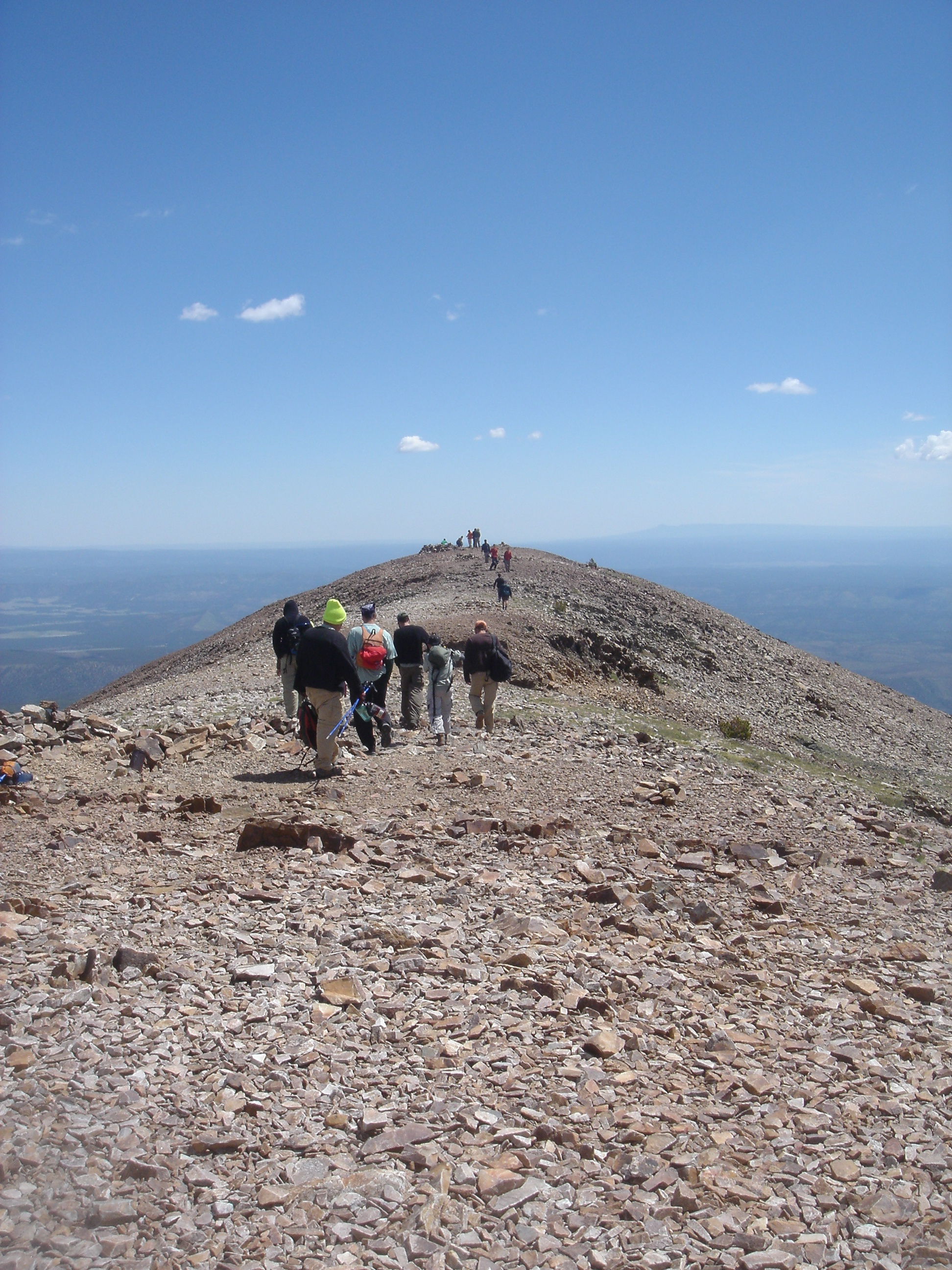
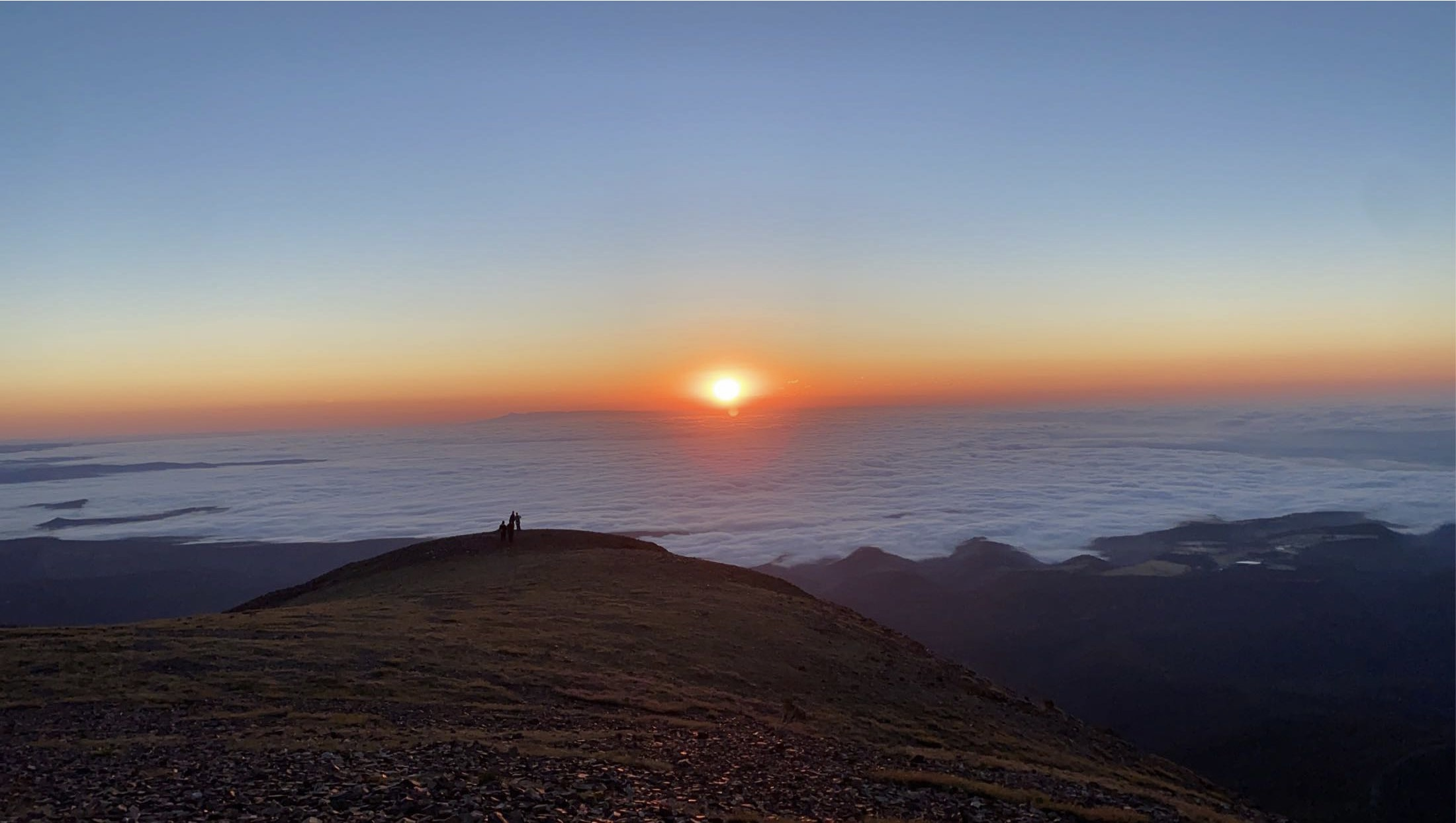
Sunrise from Baldy Summit
Baldy Summit Ridge

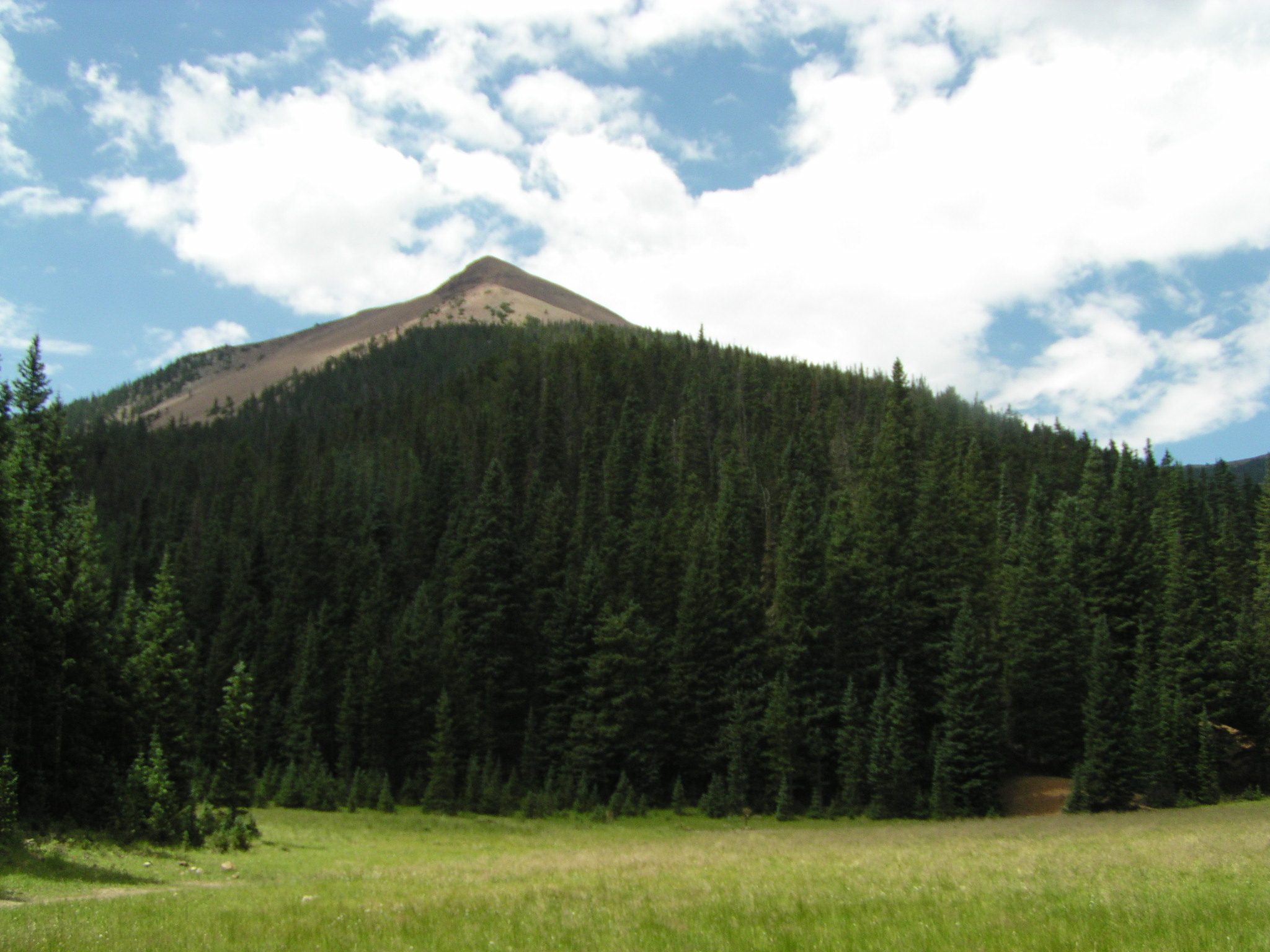
Baldy Mountain from Copper Park, Philmont Scout Ranch

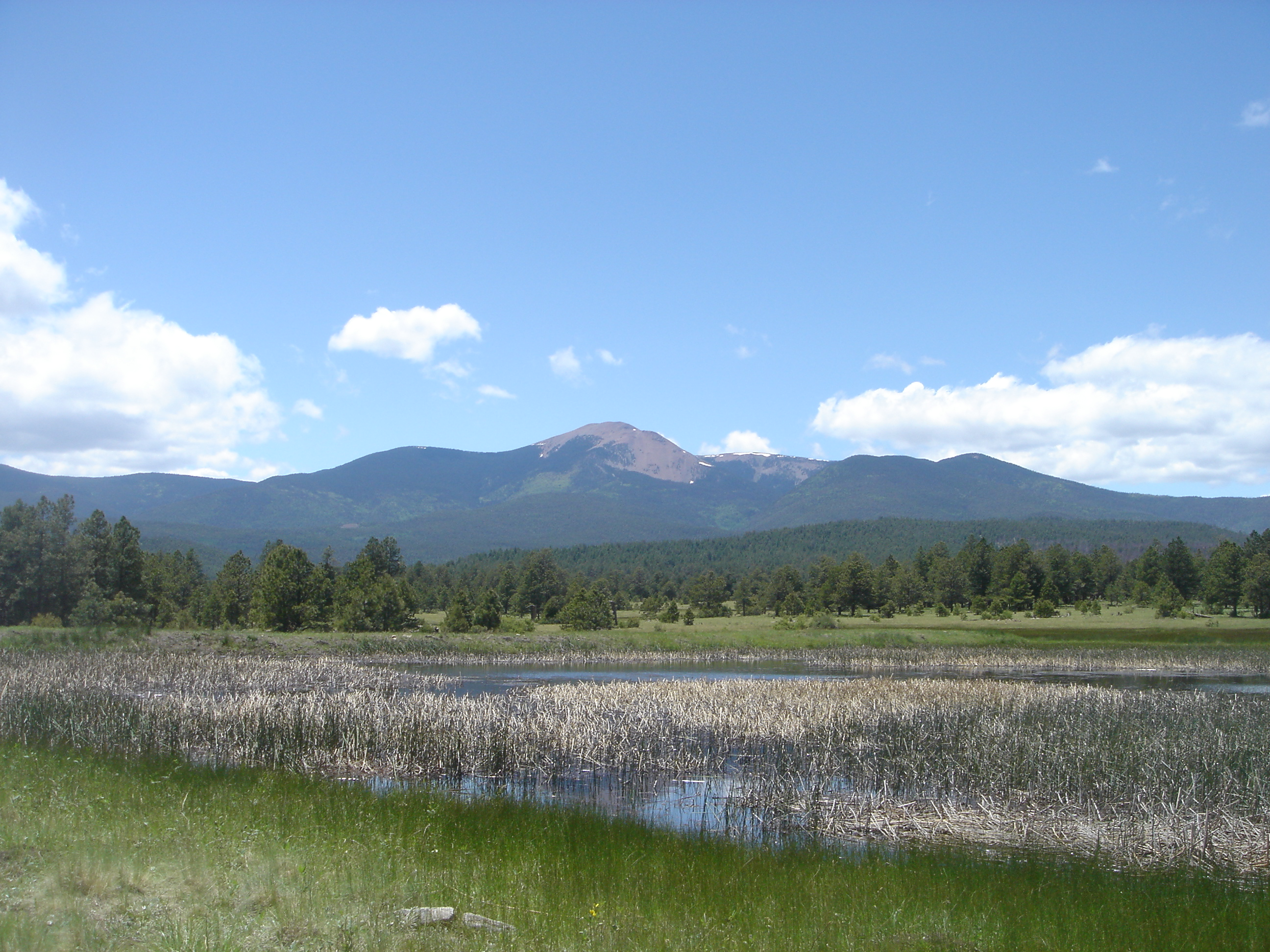
Baldy Mountain from Wilson Mesa

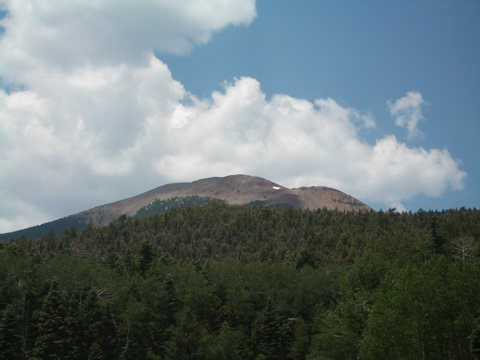
Viewing the southern face of Mount Baldy

== See also ==
- Baldy Town
- Tooth of Time
- Mount Phillips (New Mexico)
- List of peaks named Baldy
- Cimarron Range
- Culebra Range
- 4000 meter peaks of the United States
- Geography and ecology of Philmont Scout Ranch
