= Villa Philmonte =

- Villa Philmonte Historic District
- U.S. National Register of Historic Places
- U.S. Historic district
- NM State Register of Cultural Properties
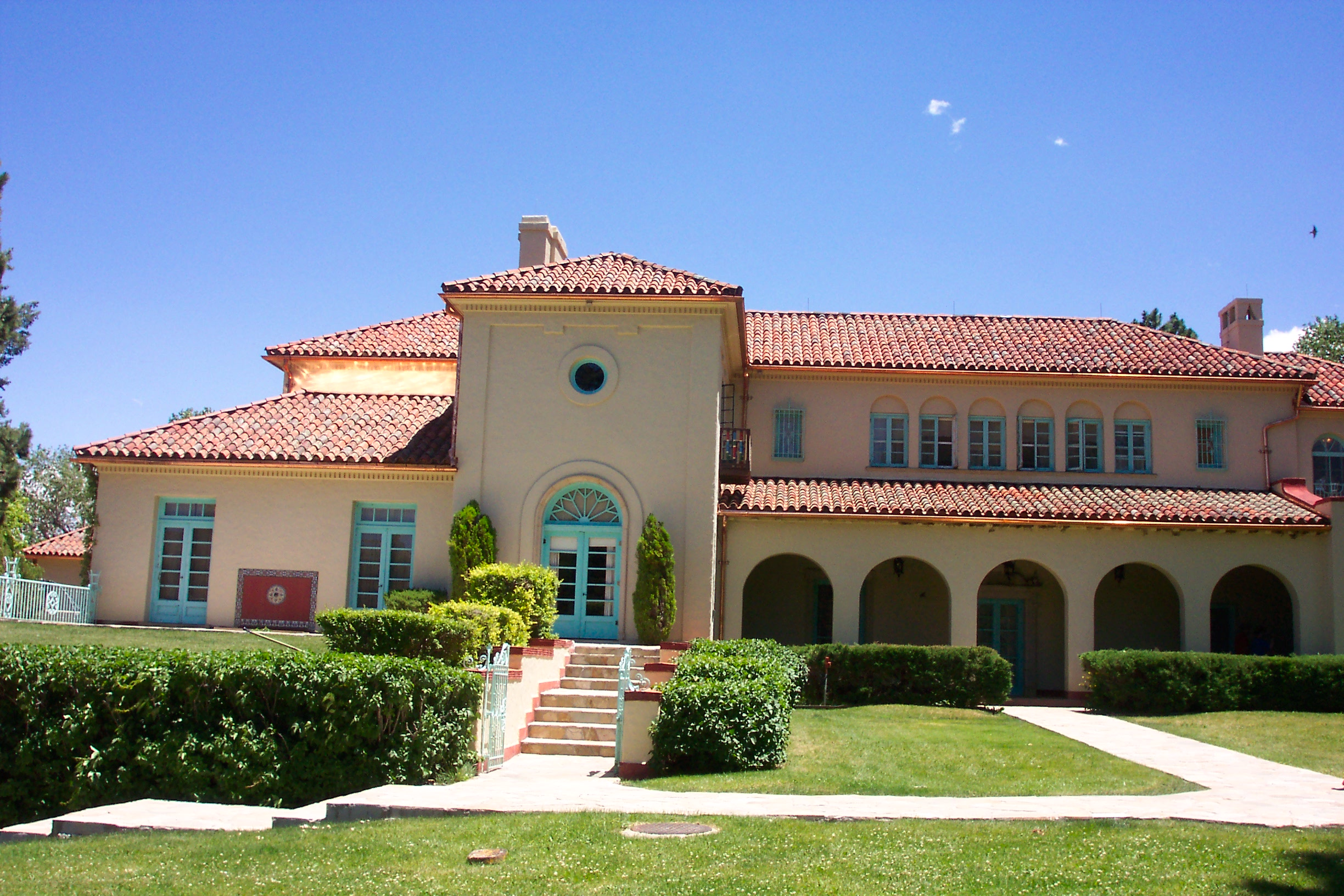
- The façade of the Villa Philmonte

- Location within New Mexico
- Nearest city: Cimarron, New Mexico
- Coordinates: 36°27′33″N 104°56′56″W
- Area: 2 acres (0.81 ha)
- Built: 1926
- Architect: Edward Buehler Delk
- Architectural style: Mission / Spanish Revival
- NRHP reference No.: 95001018
- NMSRCP No.: 1611

Significant dates
- Added to NRHP: August 18, 1995
- Designated NMSRCP: June 2, 1995

The Villa Philmonte is a large ranch home located outside of Cimarron, New Mexico, on Philmont Scout Ranch, owned by the Boy Scouts of America. It was listed on the National Register of Historic Places in 1995 as part of Villa Philmonte Historic District, which included two contributing buildings, two contributing structures, and two contributing sites. Those resources are the Villa Philmonte, an associated guesthouse, two courtyards, and a pool, pergola and pond.

== Background ==
The Villa was built in 1926 by oil magnate Waite Phillips who used it to oversee his 300,000 acres (120,000 ha) cattle ranch in northeast New Mexico. The house was built in the then-popular Mediterranean Revival style. The house was coated by layers of plaster over the years giving it an adobe-like appearance. Phillips named the house by combining the first half of his name with monte, the Spanish word for mountain. In addition to the Villa, Phillips built several other retreats on his ranch's property, including Fish Camp on the Agua Fria Creek and Hunting Lodge near Cimarroncito (now Philmont Scout Ranch camps).

Phillips donated the Villa, along with 91,538 acres (37,044 ha) of land and the Philtower office building in Tulsa, Oklahoma, to the Boy Scouts in 1941, supplementing a 1938 gift of 35,857 acres (14,511 ha) that had created the Philturn Rocky Mountain Scout camp, near Cimarron, New Mexico. The Boy Scouts of America has operated the property since that time and has opened the Villa to Scouts and visitors as a museum. Regularly scheduled tours are offered during the summer.

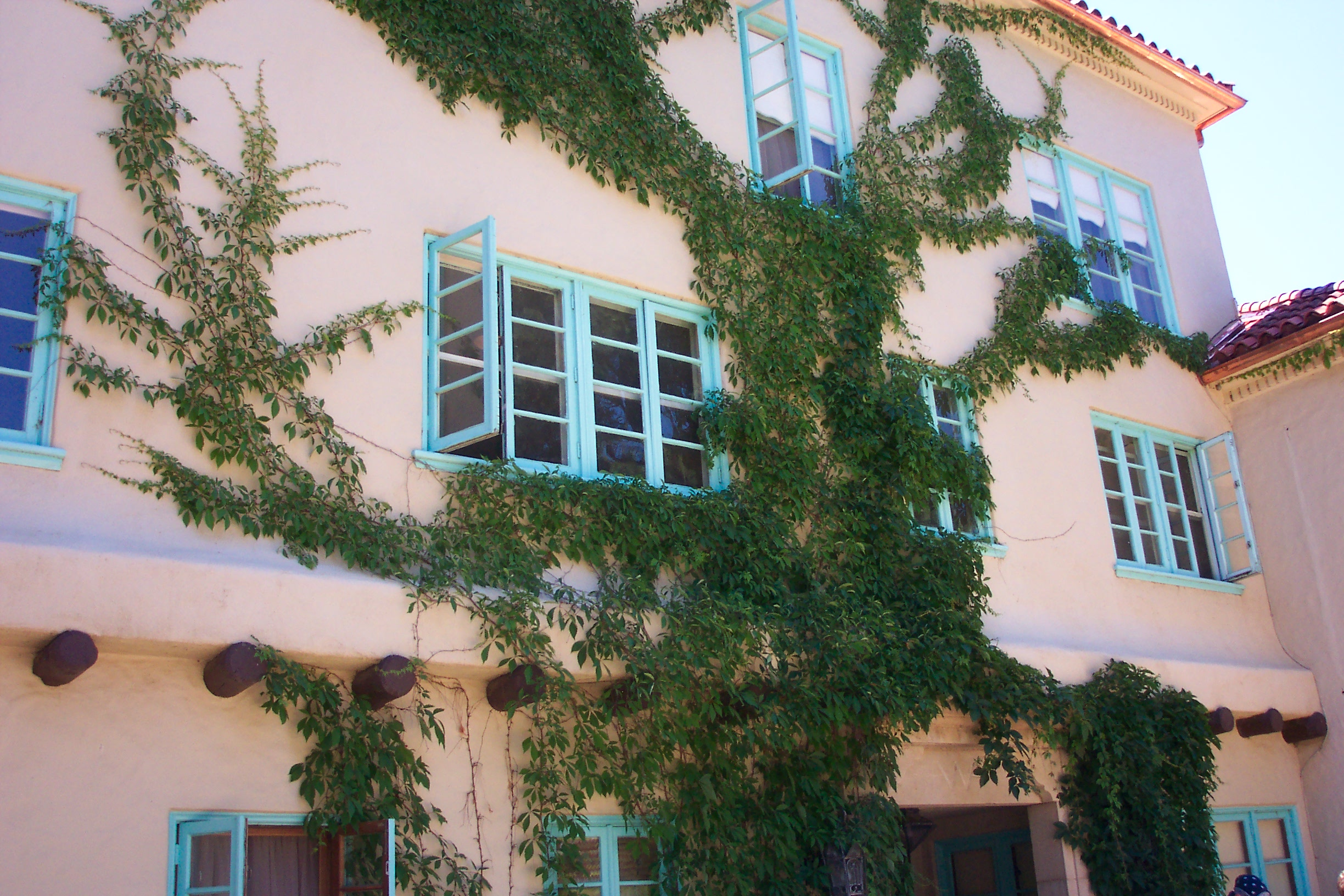
Vines climb an exterior wall

== Furnishings ==
The Villa is lavishly furnished, and retains many of Phillips’ original furnishings and collections, including particularly notable displays of antiques and weapons. The building features a large courtyard with a fountain in the center, large columns, and numerous porticoes. The interior was decorated using an eclectic mix of European, American, and Southwestern furnishings. The grand piano in the entrance is worth an estimated $200,000.

A small window on the second floor that looks towards the ranch was added to the house by Phillips after construction was completed. He wanted the window added so he could view a large rock formation on a nearby mountain. The rock was subsequently named Window Rock.

A display window on the stairs between the first and second floor shows a landscape of saguaro cacti and a wagon being pulled by horses. In fact, wagons on the Santa Fe Trail were pulled by oxen, and there are no saguaro cacti in New Mexico.

== See also ==
- National Register of Historic Places listings in Colfax County, New Mexico
