= Waite Phillips =

American businessman (1883–1964)

- Born: January 19, 1883; Taylor County, Iowa, U.S.
- Died: January 27, 1964 (aged 81); Los Angeles, California, U.S.
- Occupation: American petroleum businessman
- Spouse: Genevieve Elliott
- Children: 2

Waite Phillips (January 19, 1883 – January 27, 1964) was an American petroleum businessman who created a fully integrated operation that combined petroleum producing, refining and marketing. With headquarters in Tulsa, Oklahoma, he also developed several office complexes and engaged in banking and ranching. Phillips was a philanthropist for both local Tulsa institutions and national causes. In Tulsa he built a 72-room mansion for his residence, which he later donated to the city; it became the Philbrook Museum of Art. He gave 127,000 acres (510 km^{2}) of his favorite ranch in New Mexico to the Boy Scouts of America, together with an office building as part of its endowment. The ranch is now Philmont Scout Ranch, one of the largest youth camps in the world. Phillips also made a substantial bequest to the University of Southern California, which named a building after him.

== Early life and education ==
Waite Phillips and his identical twin brother Wiate were born near Conway, Iowa to Civil War veteran Lewis "Lew" Franklin Phillips and Lucinda Josephine "Josie" Faucett Phillips. Waite, the younger twin, was the seventh of ten children born into the Phillips family.

In 1899, at age 16, Waite and Wiate left the 40-acre (16 ha) farm they called home, boarded a train and headed west. Their travels took them to most of the western and midwestern United States and parts of Canada. To support themselves, they worked a variety of jobs in fields such as railroad building, mining and lumbering, and spent one winter trapping fur animals in the Bitterroot Mountains. Their adventure came to an end in Spokane, Washington on July 16, 1902, when Wiate died as a result of acute appendicitis.

== Career ==
Waite returned home to Iowa and, after six months of college studies, launched into an active business career. Under the guidance and help of his elder brothers, Frank and L. E. Phillips, he moved from a short period of coal mining in Iowa to petroleum operations in 1906, centered in Bartlesville, Oklahoma. His brothers created the business which became known as Phillips Petroleum Company.

In 1914, Phillips sold his oil interests to his elder brothers. He started on his own as an individual oil producer, refiner and marketer. His fully integrated and extensive oil operations lasted almost 40 years. After 1918, he had his headquarters in Tulsa, Oklahoma. While in Tulsa, Phillips built several office complexes, such as the Philtower and Philcade Buildings. He also had a mansion built, the 72-room Italian Renaissance-style Villa Philbrook. In 1938 during the Great Depression, Phillips donated his immense home to the city of Tulsa, which adapted it into the Philbrook Museum of Art. Each of these buildings has been listed on the National Register of Historic Places. After donating the mansion to the city, Phillips and his wife Genevieve moved into a 23-room 3,000 square feet (280 m^{2}) penthouse residence that he had added to the Philcade in 1937. That became their primary residence in Tulsa until Waite sold the building in 1942.

In addition to his oil business, Phillips was actively engaged in banking, city real estate developments and the operation of ranches in several Rocky Mountain regions. His first choice of ranches were lands in the western foothills of the Sangre de Cristo Mountains near Cimarron, New Mexico, acquired in 1922. After disposing of his other ranches, he developed the 300,000-acre (1,200 km^{2}) UU Ranch into diversified farming and livestock operations. Waite built the Villa Philmonte as his summer house. On the ranch, he also built mountain trails, a hunting lodge and a fishing lodge, all of which he found to be restful retreats from business pressures in Tulsa.

== Philanthropy ==
Phillips sometimes allowed others to visit his ranch, including a few Boy Scout troops. In 1938 and 1941, Phillips donated 127,000 acres (510 km^{2}) of his Ranch to the Boy Scouts of America, complete with water, mineral and timber rights. The only condition was that it be used "for the benefit of the members of the Boy Scout organization" and the second larger donation had only the condition that it pay its fair share of taxes on any portion devoted to competitive commercial operations. As an endowment, he donated the 23-story Philtower Building in Tulsa. These donations were made without any rights of management reserved by the donor. All equipment and livestock were included in the gift with the idea that diversified ranch operations would provide educational benefits to Boy Scouts and would add to the endowment income. In honor of Phillips, the Boy Scouts of America renamed the newly donated land Philturn Rocky Mountain Scout Camp. Later the property was renamed Philmont Scout Ranch. His son Chope visited frequently, until his passing in 2015 at age 97.

Phillips died in 1964 and a primary beneficiary of his estate was the University of Southern California. USC built a 12-story building, named the "Waite Phillips Hall", which was dedicated in 1968.

In 1943, Phillips was inducted into the Oklahoma Hall of Fame.

== Marriage and family ==
In 1909, he married Genevieve Elliott in Knoxville, Iowa. Waite and Genevieve had two children, Helen Jane (July 1, 1911 – May 19, 1963; age 52) and Elliott "Chope" Waite (January 11, 1918 – April 26, 2015). Helen Jane married baseball player and attorney William R. Breckinridge.

Waite Phillips died on January 27, 1964, at age 81. Waite and Genevieve Phillips are buried in Westwood Village Memorial Park Cemetery in Los Angeles, California.

== See also ==
- Mount Phillips (New Mexico)
- Phillips Petroleum Company
