= Maxwell Land Grant =

1841 Mexican land grant

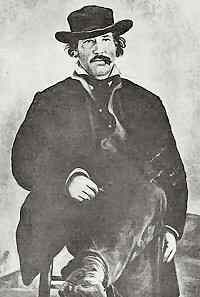
The grant was owned by frontiersman Lucien B. Maxwell.

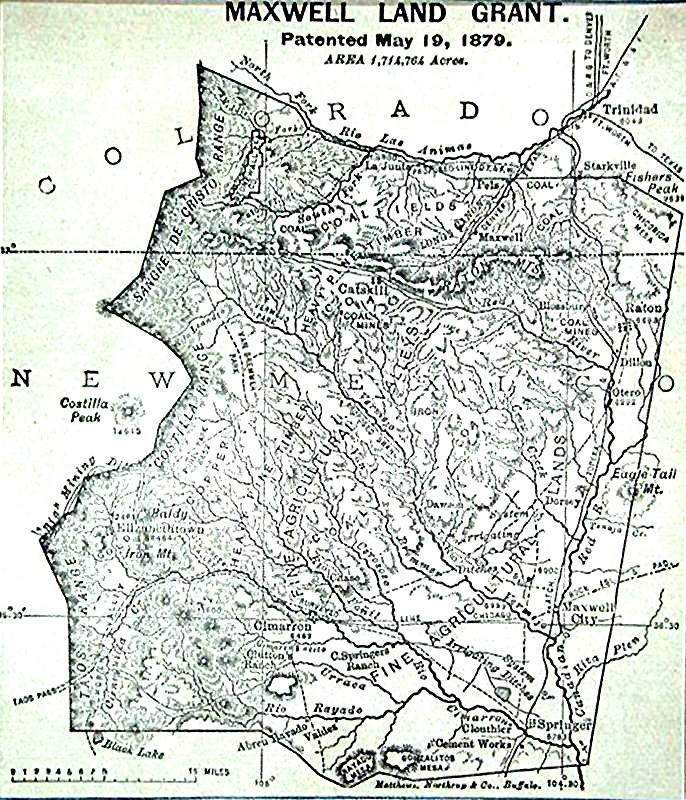
An 1893 map of the Maxwell Land Grant in New Mexico and Colorado.

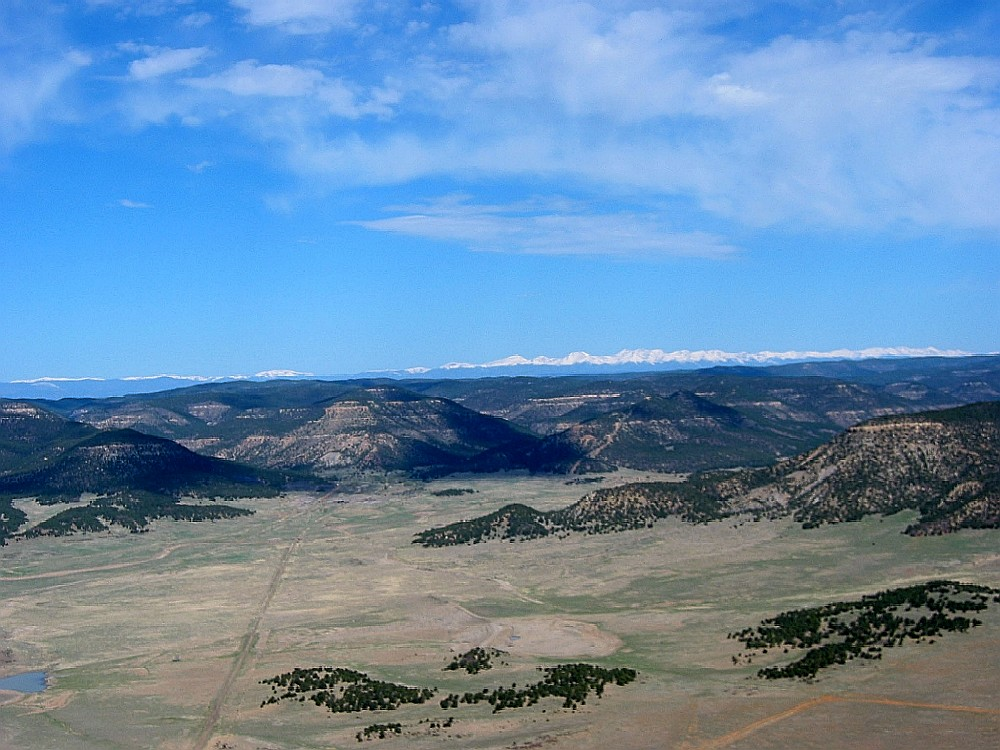
The lands of the grant reach from the Great Plains to the crest of the Sangre de Cristo mountains an east-west distance of almost 50 miles (80 km).

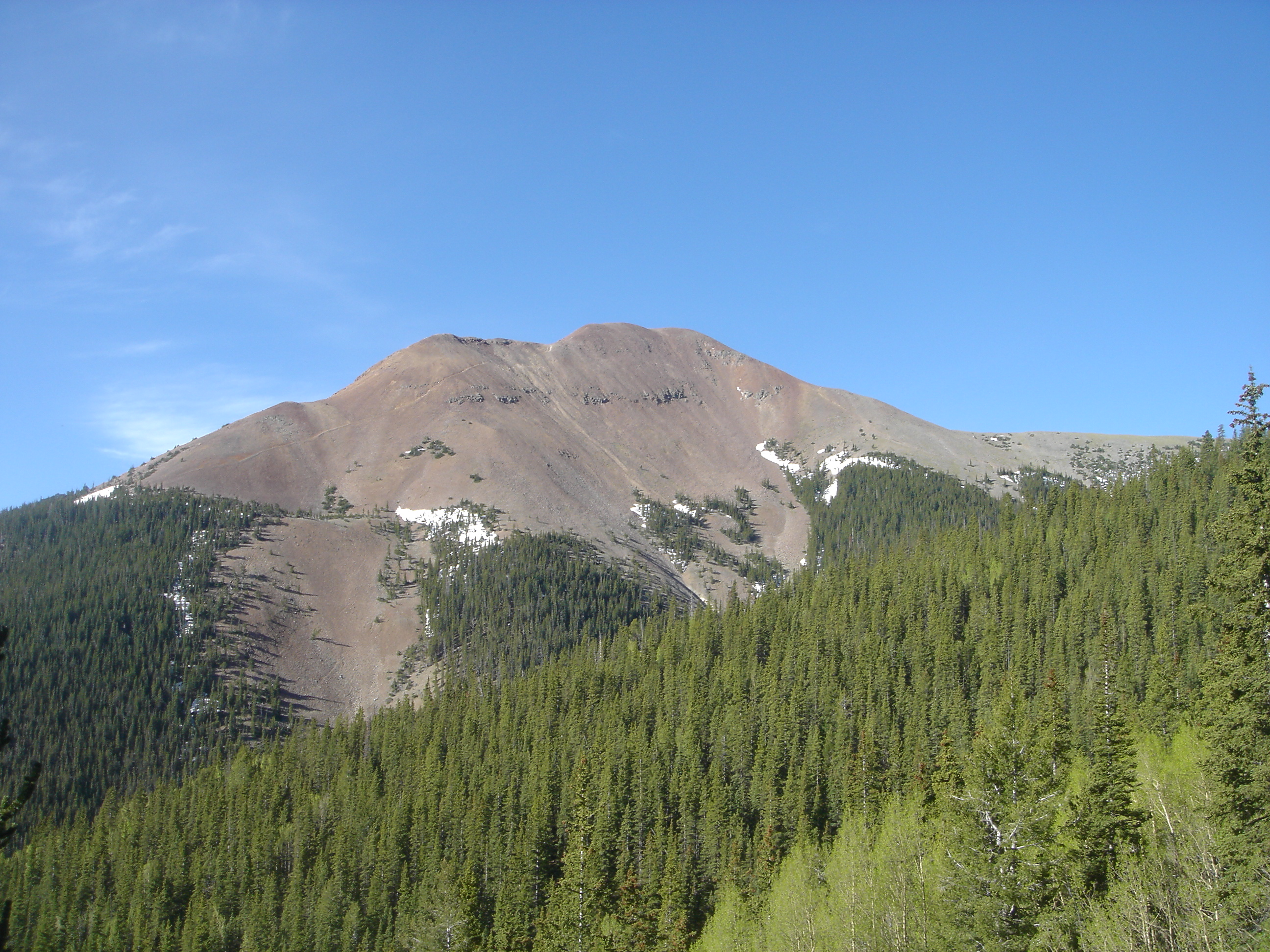
Baldy Mountain, 12,441 ft (3,792 m) in elevation, is in the grant area.

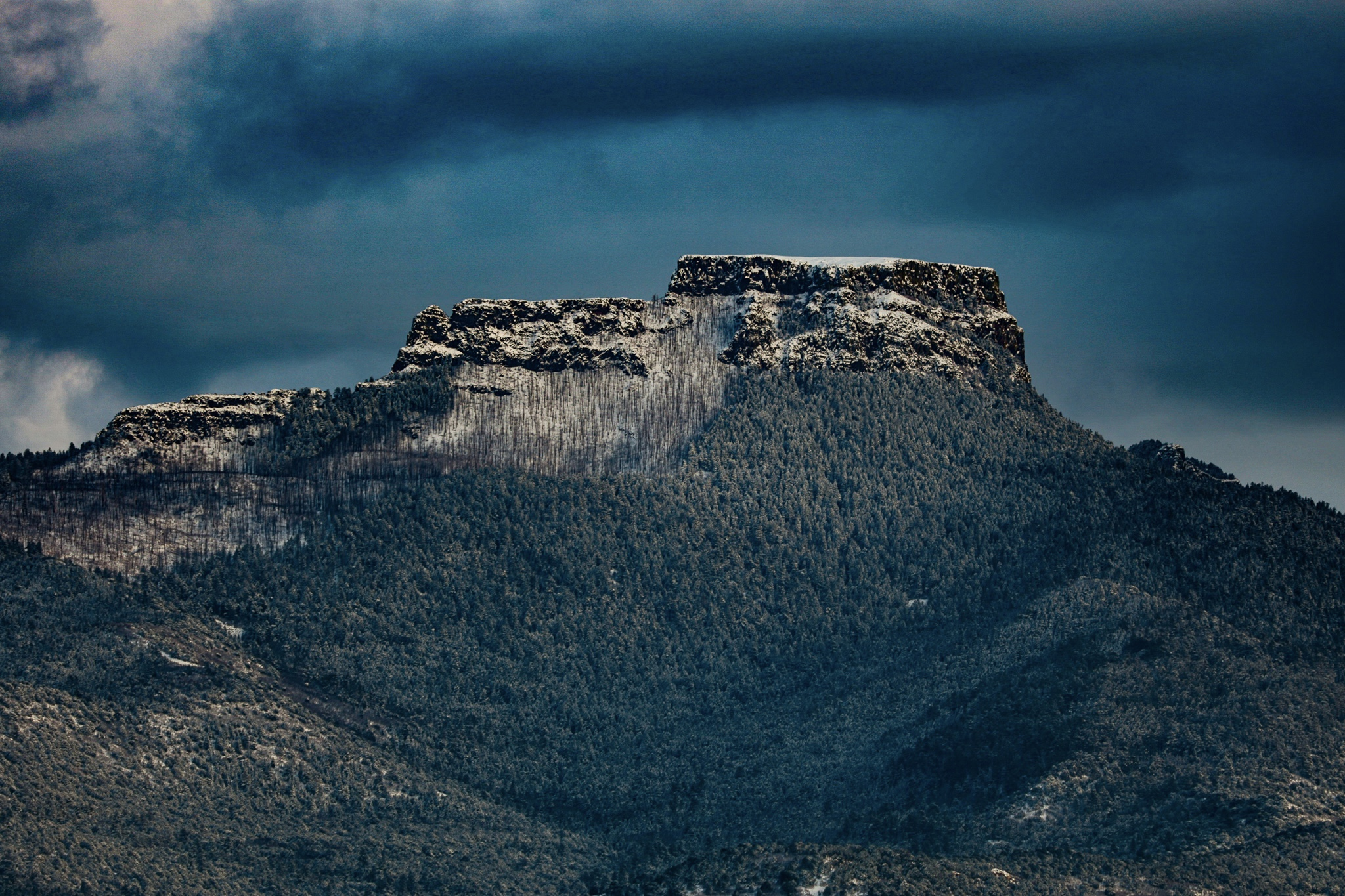
Fishers Peak in Colorado is the northeastern boundary of the grant.

The Maxwell Land Grant, also known as the Beaubien-Miranda Land Grant, was a 1,714,765-acre (6,939.41 km^{2}) Mexican land grant in Colfax County, New Mexico, and part of adjoining Las Animas County, Colorado. This 1841 land grant was one of the largest contiguous private landholdings in the history of the United States. The New Mexico communities of Cimarron, Dawson, Elizabethtown, Baldy Town, Maxwell, Miami, Raton, Rayado, Springer, Ute Park and Vermejo Park came to be located within the grant, as well as numerous places that are now ghost towns.

The governor of New Mexico (then part of Mexico) awarded the grant to Mexican citizens Carlos Beaubien and Guadalupe Miranda in 1841. Boundaries at first were vague. The owners encouraged settlement on the grant lands. Beaubien's son-in-law Lucien B. Maxwell attained ownership of the grant and sold it to European investors in 1870. Gold and coal mining, ranching, and agriculture were the principal economic activities on grant lands. The grant had been established and first settled on the basis of Mexican land law and practices. Anglo land law clashed with Mexican law resulting in many legal disputes about the ownership of grant lands and rights of the owners, settlers, and miners. In the Colfax County War and Stonewall incident in the 1870s and 1880s several people were killed and the U.S. military had to be called in to maintain order. By 1900, the ownership disputes had been resolved by the Supreme Court of the United States in favor of the European investors, settlers had been expelled from the grant, and the European owners began selling off portions of the land.

Owners of the land within the grant in the 20th and 21st century include the Vermejo Park Ranch, Philmont Scout Ranch, the National Rifle Association of America, the Maxwell National Wildlife Refuge, Fishers Peak State Park, and the U.S. Forest Service.

== Geography ==
The Maxwell Land grant has an area of 1,714,765 acres (6,939.41 km^{2}) in New Mexico and southern Colorado. The grant lands measure almost 60 miles (97 km) from north to south and 50 miles (80 km) from east to west, reaching from the Great Plains to the crest of the Sangre de Cristo Mountains. The highest elevation in the grant is Culebra Peak near its northwestern border in Colorado with an elevation of 14,053 ft (4,283 m) and the lowest elevation is 5,700 ft (1,700 m) near the town of Springer, New Mexico at its southeastern border.

The northern boundaries of the Maxwell grant are the south bank and southern tributaries of the Purgatoire River in Colorado from its headwaters near Culebra Peak downstream almost to the city of Trinidad, Colorado. The summit of Fishers Peak is the northeastern corner of the grant. In New Mexico the grant area contains the headwaters of the Canadian River and its tributaries the Cimmaron, Vermejo, and Rayado rivers. The southeastern boundary is near the town of Springer and extends westward almost to the 21st century Angel Fire Resort. Raton, New Mexico (2020 population: 6,041) is the largest town within the boundaries of the grant.

Vegetation types are typical of New Mexico and correspond to elevation. Steppe grassland is found at the lowest elevations. At progressively higher elevations are piñon-juniper woodlands, ponderosa pine forests, spruce-fir and aspen forests, and Krummholz. Alpine tundra is found at elevations above 12,000 ft (3,700 m). Snowfall is heavy at the highest elevations.

== History ==
=== Early days ===
The land in the Maxwell Land Grant were originally occupied by the Jicarilla Apache Indians. In 1885, Helen Hunt Jackson's report for the Bureau of Indian Affairs reported the Jicarilla Apaches numbered 850 at Cimarron Agency, living upon what was called "Maxwell's Grant" in northeastern New Mexico. In 1821, Mexico achieved independence from Spain and the new government of New Mexico continued the Spanish policy of encouraging settlement by making land grants. In the 1840s, during the last years of Mexican rule, in what have been called "grants of desperation," the New Mexican governor made several large individual grants to reward supporters and cronies, secure the borders of New Mexico against Indians, and counter growing U.S. influence, including fear of invasion of New Mexico by either the U.S. or Texas which was an independent county from 1836-1845.

=== Beaubien and Miranda ===
Carlos Beaubien (often called Charles) was a French-Canadian trapper who became a Mexican citizen and a prosperous merchant in Taos, New Mexico His partner, Guadalupe Miranda, was the secretary to Governor Manuel Armijo in Santa Fe. On January 8, 1841, Beaubien and Miranda petitioned Armijo for a land grant. They had to swear that they would colonize and cultivate the land. Three days later, Armijo granted them the land on the condition that they put it to good use. However, Beaubien and Miranda failed to prove up the grant for the next two years. Taking possession of the delay was occasioned by an invasion by Texas, but on February 13, 1843, they asked the justice of the peace in Taos to sign an order promising them possession of the land. The justice affirmed that he had marked the boundaries of the grant and that Beaubien and Miranda were in full possession of the land grant. Beaubien and Miranda gave Governor Armijo a one-fourth interest in the grant on March 2, 1843. Later, they gave trader Charles Bent a one-fourth interest in the grant to promote settlement on the lands of the grant.

The encroachments and the prominence of non-Hispanics in New Mexico caused a backlash. Padre Martinez (Antonio José Martínez) claimed the grant was illegal but a lawsuit was decided in favor of Beaubien and Miranda on April 18, 1844. Beaubien and Bent began settlement of the grant land along Ponil Creek and near the present site of Cimarron. In 1845, the first two Anglos, Kit Carson and Dick Owens, settled on grant land. In 1846, after the United States invasion of New Mexico in the Mexican-American War, Bent and Beaubien became officials in the new U.S. government of New Mexico territory. Armijo and Miranda fled to Mexico. On January 18, 1847, Hispanic rioters in the Taos Revolt killed Charles Bent, Narciso Beaubien (the son of Charles), and Cornelio Virgil, who had established the Cimarron settlement. Beaubien survived as he was not in Taos at the time.

The Jicarilla Apache, the original inhabitants of the grant lands, resisted white settlements until about 1855 when they were forced to sign a peace treaty with the U.S and began to move westward to an Indian Reservation.

=== Lucien B. Maxwell ===
Lucien Bonaparte Maxwell, born in Illinois, was a mountain man, farmer, rancher, and merchant who married Luz Beaubien, the daughter of Carlos Beaubien. Beaubien hired Maxwell to manage his interests, and Maxwell and his wife settled first near the site of Rayado, New Mexico, in 1849. In 1860, Maxwell built a large home in Cimarron, a stop on the Mountain Branch of the Santa Fe Trail. In Maxwell's household was Deluvina, a young Navajo girl Maxwell purchased from Apaches when they traveled through his ranch in the Cimarron Valley. Deluvina cared for several of Maxwell's children and grandchildren and later was a friend of Billy the Kid.

Maxwell made money by supplying beef and other commodities to the soldiers at Fort Union and to the Jicarillas living in the area. He acquired ownership of all the land within the grant from the other heirs and lived in "frontier splendor"...lavishly hospitable to all visitors." He became one of the wealthiest men in New Mexico with the discovery of gold on the grant lands near Baldy Mountain in 1867.

Maxwell sold the grant in 1870 for $650,000 to a group of Anglo and Hispanic land speculators called the Santa Fe Ring who quickly marketed it to English investors for $1,350,000 who then found Dutch investors to issue $5,000,000 in stock in the Maxwell Land Grant and Railroad Company. Meanwhile, Maxwell retired to Fort Sumner, New Mexico where he died in 1875. In 1881, Billy the Kid was killed in Maxwell's Fort Sumner home, then belonging to his son Pete Maxwell.

However, legal challenges to the grant erupted. A Mexican law of 1824 limited the size of grants to individuals to 48,000 acres (190 km^{2}). According to that law the maximum acreage of the Maxwell grant should have been 96,000 acres (390 km^{2}) as the grant was made to two persons, Beaubien and Miranda. In 1869, a government survey determined that the Maxwell grant should legally only comprise 96,000 acres. A ten-year court battle ensued in which the new grant owners obtained title to all 1,714,765 acres (693,941 ha) of the original grant.

=== Foreign ownership and violent resistance ===
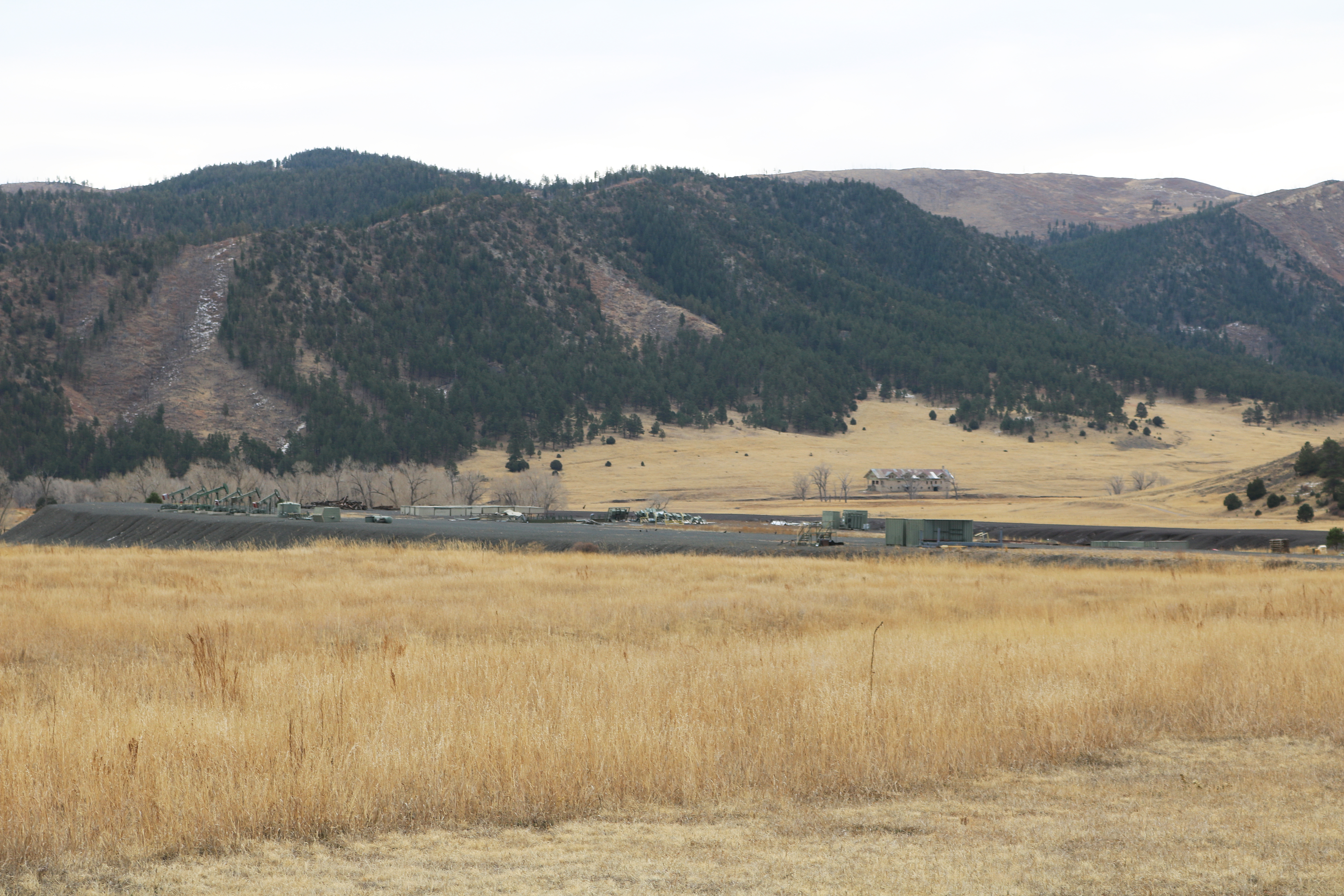
The ghost town of Tercio, Colorado. Coal mining was important in the early 20th century.

The new foreign owners faced a different property rights situation than was their experience. The right to reside upon and use the land in New Mexico was based on traditional practices and customs, common lands, and relationships and reciprocal obligations similar to the medieval practice of lords and vassals. Documents regarding land ownership were few and far between. By contrast, the Anglo system demanded the identification of owners, precise definition of what was owned, and legal documents substantiating ownership. Anglo judges generally did not understand the New Mexican system and favored the Anglo to the detriment of Hispanics occupying land in the Maxwell grant.

In 1870, when the British and later Dutch owners took ownership of the Maxwell grant a substantial population of Anglo, Hispanic, and Jicarilla miners and farmers were living on the land. The gold-mining town of Elizabethtown had a population of almost 7,000. By the mid 1870s it was a ghost town as the mines ceased to be profitable, but farmers and ranchers occupied lands and some of the miners settled down within the grant area. The Maxwell Land Grant Company intended to develop the resources of the grant which included coal, timber, ranch and farm lands and tried to collect rent from the inhabitants and expel those who refused to pay rent. The inhabitants claimed that they lived in the public domain or had been given the rights to the land by Lucien Maxwell. Protests erupted and on October 27, 1870 miners burned down the company's office in Elizabethtown. Soldiers were sent into Elizabethtown to keep the peace and more than a decade of legal battles began concerning ownership of the land.

Attempts to evict the settlers on the grant, who the company called "squatters," were aided by members of the unsavory Santa Fe Ring of land speculators, several of whom occupied prominent positions in the New Mexican government. In 1875, in the Colfax County War, an anti-Maxwell company preacher named F.J. Tolby was murdered which initiated a series of murders related to the dispute between company and settlers. Many of the settlers either departed or were evicted, but in 1885 there were still 380 homesites, divided about equally between Anglos and Hispanics, in the grant area. The Jicarilla had been relocated by this time to a reservation west of the Maxwell grant land. The Maxwell Company's attempts to evict the settlers living on grant lands got help from the Supreme Court of the United States which ruled in 1887 that the company was the legal owner of the 1.7 million acres in the grant. Armed with the Supreme Court decision, the Maxwell company redoubled its efforts to evict settlers.

The Stonewall incident in 1888 was the most violent of many incidents in the dispute between the Maxwell Company and the settlers on grant lands. The company had sold 5,000 acres (2,000 ha) of grant land in Colorado to a group of investors including Colorado governor, Alva Adams. The investors intended to develop the land for tourism and sought the immediate eviction of the settlers. A large group of settlers, mostly Hispanics, gathered to protest and surrounded a hotel in Stonewall where the company's employees barricaded themselves. A gunfight ensued in which three of the protesters were shot and killed. In the aftermath several of the protesters were arrested and later convicted of inciting a riot.

Most Anglos were either evicted or made peace with the company by 1890, but resistance by Hispanics consisting of raids on company property to cut fences and burn barns peaked in 1891. The company managed to quell the resistance by signing leases with Hispanic settlers which gave the company 25 percent of their crops. The company's top priority was to obtain clear ownership of the land and the leases were in accord with the Hispanic custom in New Mexico of "partido." By signing leases, the settlers acknowledged the ownership of the company. The Maxwell company was also mindful of the "wars" in other parts of New Mexico in which Hispanics had successfully organized to win partial victories over land speculators and developers.

In 1894 the Supreme Court reaffirmed its 1887 decision erasing the last hopes of settlers for legal remedies to prevent their expulsion from the grant lands. By 1899 the Maxwell company had gained uncontested ownership of nearly all the land in the Maxwell grant.

== Land sales ==
=== Dawson ===
In the late 1860s, Lucien Maxwell sold more than 24,000 acres (97 km^{2}) of land to John Barkley Dawson for $3,700. The Maxwell Company later attempted to evict Dawson but his ownership of the land was confirmed by a court in 1901. Coal was discovered on the land in 1895 and in 1901 Dawson sold the land to C.B Eddy for $400,000. Eddy and associates created the Dawson Fuel Company and constructed a railroad to the site of the mines. In 1905 Eddy sold the mines and railroad to the Phelps Dodge Company. The mining town of Dawson, New Mexico grew to have a population of 6,000 in 1913. In that same year an explosion killed 263 workers, most of whom were Hispanics and foreign-born Italians, Greeks, and others. In 1923 another mine explosion killed 122 miners. In 1950, the mines were closed and Dawson became a ghost town.

=== Chase Ranch ===
In 1867, Manly and Theresa Chase settled along Ponil Creek. They purchased 1,900 acres (770 ha) for $2.50 per acre from Lucien Maxwell. Manly became the manager and owner of several sheep ranches later established in the region. The Chase family expanded the ranch to comprise 11,000 acres. The last descendant of the Chase family to own the ranch died in 2012. In 2013, the ranch signed a 50-year lease with the Philmont Scout Ranch giving Philmont the management of the ranch.

=== Vermejo Park and Valle Vidal ===
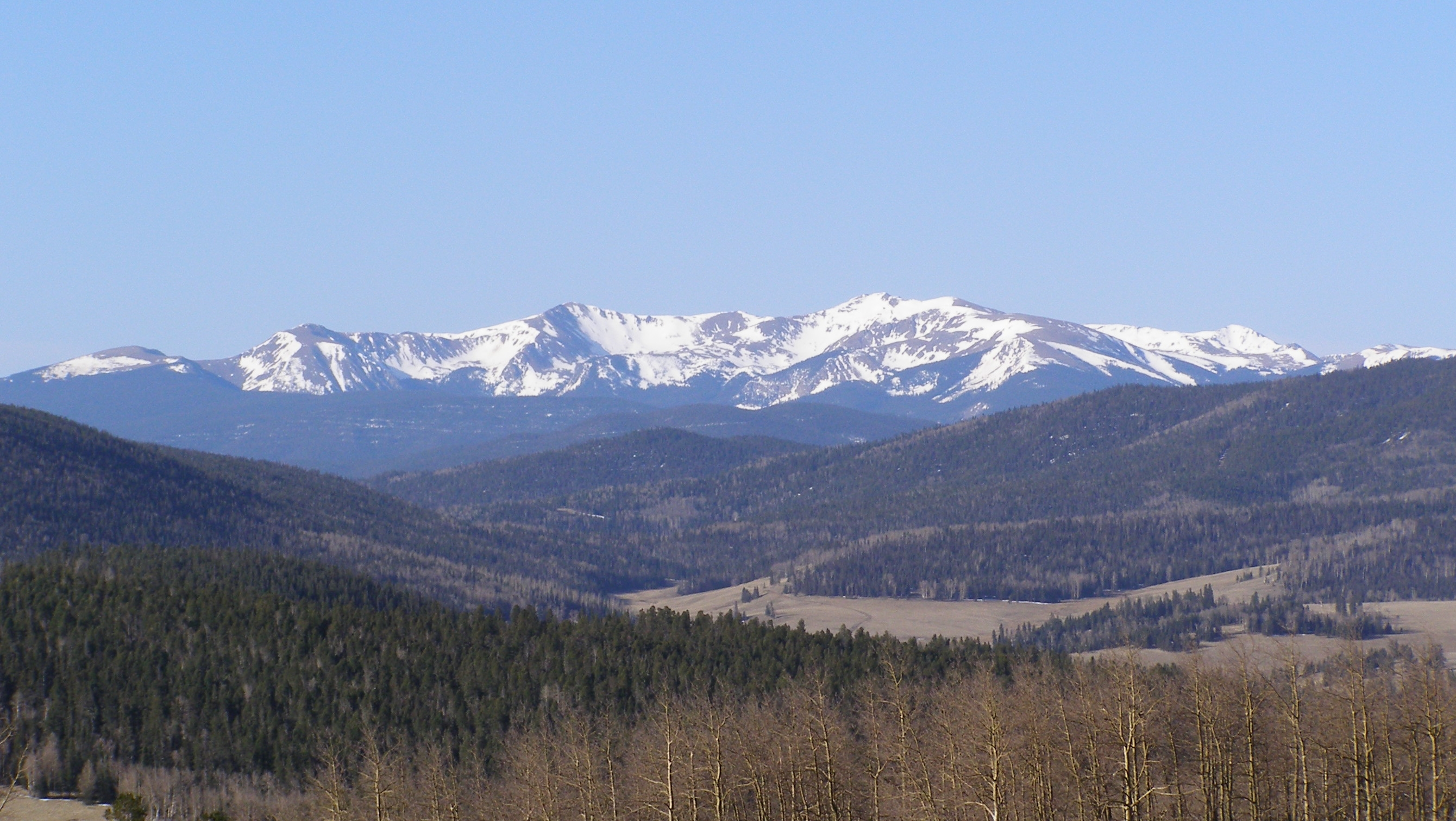
Valle Vidal is a high elevation valley looking toward the Sangre de Cristo Range.

In 1902, William Bartlett, a wealthy grain operator from Chicago, bought 205,000 acres (830 km^{2}) of the grant along the drainage of the Vermejo River. Under the agreement, he withheld part of the last payment until the Maxwell Land Grant Company evicted the last of the Hispanic "squatters" who had lived for many years along the Vermejo River. Bartlett's Vermejo Park portion of the grant passed through several owners during the twentieth century. In 1926, Vermejo Park became an exclusive fishing and hunting club whose guests included many wealthy businessmen and Hollywood celebrities. Pennzoil bought the Vermejo Park Ranch in 1973. In 1982, Pennzoil donated 101,794 acres (411.95 km^{2}) of the ranch known as Valle Vidal to the US government. This area is managed by the US Forest Service. In 1992 media owner Ted Turner purchased the property from Pennzoil. He used much of the former cattle pasturage for bison, traditionally called buffalo in North America. He opened the Vermejo Park lodge to paying guests, mostly fishermen and hunters. Atlas Energy Group produces gas on the ranch. The Vermejo Park Ranch consists of 550,000 acres (2,200 km^{2}), most of which was part of the Maxwell Land Grant.

=== Philmont ===
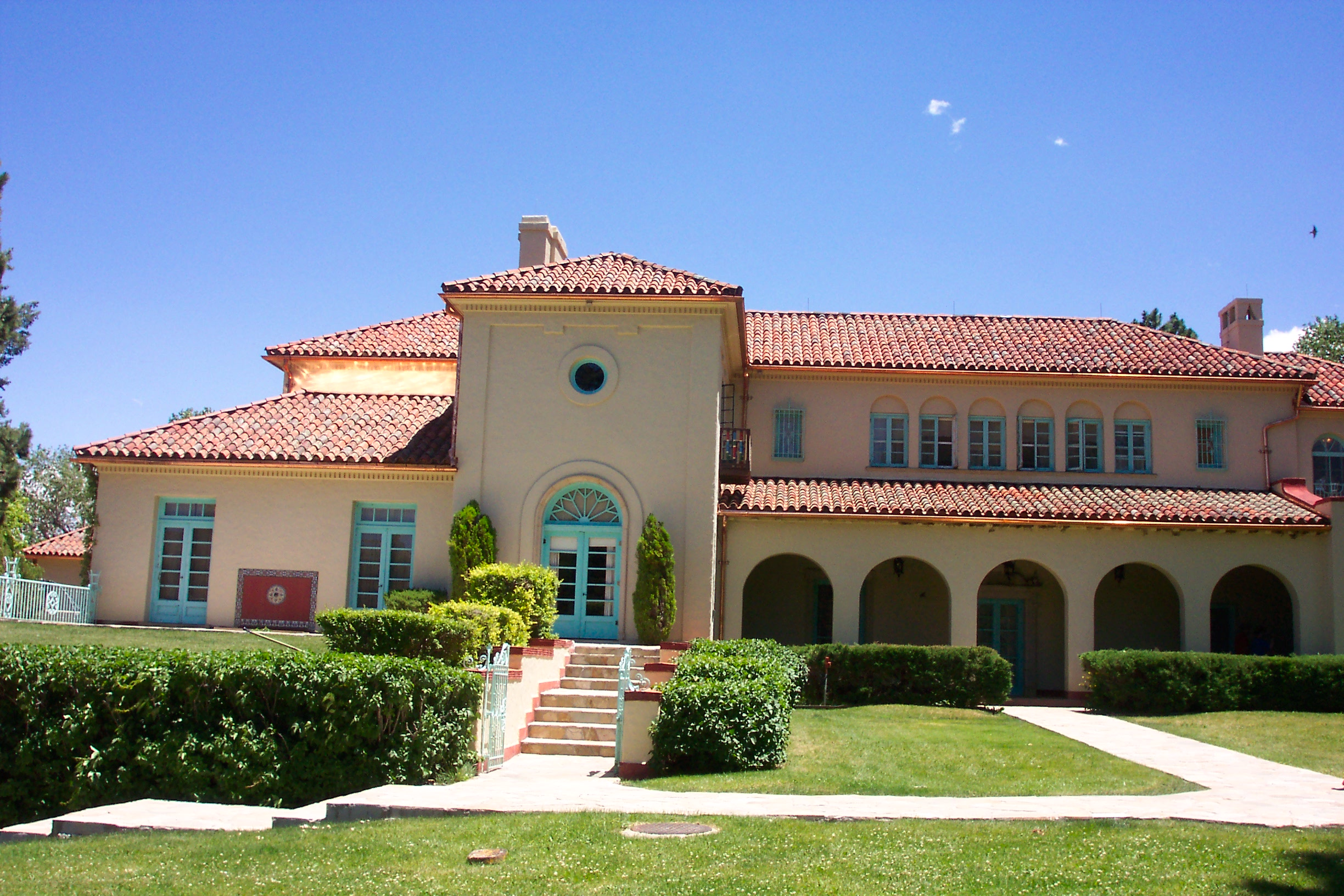
Waite Phillips home, now owned by Philmont Scout Ranch.

Beginning in 1922, Waite Phillips, an oilman from Tulsa, Oklahoma, assembled a block of land on the Maxwell Land Grant. Phillips bought over 300,000 acres (1,200 km^{2}), and named his ranch Philmont. In two separate gifts in 1938 and 1941, Phillips donated 127,395 acres (515.55 km^{2}) as a wilderness camping area for the Boy Scouts of America. In 1963, Norton Clapp, an officer of the National Council of the Boy Scouts of America, donated another piece of the Maxwell Land Grant to Philmont. This was the Baldy Mountain mining area consisting of 10,098 acres (40.87 km^{2}).

=== Other parcels ===
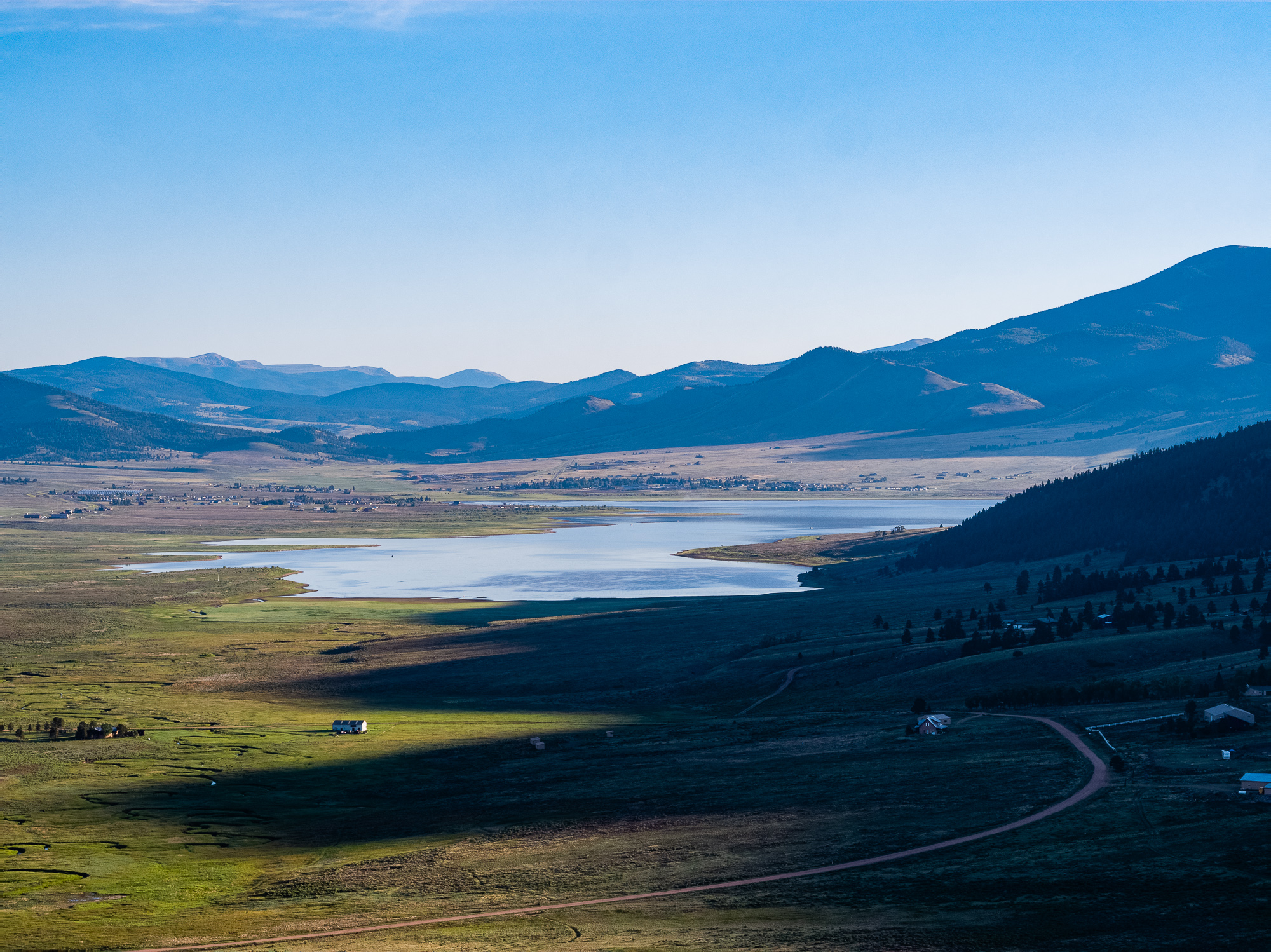
The Moreno Valley and Eagle Nest Lake, 8,172 ft (2,491 m) in elevation, are located near the western boundaries of the grant area.

Cimarron Canyon State Park extends along Cimarron Canyon from Eagle Nest Lake to Ute Park and along U.S. Route 64. The park is part of the Colin Neblett State Wildlife Area, which consists of 33,116 acres (134.02 km^{2}) acres of former grant land. This area was purchased by the state of New Mexico in the early 1950s.

The Whittington Center, founded in 1973, is the largest shooting and hunting complex in the world. It is owned by the National Rifle Association and covers 33,000 acres (130 km^{2}) of the Maxwell Land Grant.

Fishers Peak State Park in Colorado is 19,200 acres (78 km^{2}) in area. The State Park was established in 2020 by the purchase of a privately owned ranch by the state of Colorado. The Maxwell National Wildlife Refuge, 3,699 acres (14.97 km^{2}), in New Mexico preserves habitat for waterfowl and other animals.

== Supreme Court cases ==
Six cases involving the land grant went to the United States Supreme Court:

- Maxwell Land-Grant Case, 121 U.S. 325 (1887)
- Maxwell Land-Grant Case, 122 U.S. 365 (1887)
- Interstate Land Co. v. Maxwell Land Grant Co., 139 U.S. 569 (1891)
- Maxwell Land Grant Co. v. Dawson, 151 U.S. 586 (1894)
- Russell v. Maxwell Land Grant Co., 158 U.S. 253 (1895)
- Thompson v. Maxwell Land Grant & R. Co., 168 U.S. 451 (1897)
