= Vermejo Reserve =

Guest ranch in New Mexico, United States

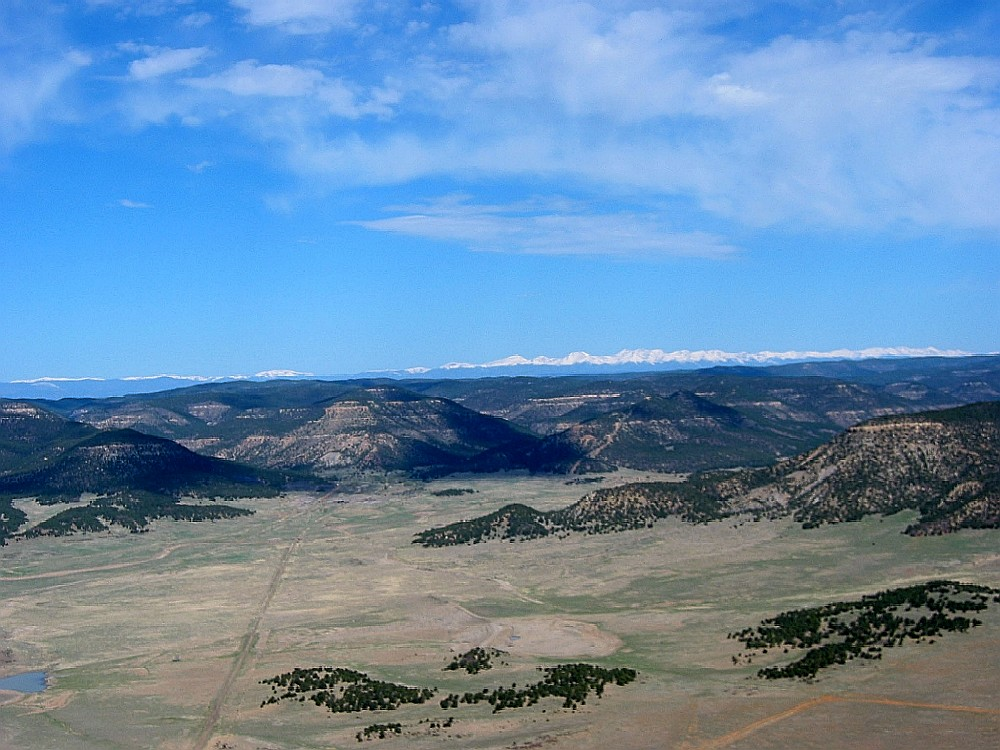
- Looking west towards Valle Vidal the Great Plains in the foreground, February 2011.
- Interactive map of Vermejo Reserve
- Location: Colfax / Taos counties, New Mexico and Las Animas / Costilla counties, Colorado, United States
- Nearest city: Raton, New Mexico
- Coordinates: 36°53′21″N 104°58′45″W
- Operator: Ted Turner Reserves
- Owner: Ted Turner
- Website: https://tedturnerreserves.com/vermejo/

Vermejo Reserve is a 558,000-acre (226,000 ha) nature reserve and guest operation in northeastern New Mexico and southern Colorado. Also known as Vermejo Park Ranch, Ted Turner Reserves, the luxury hospitality company founded by Ted Turner, operates it as a center for conservation research and ecosystem restoration along with guest accommodations. The ranch, which stretches from the Great Plains at an elevation of 5,867 feet (1,788 m) to the summit of the Sangre de Cristo Mountains, reaches an elevation of 12,931 ft (3,941 m). The property produces significant quantities of coalbed methane, a type of natural gas.

== History ==
Vermejo Park was originally part of the Maxwell Land Grant. After Vermejo Park went through several owners in the late-19th century, William H. Bartlett (1850–1918) of Chicago, Illinois bought 205,000 acres (83,000 ha) from the Maxwell Land Grant Company in 1902. Under the agreement, he withheld part of the last payment until the Maxwell Land Grant Company evicted the last of the Hispanic "squatters" who had lived for many years along the Vermejo River. He hired close friend and Chicago architect, Joseph Lyman Silsbee to help him make improvements, including three large residences (including the main Casa Grande) and a power plant. He re-introduced elk to the park and built and stocked several lakes with trout. He expanded the property to 300,000 acres (120,000 ha).

Bartlett died at the ranch in 1918 and his sons, who had managed the ranch, died within two years.

A syndicate of New York, St. Louis, and Chicago businessmen took an option to buy the property and organized the Vermejo Park Club, selling memberships to Tex Austin, Billy Mitchell, Amon Carter, and the Frederick Guest family. A member of the Guest family shot an elk which at the time was the ninth largest in the world; it is now on display at the Museum of Natural History in New York. The syndicate, however, was unable to raise the US$1.8 million asking price and the original club was disbanded.

In 1926, Los Angeles Times baron Harry Chandler bought the property from Bartlett. In 1927 Chandler and his investors opened a new Vermejo Park Club attracting Will Rogers, Cecil B. DeMille, Douglas Fairbanks, Mary Pickford, Harvey Firestone and Herbert Hoover. The club was disbanded during the Great Depression, today bison ranching operations continue.

W. J. Gourley, a Fort Worth businessman, began buying property in the Vermejo Park area in 1945 and increased its area to 480,000 acres (1,900 km^{2}). He used the ranch for recreation as well as cattle ranching. On December 23, 1955, the large middle guest house burned and the stables were renovated to become the property's main social and dining area now called "The Stables".

Gourley died in 1970 and Pennzoil bought the property from his estate in 1973 for US$26.5 million and increased its area to 588,000 acres (2,380 km^{2}). Pennzoil continued cattle ranching and expanded the facilities for guests. In 1996 Ted Turner purchased the property from Pennzoil, put emphasis on managing wildlife. He used much of the former cattle pasturage for bison, traditionally called buffalo in North America. Ralphie V, the mascot of the Colorado Buffaloes, was born there. After living there for awhile, he decided to open it to paying guests.

=== Development of energy resources ===
Vermejo has large hydrocarbon resources estimated to consist of a 300-year reserve of bituminous coal, trillions of cubic feet of natural gas and unknown quantities of oil.

Coal mining on land later belonging to Vermejo began by 1880. Seven coal mining settlements and mines were established on the ranch: Blossburg, Brilliant, Tin Pan Canyon, and Swastiks in Dillon Canyon and Gardiner, Koehler, and Waldron canyon nearby. All were located at the lower elevations on the ranch between 6,460 feet (1,970 m) and 7,220 feet (2,200 m) elevation. The coal mines employed 3,563 miners in 1911. These miners consisted primarily of local Hispanic workers and many recent immigrants to the United States, especially from Italy and Greece. Other coal mines were located just outside the boundaries of Vermejo, notably at Dawson, New Mexico where in 1913, 263 miners were killed in the worst mining disaster ever to happen in the United States. Coal production slowly declined to insignificant levels and ceased altogether in 2002 due to the high cost of coal extraction. Land polluted or disturbed by the coal mining is still being reclaimed.

When Pennzoil sold the property to Turner in 1996, it retained mineral rights. Turner was able to impose upon the company strict environmental controls for natural gas extraction. In 1999 Pennzoil sold its mineral rights to El Paso Natural Gas. By 2011, there were 970 natural gas wells on the property, 840 of them in New Mexico and 130 in Colorado. Although touting the coalbed methane production at Vermejo, as environmentally friendly, El Paso Natural Gas ran into public opposition when it attempted to exploit natural gas resources in the neighboring publicly owned area of Valle Vidal. In 2007, Congress withdrew the 101,794 acres (41,195 ha) of Valle Vidal from energy development and mining.

== Description and geography ==
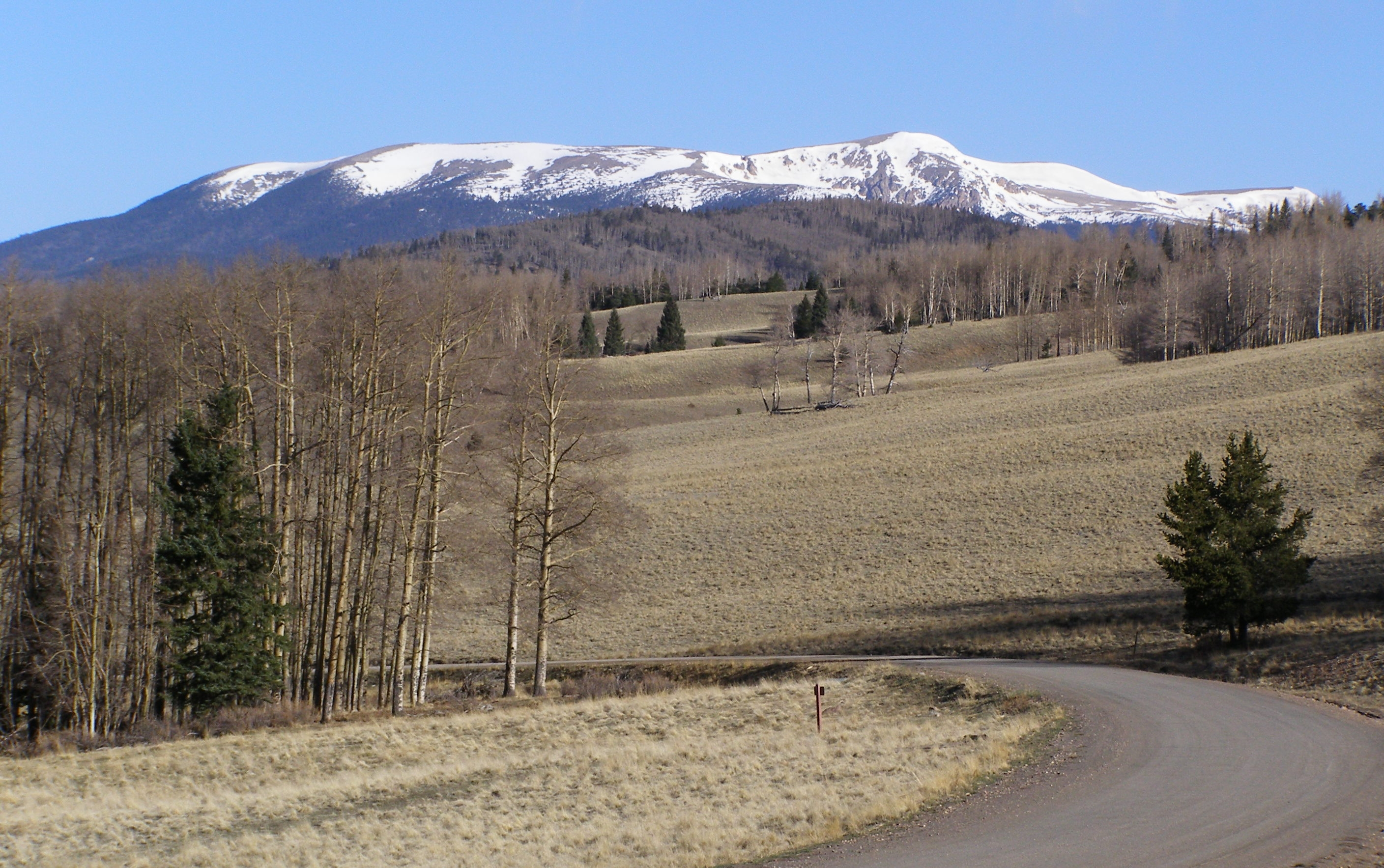
Big Costilla Peak is one of the two highest mountains on the ranch. This photo was taken from the publicly owned Valle Vidal.

Vermejo, just west of the city of Raton, is the biggest component of Turner's ranch empire of 2,000,000 acres (810,000 ha) that put him in the top ten of private landowners in the United States. It lies mostly in western Colfax County, New Mexico, but smaller portions extend into northeastern Taos County, New Mexico as well as southwestern Las Animas County and southeastern Costilla County in Colorado.

Elevations of Vermejo range from 5,850 feet (1,780 m) on the Canadian River near Maxwell, New Mexico to Big Costilla Peak which rises to 12,931 feet (3,941 m) on the western boundary of the reserve and the border between New Mexico and Colorado. Most of the reserve consists of the Park Plateau, part of the Raton Basin, a much dissected tableland with elevations from 6,500 feet (2,000 m) to about 9,000 feet (2,700 m). The westernmost extension of Vermejo is in the Sangre de Cristo Mountains with elevations from 9,000 feet (2,700 m) to above timberline. An eight-mile long, north-south ridge with four summits above 12,750 feet (3,890 m) including Big Costilla Peak form the western boundary.

Most of Vermejo is drained by the Canadian River and its tributary, Vermejo Creek. The Canadian is part of the Mississippi River drainage basin. A small portion in the western part of the ranch, the East Fork of Costilla Creek, drains into the Rio Grande. Costilla Reservoir is on the East Fork of Costilla Creek. About 20 lakes, both natural and artificial, are scattered around the higher elevations.

== Vegetation and climate ==
Vermejo, has the typical life zones of the southern Rocky Mountains. Below 6,500 feet (2,000 m) Great Plains grassland and steppe vegetation is dominant. From 6,400 feet (2,000 m) to 7,800 feet (2,400 m) Piñon pine-juniper woodland is common, especially on south facing slopes. Ponderosa pine forests are found between 7,100 feet (2,200 m) and 8,400 feet (2,600 m) elevations. A mixed conifer forest, consisting mostly of Douglas fir, white fir, and ponderosa pine, is found between the elevations of 7,000 feet (2,100 m) and 9,800 feet (3,000 m). Between elevations of 9,800 feet (3,000 m) and 12,000 feet (3,700 m) is a subalpine conifer forest consisting mostly of Engelmann spruce, subalpine fir, and limber pine. Quaking aspen is scattered in both the mixed conifer and subalpine forests at elevations from 8,000 feet (2,400 m) to 10,300 feet (3,100 m). Above the treeline at approximately 12,000 feet (3,700 m) is alpine tundra. Grassland and meadows are interspersed with forest at all elevations.

The climate of Vermejo is mostly semi-arid. The lower elevations receive an average of 15 or 16 (400 mm) inches of precipitation annually, mostly in summer. Middle and higher elevations receive about 22 inches (550 mm) of precipitation annually. Temperatures vary depending upon elevation and slope exposure with a wide range between the lower and higher elevations. Snow accumulation is significant during winter at higher elevations.

== Wildlife ==
Game animals include 6,000 to 8,000 elk, 3,000 to 4,000 mule deer, pronghorn, 1,400 bison, black bear, cougars, Rocky Mountain bighorn sheep and Merriam's turkey (a subspecies of the wild turkey). Game fish include several species of trout including the Rio Grande cutthroat which survives only in a few small streams in its former range.

=== Conservation ===
The black-footed ferret was declared extinct in 1979, but a remnant population was found in Wyoming. In cooperation with the U.S. Fish and Wildlife Service, Vermejo introduced ferrets to the reserve in 2008, with the goal of establishing a population of 120 ferrets. More than 8,000 acres (3,200 ha) of shortgrass prairie on the reserve are occupied by prairie dogs, the chief prey of ferrets.

Vermejo also has an agreement with the Fish and Wildlife Service to help conserve the Rio Grande cutthroat trout in the small headwater streams in which it lives. The Rio Grande cutthroat is declining in numbers and is only found in about 10 percent of its former range. Vermejo is also cooperating with Philmont Scout Ranch in restoring Ponil and Bonito Creeks to conditions in which they can support trout populations

Vermejo is improving the quality of its ponderosa pine forest by selective cutting and controlled burning and encouraging the expansion of declining quaking aspen forests. Research on various factors influencing the wildlife on the property and reclamation of land impacted by abandoned coal mines are on-going projects.

== Infrastructure ==
The Cimarron Solar Facility on 364 acres (147 ha) produces 30 megawatts of electric power, sufficient for 9,000 homes.
