= Valle Vidal =

Mountain basin in Taos County, New Mexico

Coordinates: 36°45′21″N 105°16′12″W

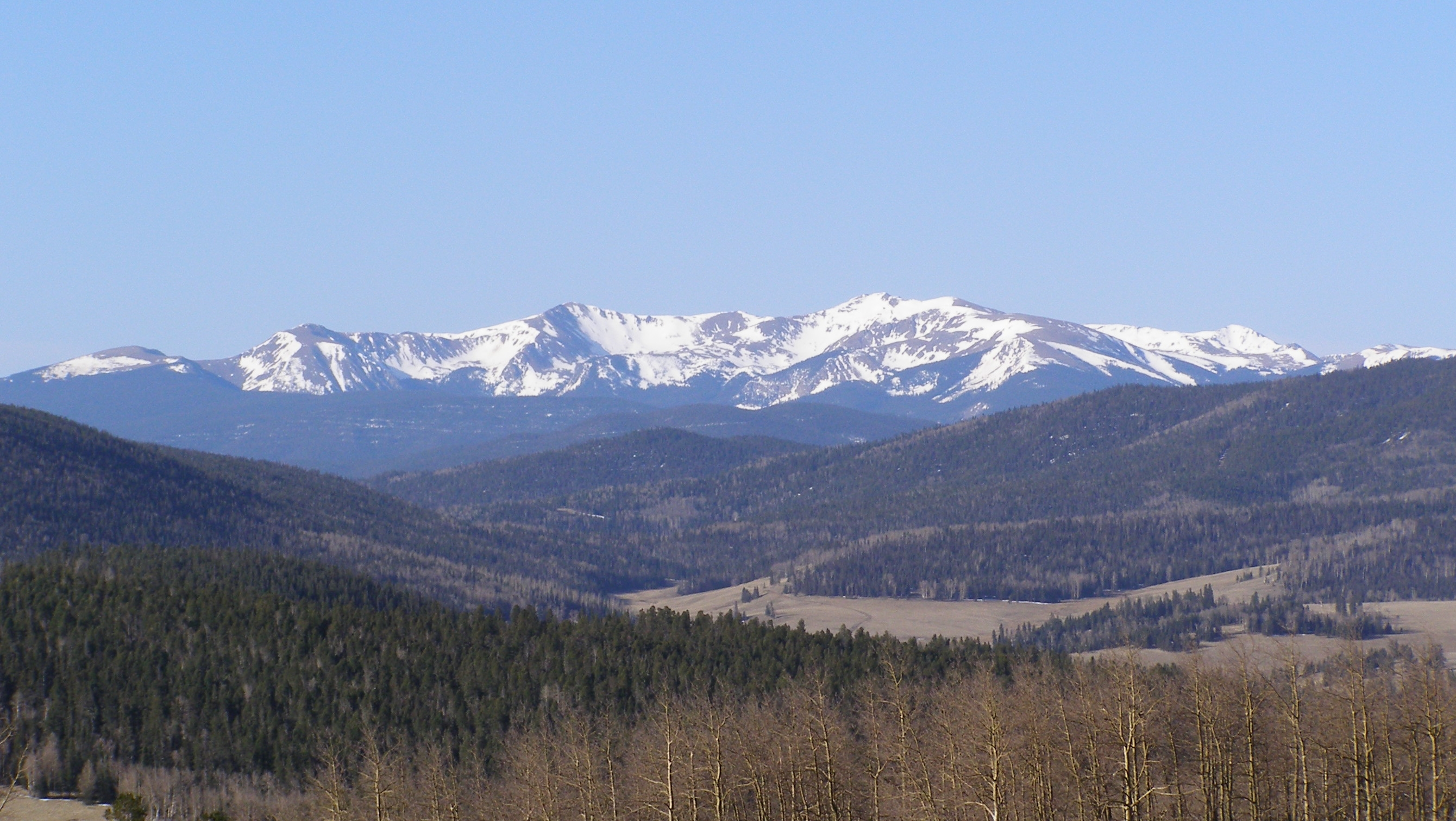
Taos Mountain and Wheeler Peak, viewed from Valle Vidal

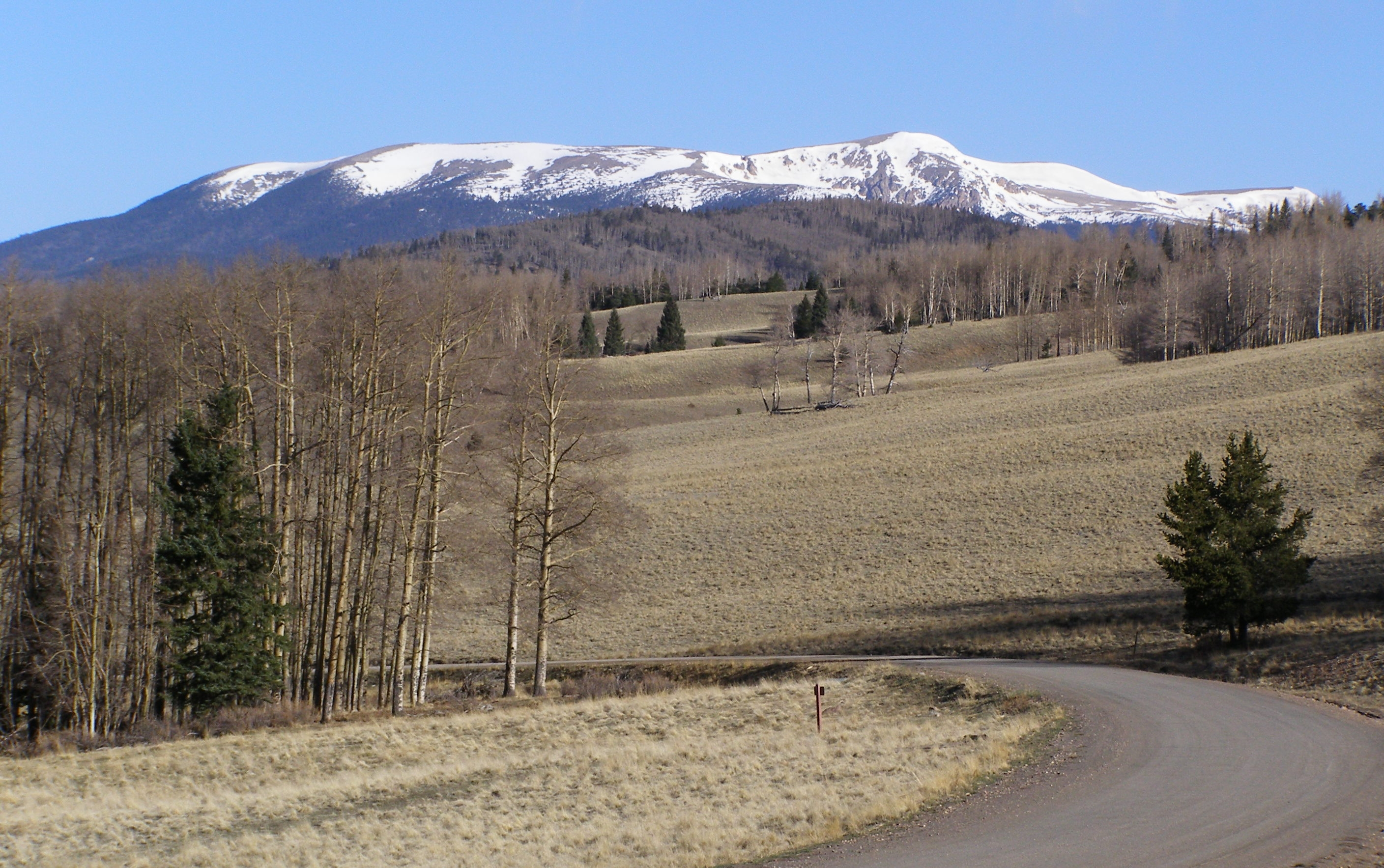
Big Costilla Peak from Valle Vidal, April 2006

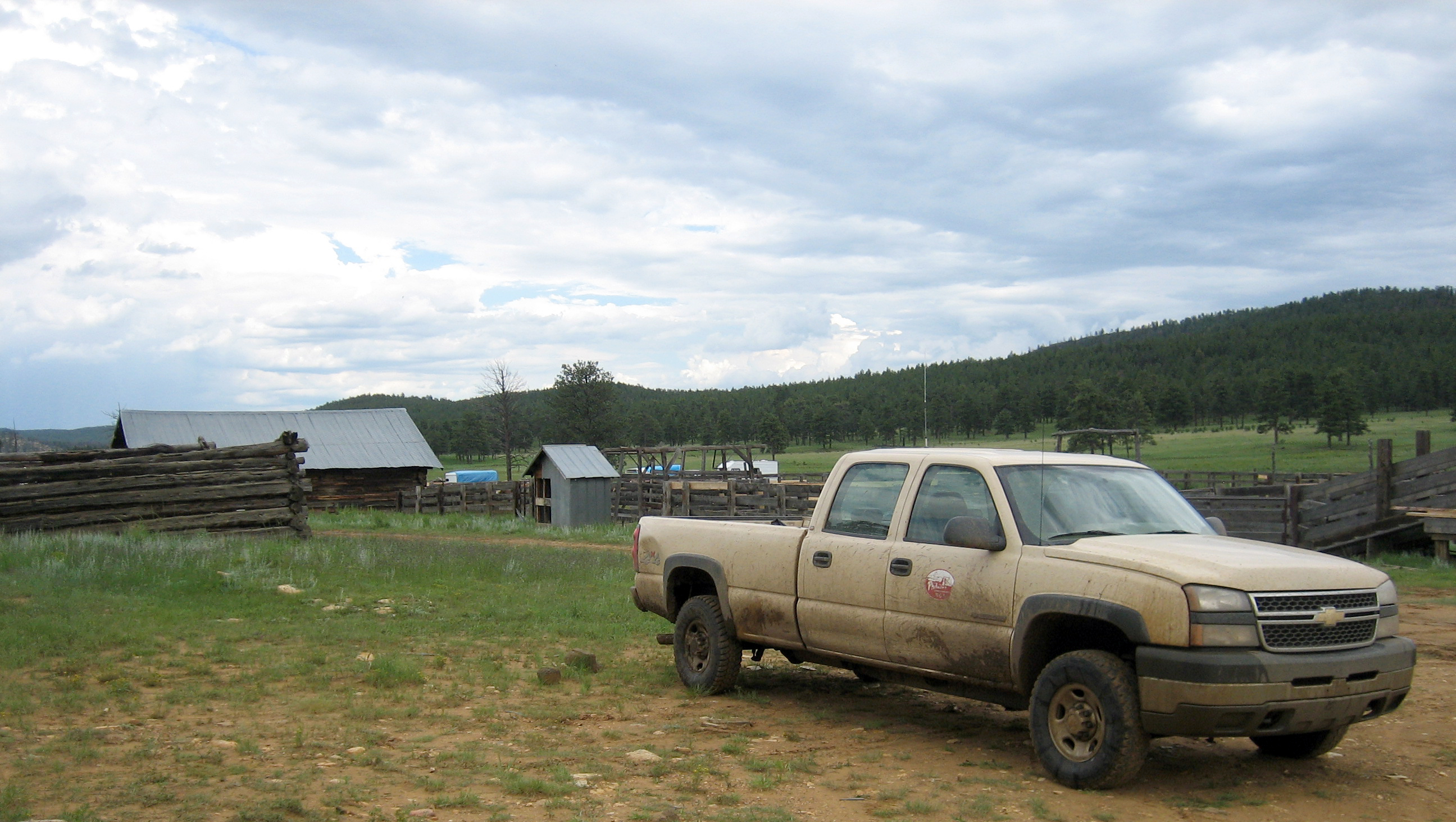
A Philmont vehicle parked at Ring Place, one of the three BSA-operated camps in the Valle.

The Valle Vidal (Spanish, "Valley of Life") is a 101,794 acres (41,195 ha) mountain basin in the Sangre de Cristo Mountains within the Carson National Forest, northwest of Cimarron, New Mexico. Elevations in the basin range from 7,700 to 12,554 feet (2,347 to 3,826 m). Valle Vidal is noted for its pristine scenery and wildlife. It was protected from oil and gas exploration by an act of Congress in 2006. The Valle Vidal borders on Vermejo Reserve, Philmont Scout Ranch, and other private lands.

== History ==
Valle Vidal was part of the Maxwell Land Grant until purchased by William Bartlett in 1902. Part of the Vermejo Park Ranch, Valle Vidal became a hunting and fishing preserve for wealthy people and celebrities. In 1973, the Vermejo Park Ranch was sold to the Vermejo Park Corporation, a subsidiary of the Pennzoil company. In 1982, Pennzoil donated the Valle Vidal portion of the ranch to the American public and it became part of the Carson National Forest.

In 2002 the El Paso Corporation petitioned the United States Forest Service for the lease of 40,000 acres (16,000 ha) in the eastern part of Valle Vidal to develop coalbed methane resources, and for extension of the company's coalbed methane production on the Vermejo Park Ranch. The Forest Service declined to reject El Paso's petition despite widespread public opposition to the project. The Coalition for the Valle Vidal was created to oppose mineral leasing and in 2006 the U.S. Congress adopted legislation to prohibit mineral development in the Valle Vidal.

== Description ==
At the heart of Valle Vidal are extensive rolling grass-covered meadows at an elevation of about 9,500 feet (2,900 m). The meadows are surrounded by conifer and quaking aspen forests. The land generally increases in elevation from east to west, culminating in Little Costilla Mountain which rises above timberline. The headwaters of Ponil Creek and Comanche Creek, are in Valle Vidal.

Valle Vidal hosts a herd of about 2,500 elk and other species such black bear, turkey, bobcat, and bison. The bison wander into the valley from Vermejo Park Ranch which has a large free-ranging herd. Comanche Creek, a tributary of Costilla Creek and ultimately the Rio Grande, has a population of rare Rio Grande cutthroat trout.

== Recreation ==
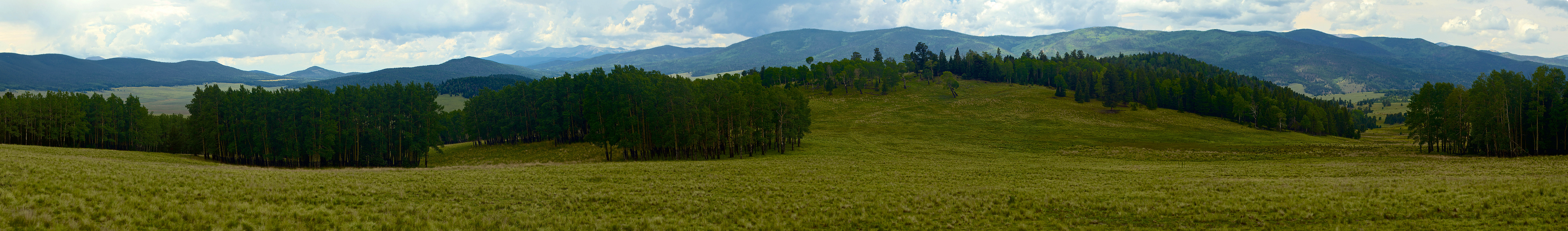
Valle Vidal

The primary use of Valle Vidal is recreation, hosting outfitters, hunting and trekking guides, backpackers, horseback riders, and fly-fishermen. It contributes $3–5 million every year to local economies supporting dozens of jobs and local industries. New Mexico road 1950 traverses Valle Vidal from east to west.

Cimarron campground has been selected by the Great Outdoor Recreation Pages (GORP) as one of the 10 best campgrounds in the United States. Nearby Shuree ponds offer trout fishing opportunities to children under 12 years of age. Eight miles east of Cimarron is McCrystal Campground. Located in a ponderosa pine forest at the lower elevations of Valle Vidal are several abandoned homesites. Philmont Scout Ranch operates three temporary staffed camps in Valle Vidal. Three thousand Boy Scouts backpack in Valle Vidal each summer.

Valle's Vidal's waters were designated as Outstanding National Resource Waters in December 2005 and McCrystal Creek and North Ponil Creek are eligible for designation as Wild and Scenic Rivers. Most fishing in Valle Vidal is catch and release. Trout in the streams are small but abundant. Elk hunting permits are issued by lottery. To protect wildlife populations the east side of the Valle Vidal is closed from January 1 to March 31 and the west side is closed from May 1 to June 30. When there is a closure on either side of the unit, you may drive through the whole unit. You cannot get out and hike on the side where the closure is in effect.
