= Guadalupe Miranda =

Mexican politician (1810–1888)

- Born: 1810; El Paso del Norte (now Ciudad Juárez), Mexico
- Died: February 20, 1888 (aged 77–78)
- Occupation: Mexican Politician
- Known for: Mayor of Ciudad Juárez, Maxwell Land Grant

Guadalupe Miranda (1810-1888) was a Mexican public official who was mayor of Ciudad Juárez and recipient of the 1,700,000-acre (6,900 km^{2}) Beaubien-Miranda Land Grant.

== Early life ==
Guadalupe de Miranda was born in Ciudad Juárez (then called El Paso del Norte). His father was Spanish and his Mother was Mexican/Hispano. He attended school in Chihuahua, Chihuahua.

In 1829, he moved to Santa Fe, New Mexico, where he opened a school.

In 1833, he returned to Juárez but moved back to Santa Fe in 1838.

On April 10, 1839, he was named Secretary of the Territory, Collector of Customs and Captain of Militia.

--- Following facts provided by John Garcia, History Teacher:---

In Josiah Gregg's book Commerce on the Prairies, Guadalupe Miranda is mentioned only one time (surprisingly) in Chapter Five as the New Mexican official who provided Josiah with archival records from Santa Fe pertaining to information about Don Juan de Onate's first settlement in New Mexico. (Gregg, Commerce on the Prairies, Max Moorhead Editor 1954)

In 1837, during the "Rebellion of Rio Arriba" (AKA "Chimayo Rebellion"), Guadalupe Miranda, Josiah Gregg (Author of Commerce on the Prairies), and Juan Garcia (de Noriega?) left Santa Fe together and were the first to report (testify, actually) to Lieutenant Colonel Don Cayetano Justiniani in El Paso on August 28, 1837, about the uprising, including how they believe Native Americans and Mexicans in Taos, incited by American Sympathizers, Texan Sympathizers, and Padre Antonio Martinez, were the parties responsible for rebelling. (LaCompte, Rebellion in Rio Arriba, 1985)

Guadalupe Miranda's activities during the Civil War and Lincoln County War remain highly elusive.

Three Things are certain, though: 1) He resided close by to the Armijo Family in Lemitar New Mexico. (On a side note, Manuel Armijo's son in Lemitar actively provided a large amount of supplies and money for the confederates during the Civil War.) 2) Fort Sumner, where Billy the Kid was shot, was owned by the grandson of Charles Beaubien, Miranda's former Maxwell Land Grant Partner. 3) Miranda continually referred to himself on Census Records as a "Merchant" or "Retired Merchant" even though few records of any business ventures, in the U.S. or in Mexico, exist and despite clearly working primarily as an extremely active public official in Santa Fe, El Paso, and Mesilla during his life.

Lastly, little information exists detailing Guadalupe Miranda's business or personal relationship with the American Fur Traders of Taos and Santa Fe, especially those Trappers/Freighters employed by a) Charles Bent and Ceran St. Vrain, b) Bernard Pratte and Company, and c) the American Fur Company. All three American trading outfits are secretly the same company under the administrative control of one St. Louis, Missouri family led by Pierre Chouteau Jr. and his brother-in-law Bartholomew Berthold (Bertola). (Lavender, The Fist in the Wilderness, 1964; Christian, Before Lewis and Clark, 2004)

Using current research, Miranda must have at least known Kit Carson, who entered Santa Fe in 1826. Kit also worked directly with Lucien B. Maxwell and built his home on the Maxwell Land Grant (which was land that was originally half owned by Miranda.) Miranda had to have known also Alexander Bertoldo (or Berthold), an 1870 Mesilla New Mexico School teacher and 1851 Socorro Texas Judge, who entered into Santa Fe in 1831. Miranda, Carson, and Bertoldo were each 21 years old during the busy 1831 Freighting year in Santa Fe. (UNM Passport Archives) Through research it is clear that Carson, Bertoldo, and Miranda rose up during key times to prevent major injustices from harming or severely displacing the region's Mexican-American population.

Miranda's Business and Personal connections with the Mexican Capitalistas of New Mexico (i.e. Chavez's, Baca's, Perea's, Ochoa's, Aguirre's, Pino's, Armijo's) must be brought to light and examined. (Calafate Boyle, Los Capitalistas, 1997)

More research must also be uncovered to find out what personal and business relationship Guadalupe Miranda had with Gertrudes Barceló, AKA "Dona Las Tules", who from 1832 to 1852 became New Mexico's Wealthiest Woman through gambling and entertainment facilities in Santa Fe. (Gonzalez, Refusing the Favor, 1999)

There is a possibility that Guadalupe Miranda is related to revolutionary Francisco de Miranda.

== Beaubien-Miranda Land Grant ==
On January 11, 1841, Governor Manuel Armijo awarded him and Charles H. Beaubien a 1,700,000-acre (6,900 km^{2}) land grant in eastern New Mexico on the yet to be surveyed Texas border with a provision that the land be settled within two years.

Settlement was delayed by Indian attacks and other Texas invasions and agitation from Taos, New Mexico priest Antonio José Martínez who objected to non-Mexicans receiving land grants (Beaubien was from Canada although he had sworn allegiance to Mexico). Martínez was further enraged when Miranda and Beaubien gave a quarter interest in the grant to American Charles Bent.

During the ill-fated Texas invasion of 1841, he was to intervene to prevent rioters from attacking American interests in Taos. He was awarded a Cross of Honor for his actions in the conflict (in which the Texans had surrendered without firing a shot).

He left Taos in 1845 after never having lived on his land grants.

== Ciudad Juárez Alcalde ==
The Treaty of Guadalupe Hidalgo of 1848 which ended the U.S.-Mexican War was to recognize the legitimacy of his grant. Miranda became alcalde (mayor) of Juárez.

In 1853 he was appointed Commissioner of Emigration to help Mexican citizens relocate from New Mexico including the movement to Mesilla, New Mexico, which was then in Mexico, replacing Father Ramón Ortiz. He was to help many Mexican residents secure grants. Much of the land where the Mexicans had moved was to be turned over to the United States in 1853 in the Gadsden Purchase. He was to lose his own ranch after losing the paperwork. In 1858 he sold his share of the Beaubien-Miranda grant for $2,745 to Lucien Maxwell. In 1874 he moved back to Chihuahua. He was to testify in various land grant cases.

Guadalupe Miranda died 20 February, 1888.
