= Baldy Town, New Mexico =

Mining Ghost Town

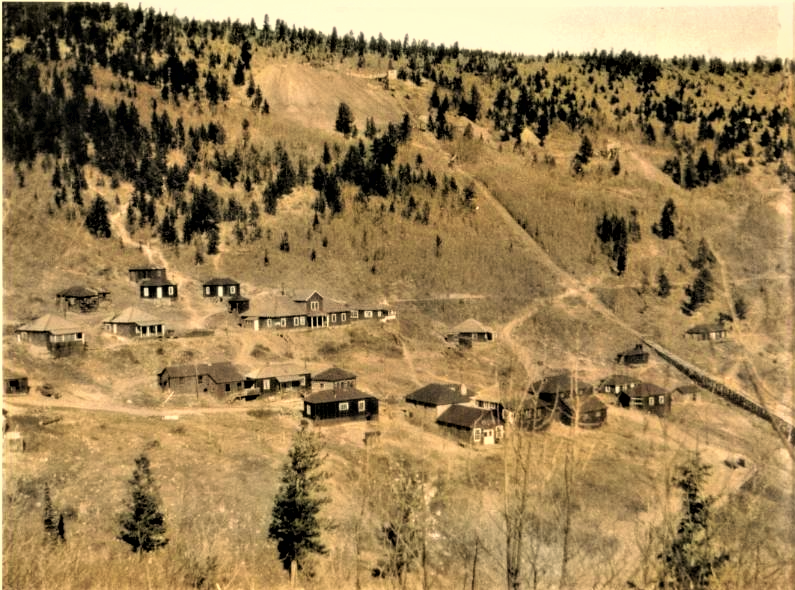
- View of Baldy Town c. 1916

- Location in The New Mexico
- Coordinates: 36°37′26.3166″N 105°10′18.9726″W
- Country: United States
- State: New Mexico
- County: Colfax
- Established: 1868

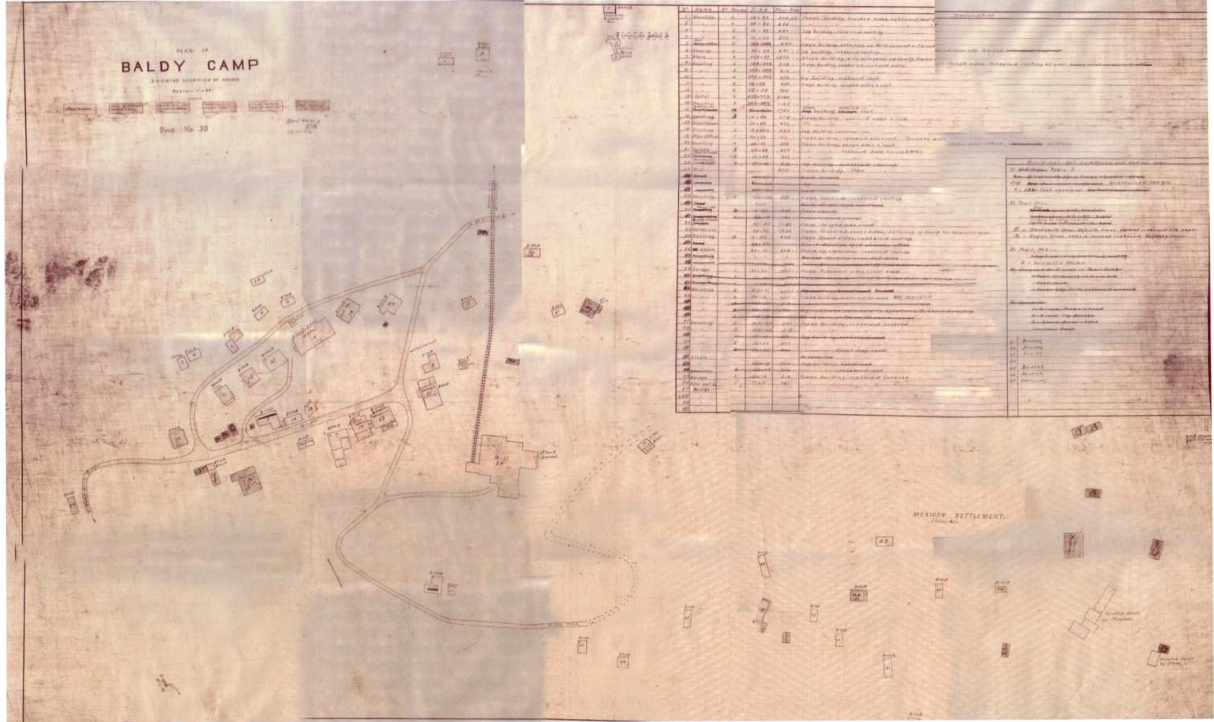
Map of Baldy Town, New Mexico, 1921–1938

Baldy Town, New Mexico is a former mining town in the Baldy Mining District in Colfax County, New Mexico. Baldy Town was established in 1868 to service mining prospects on the East side of Baldy Mountain, notably the Aztec Mine. After Baldy Town's initial boom from 1868 to 1870, Baldy Town suffered a series of booms and busts as investors and prospectors searched for profitable lodes. The town was originally a conglomerate of miner's homes and services in Ute Meadow. Then in 1894, Baldy Town's core was moved to a strip of services just above the Aztec Mill. The new town grew to accommodate hundreds of residents with a store, stables, saloons, boarding houses, a church, a small school, and post office. It's likely that Baldy Town had its largest population right after its boom in 1867, as bachelor prospectors lived in temporary housing. However, the largest official census taken at Baldy Town showed a population of 263 people in 1920. Multiple ambitious and extensive expeditions were made from 1870 to 1936 to discover additional gold veins, but only a select few found substantial lodes. By 1941, Baldy Town had been deserted and a majority of its infrastructure sold. In 1963, the eastern half of Baldy Mountain, including former Baldy Town, was donated to the Boy Scouts of America by Norton Clapp. Today, Baldy Town operates as a staffed camp at Philmont Scout Ranch providing a Metallurgical assay program regarding mining as well as logistical support like food resupply for hikers

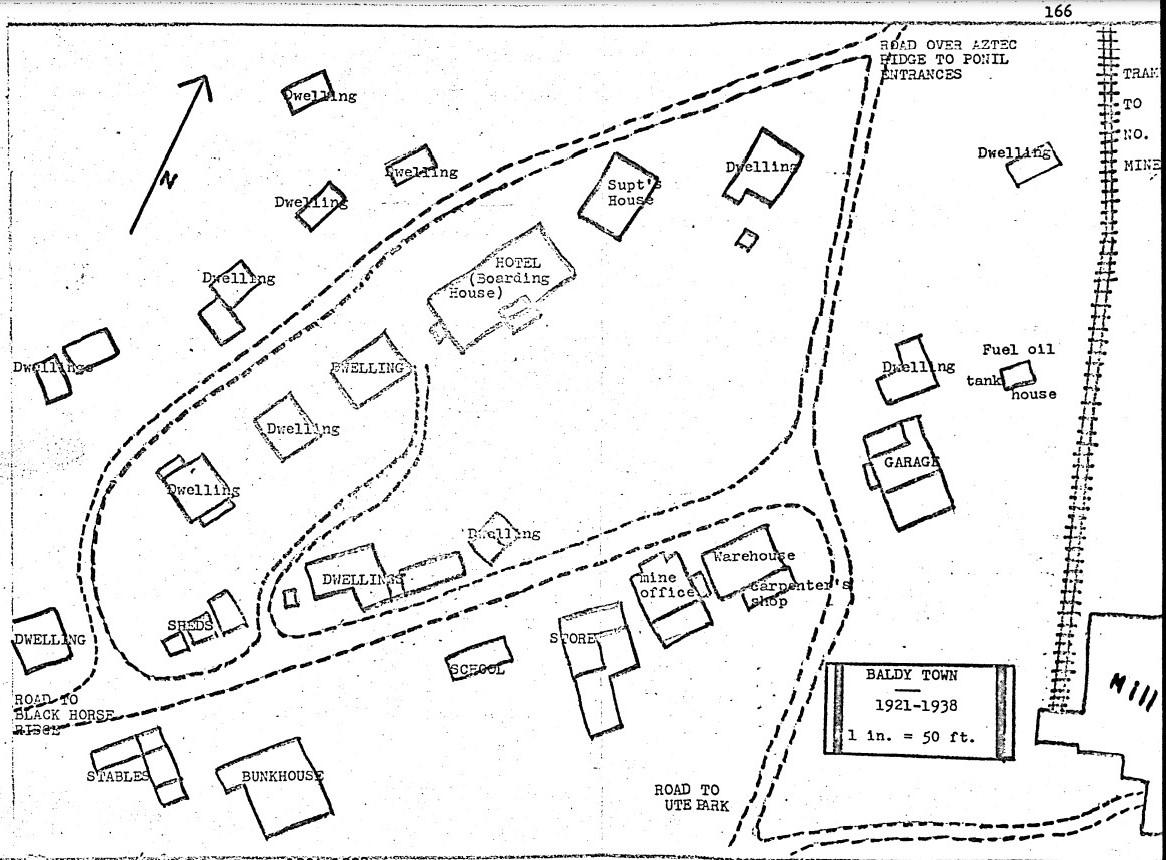
Simplified map of Baldy Town from 1921 to 1938

== Founding ==
In 1866, Union Soldiers garrisoned at Fort Union were approached by indigenous traders (likely from the Jicarilla Apache or Ute, who had float copper. Upon investigation, multiple teams of prospectors left the Fort in search of the copper. Prospectors found the float copper most evident in out-croppings near the peak. They then created prospects for the first mine on Baldy Mountain; the Mystic Lode Mine.

In October 1867, Larry Bronson, Pete Kisinger, and a man named Kelly set out on Baldy Mountain in order to prepare copper ore for shipment. While there, Kelly found gold flakes in the Willow Creek. The trio quickly ceased all plans and got to work panning. To their dismay, however, 3 men can do little to extract much gold in the remote wilderness in a freezing climate. As such they returned to Fort Union for the winter. Despite a promise of secrecy, rumors of Gold on Baldy Mountain danced around the fort. By the Spring of 1868, hundreds flocked to the Moreno Valley in Search of their fortune. This boom coincided with the recent bust on Pikes Peak, likely adding to the sudden influx of prospectors to the region.

Elizabethtown or E-Town was established in 1866 to service claims on the east side of Baldy Mountain. The town's position in the Moreno valley was advantageous for water supply and transportation, but was too far to service claims on the east side of Baldy Mountain. To minimize transportation of ore, Lucien Maxwell created a 15 Stamp Mill to process gold ore directly below the Aztec Mine. Baldy Town began a series of dwellings and services adjacent to the mill and grew into a small town.

== Growth and Infrastructure ==
=== Old Baldy / Little Chihuahua ===
Baldy Town originated from a collection of miner's houses in the area between Ute Meadows and the Mill. In 1894, an English company, The Aztec Mining & Milling Co., came under control of the Aztec Mine claim. With renewed investment from the company, new residences, stores, and saloons were built in the area above the mill. As the economic center of the town shifted above the mill, the remaining community below the mill slowly became a segregated community of Hispanic miners who primarily worked within the Aztec. This community was called multiple names including "Old Baldy Town", "Little Chihuahua", and simply "the Mexican settlements". As a result of processing ore with chemicals such as Mercury and Cyanide, the water traveling below the Aztec mill was polluted. The segregation of residential spaces, where Mexicans lived below the mill, spoke to racism and xenophobia in the early 20th century.

=== Aztec Mill and Tramway ===
In 1868, Lucien Maxwell invested in a $8,000 15-stamp mill and 12 horse power steam engine built below the Aztec mine to service the same. Ore was moved from the mine to the mill by burro originally. The same year, an arial tramway was installed to transport ore easier. Then in 1885, the mill was replaced by a 30 stamp mill by the Aztec mining and Milling Co. In 1921, The arial tramway was replaced with simple track and the mill was updated. In 1934, as an effort to process small rich deposits quickly, the mill was replaced by a ball mill. This mill continued to process small ore and remill tailings until its decommission in 1940.

=== The Big Ditch ===
The Big Ditch was a water infrastructure project which brought water from the head of the Red River, 41 miles (66 km) to the West side of Baldy Mountain above Willow Creek. The project was an engineering marvel of its time which was designed for 700 miner inches of water or 7.65 million gallons (29 million liters) of water to be transported per day. The project cost $200,000. Ultimately, the Big Ditch only transported 100 miner inches of water due to leakage. While it did improve water conditions, it never satisficed all the needs of placer mining and the investment of promoters.

The Company then tapped the waters of the South Ponil creek and created a pool below the mill on the New Orleans flat to provide additional water for placer mining on the West slopes of Baldy.

=== Town Core ===
Businesses grew above the mill around 1688. The Aztec Mining and Milling Company moved their offices above the mill in 1894, and the town's core with it. The town then grew from 1894 to 1897, with investment from the Maxwell Company. The town experienced a second revitalization between 1913 and 1917, with the discovery of additional ore veins. In 1940, after the closure of the mill, company property - machinery, materials, and rail - were sold. Residents of the town took what property they could and left the rest. Homes and buildings were left to slowly decay. The disappearance of the town was accelerated by unchecked fires and storm damage. In 1965, The Boy Scouts of America destroyed the general store, the last original building, as a safety concern.

== Local Mines Baldy Town Serviced ==
=== Aztec Mine ===
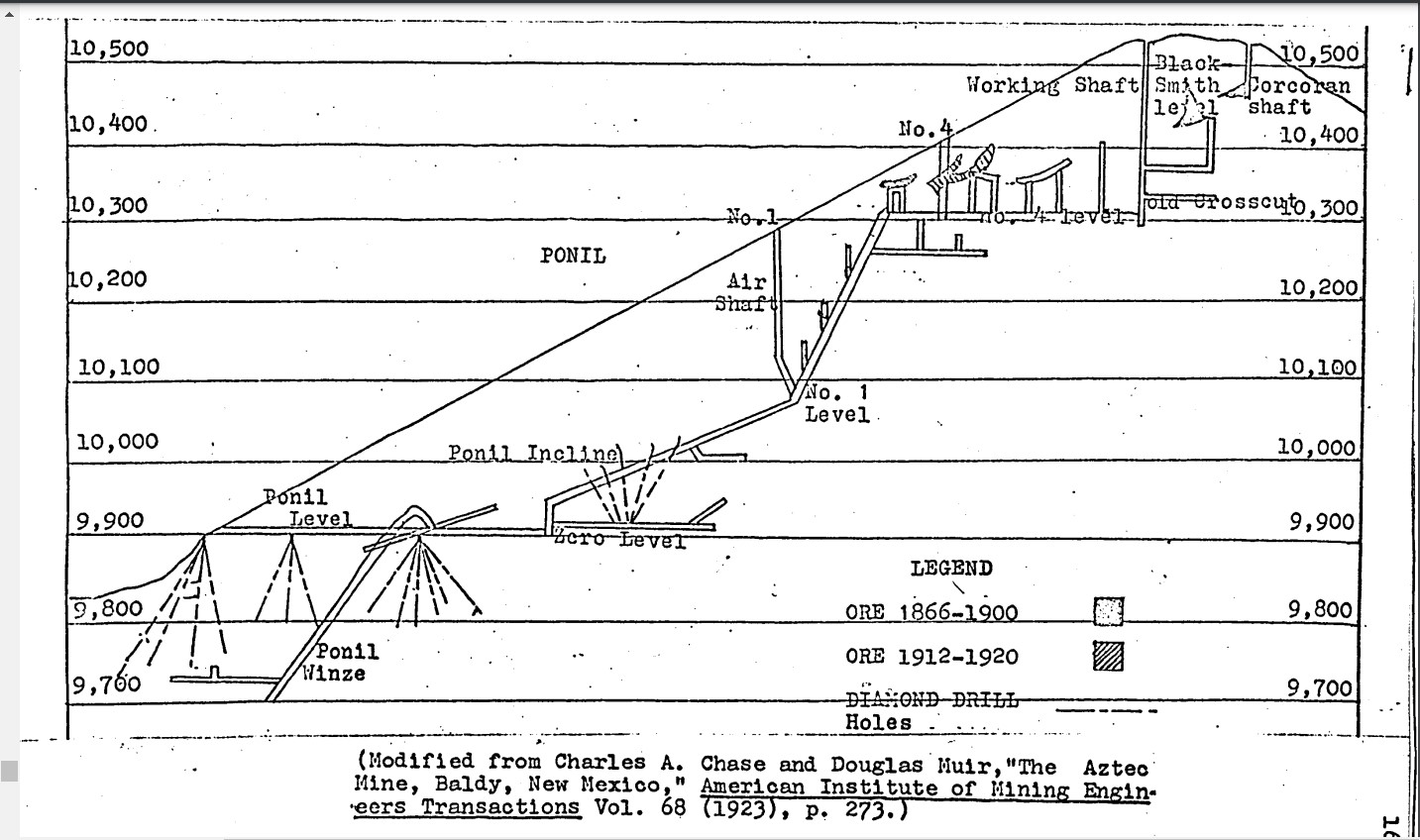
Section of the Aztec Mine System

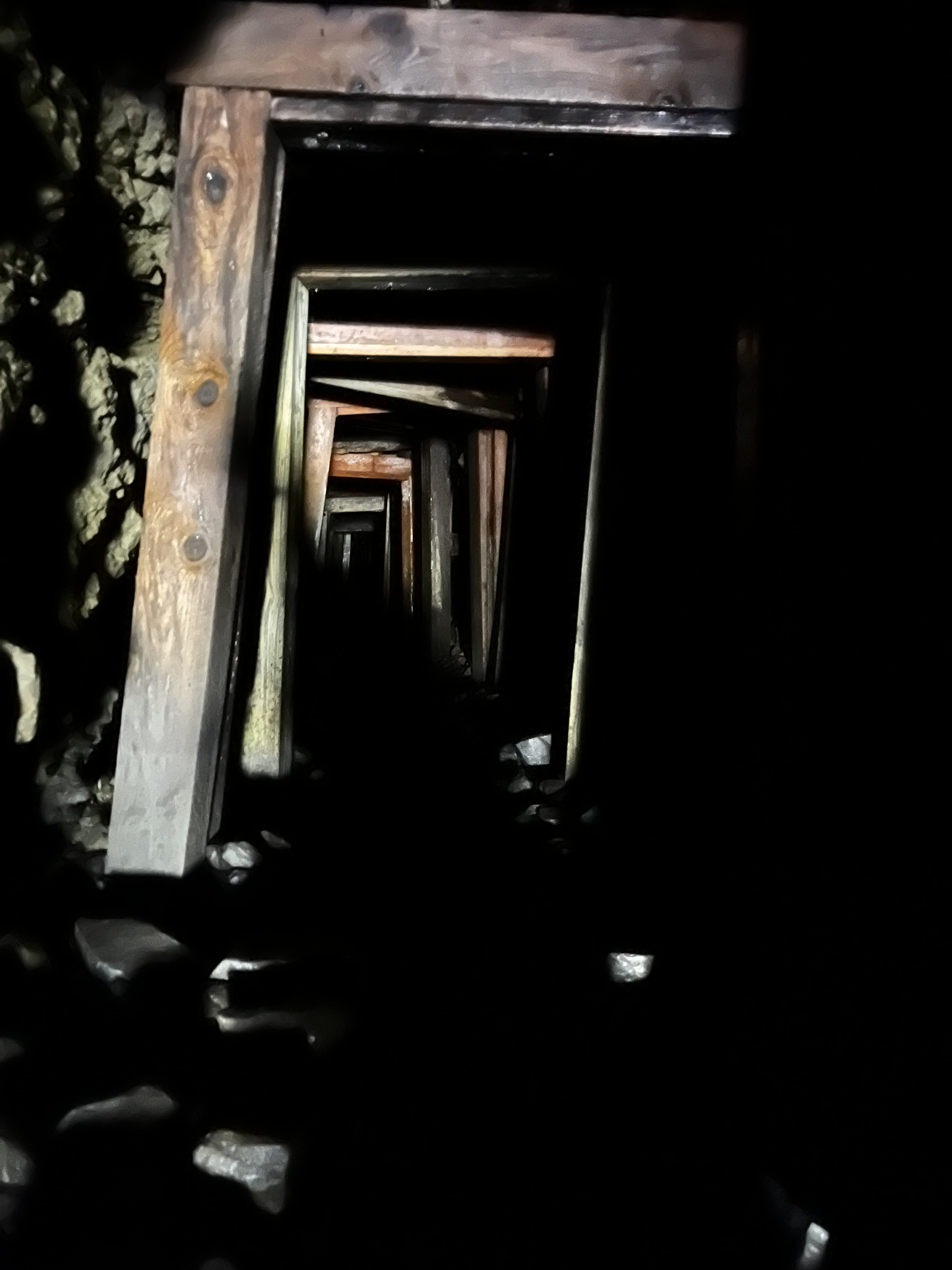
Photo within the Aztec-Ponil #2

AKA: Aztec-Ponil, Aztec Reservation, Azurite, Aztec Extension

The Aztec Mine was the primary producer of gold bullion on the east side of Baldy Mountain. In 1868, three rich veins of gold-infused quartz were discovered between the Ute and South Ponil Creeks. Lucien Maxwell and fellow promoters filed for the claim and invested in an expensive 15-stamp mill below the mine. The mine proved very profitable, the richest deposit in the Baldy Mining District.

The Aztec was worked until 1879, when there was litigation between the owners on how the mine should be developed. Frank Springer attempted to reopen the Aztec in 1881, and Baldy Town grew to support his operations and investment in the mine. Springer's investments proved unprofitable and the Aztec Mine ceased operating by the 1890s.

In 1914, Geologist Ernhest V. Deshayes drilled 300 feet (91.4 meters) below the original Aztec discovering a new rich lode of gold. The renewed mining of the Aztec briefly revitalizes Baldy Town, bringing hundreds of miners, investment, and infrastructure. In 1915 and early 1916, Baldy Town was one of the largest towns in the region. By late 1916, however, the Aztec mine once again ran dry and hundreds vacated in search of other opportunities.

The Aztec produced a majority of the bullion from the Baldy Mining District, upwards of $2 million over its lifetime.

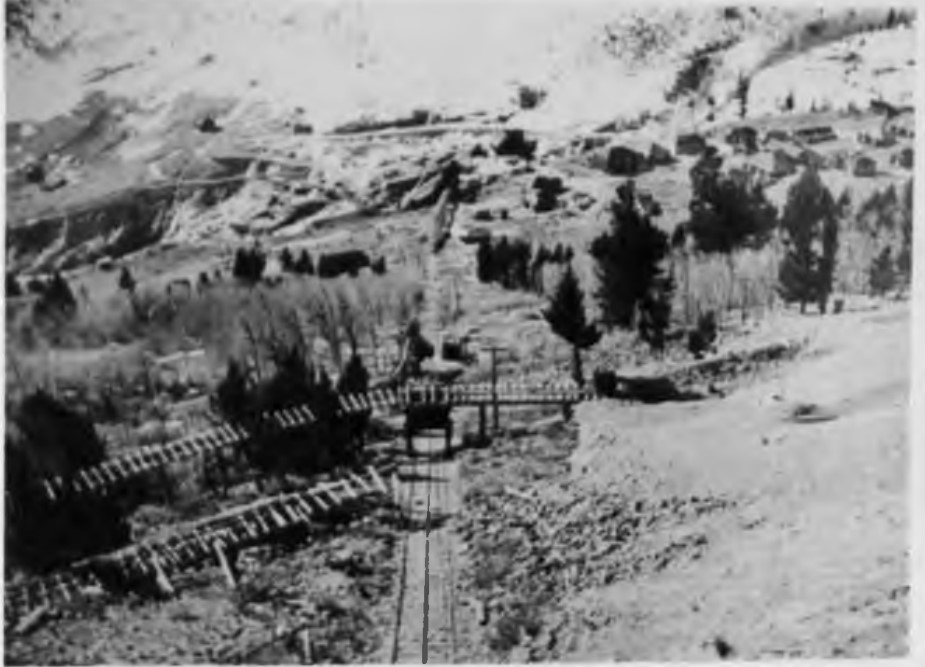
View of Baldy Town from the Aztec Mine Tramway

==== Montezuma ====
Struck in 1869 by "Big Jack", the Montezuma mine sat directly south of the Aztec. A 30-stamp mill was created to process the mine's ore. The Montezuma was nearly as profitable as the Aztec, netting $1,000 a day in 1869. The Montezuma followed the Aztec's situation and was discontinued in the early 20th century.

==== French Henry ====
In 1870, a group of French miners under Henry Buruel began mining on what is now called French Henry Ridge, north of Baldy Town. The mine had a 60’ shaft and a rich ore deposit. Buruel, however did not have the means of processing said ore since Baldy Town's major mills were owned by Maxwell and refused to process his ore. The mine closed soon after.

==== Deep Tunnel ====
Brothers Alexander T. and William P. McIntyre began plans in 1898 to bore a tunnel deep into Baldy Mountain in search of a legendary lode of gold. In 1900, they began to mine on the west side of Baldy Mountain, extracting sparse veins of gold and copper. The McIntyres were able to reach significant depth, but did not find a significant deposit of gold. With no profit to show by 1908 most promoters of the mine withdrew their investment. The McIntyres continued to bore a tunnel from the west and east ends of Baldy Mountain which finally met in 1936. The Deep Tunnel's completion and unprofitability was emblematic of the end of Baldy Town's relevance.

==== Black Horse ====
John Kempt founded the Black Horse, south of the Aztec, in 1871. The mine was moved in 1880, under the Four Creeks Milling Co. The mine proved somewhat profitable, but suffered from lack of investment. Mining operations were sporadic until 1908, when the mine was largely abandoned.

==== Mystic Lode ====
The Mystic was one of the first mines established on Baldy Mountain, struck in 1867 close to the peak of the mountain. Here, gold, quartz, and copper were discovered in pockets. The mine was difficult to profit from due to its location and ore's various mineral composites. The mine changed hands often.

==== Other Mines ====
- Swansea Mine
- Rebel Chief Mine
- American Mine
- Bull-of-the-Woods Mine
- Homestake
- Ajax Mine
- Willow Creek Mine
- Placer Operations on Ute Creek

== Decline ==
After the 1914–1916 Aztec Mine boom, optimists idealized a rich future which never came to fruition. Although Mining Engineers and Company officials attempted various schemes to find higher grade ore in the 1930s, the Aztec mine's profitability was uncertain. In 1926, Baldy Town's post office was discontinued. The completion of the Deep Tunnel mine in 1936 provided a somber reality against the then 70 year old myth that Baldy Mountain held a hidden "motherlode" of gold. Similarly, the Deep Tunnel's completion was a harbinger of the Town's coming decline. The same year, a majority of work at the Aztec Mill was redirected to remilling discarded ore from the Aztec Mine, rather than new ore, which was mildly profitable.

After planning over the winter, company executives sought to retry mining in the Aztec. The Aztec mine re-opened on April 1, 1940 but unexpected costs prevented extensive works. On May 10, 1940, Nazi Germany invaded Holland. For stakeholders at the Dutch-owned Aztec and Milling Company, continuing an unprofitable remote mining operation in a foreign nation was impossible. The company announced that on September 1, 1940, the Aztec Mill would be closed. As the economic driver, job provider, and power plant for Baldy Town, the closure of the mill meant the closure of the town. Within weeks of the mill's closure, the residents of the town had left. After machinery was sold, property was removed, and fires had gone unchecked, Baldy Town lay as a remote ghost town by the end of the decade.

== Baldy Town at Philmont Scout Ranch ==
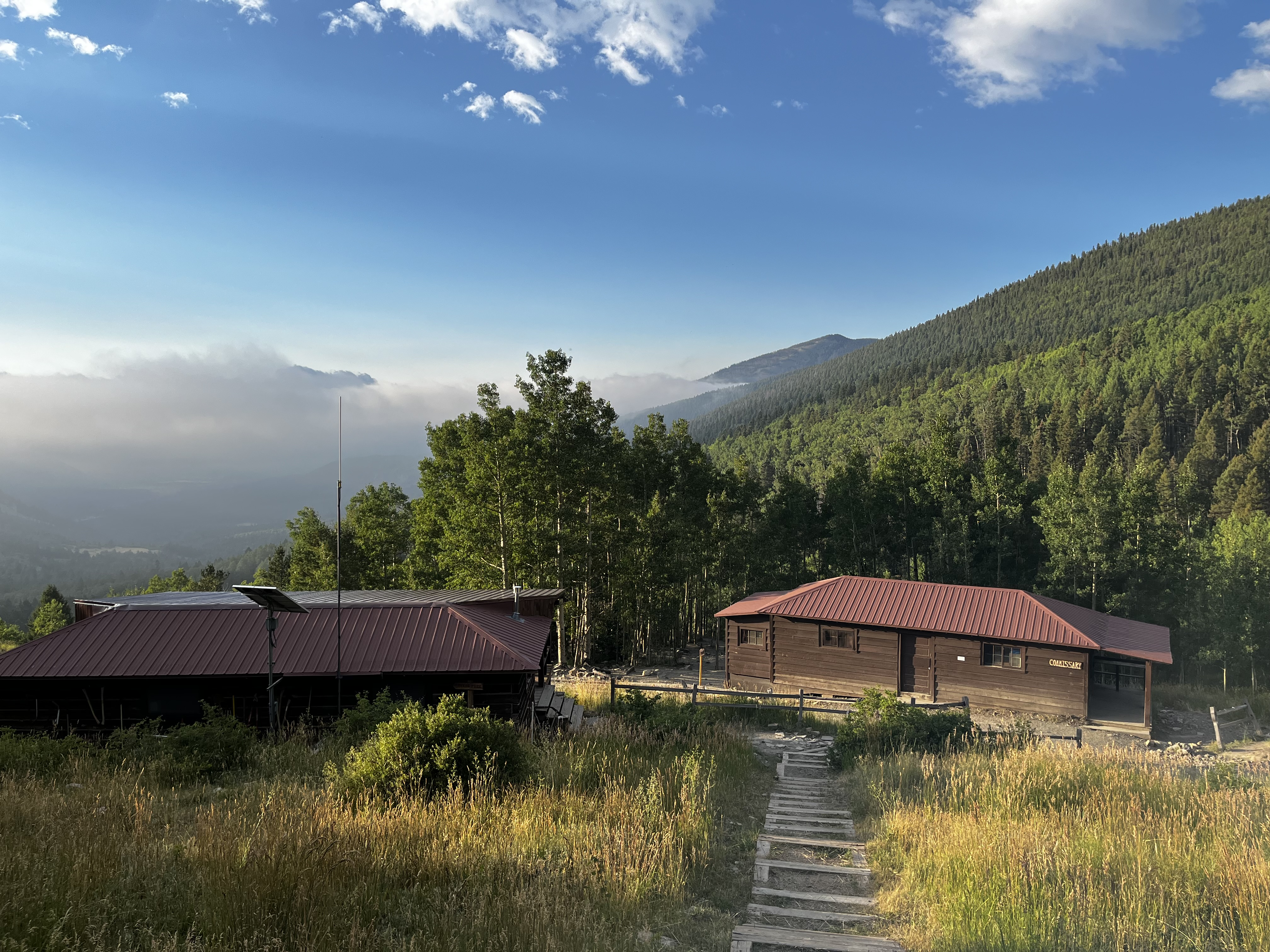
Baldy Town Camp in 2023

10,098 acres (4,086.5 hectares) of land surrounding Baldy Mountain, including Baldy Town, was purchased by Scouting America with a $100,000 donation from then BSA Vice President Norton Clapp in 1963. The land added a considerable portion to the ranch and allowed for treks to access Baldy Mountain, one of the tallest peaks in the Sangre de Cristo Mountains.

Upon inspection, the leadership of the Boy Scouts of America at the time determined it necessary to "clean up" the prior industrial land to make it suitable for scouts to hike through and interact with. This included the demolition of mine portals and the removal of rubble from the town. The last structure at Baldy Town, the original General Store, was a large stone masonry building likely built in the 1890s. The last remnants of the store were demolished in 1967 to prevent possible collapse. Today, many of the foundations of the town can still be seen at or just below ground level.

Today, the town is centered around a large cabin, which was the first structure built by the BSA in 1965. Originally, it was only a modest single room Staff kitchen, until being expanded to include a large porch and museum for displaying artifacts. Opposite the museum, on the site of the town's former school house, is a commissary for distributing food to backpacking scouts. Adjacent to the museum, there is a modest trading post which sells hiking gear built in 1983. Directly north of the ruins of the former Baldy Hotel, Philmont erected a cabin for the staff quarters in 2013.

The road traveling from Baldy Town to Ute Park has been maintained to allow vehicle traffic for logistics. The road connecting Baldy Town to the French Henry/Aztec-Ponil Mining Complex is also continually maintained. Roads and trails connecting Baldy Town to other mines have disappeared over time. All mines, with the exception of a ventilation addit out of the Aztec-Ponil (which is displayed through French Henry's camp program), have been intentionally collapsed or barred for safety. Evidence of mine portals, pit mines, and tailings Ponds are still visible for visitors to see as they hike up Baldy Mountain.

Scouts who stop at Baldy Town are introduced to mining, geology, prospecting, and Gold Assaying. The current facilities can support more than 250 participants, 10 staff members, and a visiting geologist. There are showers, as well as a trading post and commissary.

== See also ==
- Baldy Mining District
- Philmont Scout Ranch
- Gold Mining
- New Mexico Ghost Towns
- Elizabethtown, New Mexico
- Maxwell Land Grant
- Placer mining
- Processing Gold Ore in the 19th Century
