= French Henry mine =

Gold mine near Cimarron, New Mexico

- Location within New Mexico Location within the United States
- Location: Cimarron,New Mexico,United States; 36°38′24.5″N 105°11′29.5″W
- Discovered: 1869
- Opened: 1870
- Closed: 1938
- Company: Boy Scouts of America

The French Henry mine is a gold and silver mine located on Baldy Mountain (Colfax County, New Mexico). The mine was in operation intermittently from 1870 to 1938. Part of the Baldy Mining District, the mine has changed ownership many times and is now owned by the Boy Scouts of America as a part of Philmont Scout Ranch. The French Henry mine is no longer operational.

== History ==
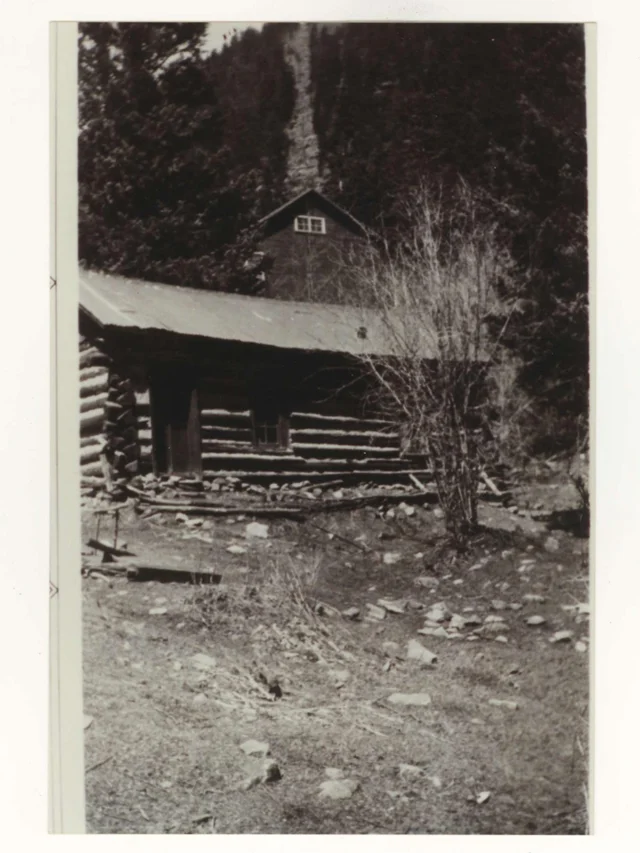
French Henry Lower Cabin ca.(1936)

The French Henry mine was originally discovered in 1869 by a team led by Henry Buruel; the mine's namesake. The deed to the mine was obtained from Lucien Maxwell and mining operations started in 1870. Operations were halted later that same year due to a lack of ability to process the ore. Maxwell's nearby Aztec Mill would not process the ore from the French Henry. Shipping the ore elsewhere to be processed would have been prohibitively expensive.

In 1894, mining started again, this time under the Claude Mining and Milling company. The new owners installed a 15 stamp stamp mill along the South Ponil River with a 2,700 foot aerial tramway running down French Henry ridge.

In 1936, a 50-ton stamp and amalgamation mill was added, and subsequently ran by a man called C.H. Anderson. The mill started processing ore assayed at $80 per ton but the value quickly fell to around $7.50.

In 1937, a group of wealthy men decided to buy the mine. They created The French Henry Mining and Milling Company on July 5, 1938. The new manager was Matt Gorman, a foreman who had worked at the neighboring Aztec Mine. Gorman oversaw the addition of a 50-ton ball crusher along the banks of the South Ponil as well as mechanical separators, to retrieve the gold from the crushed ore, and a few new buildings. When operations began, any high value ore quickly ran out. It was suspected that the mine may have been salted with ore from the Aztec Mine. When the mine was inspected by a now unknown former Arizona Bureau of Mines geologist, the decision was made to shut down after only two months of operations. There seemed to be no ore worth mining and the French Henry ceased operations for the last time. Much of the machinery and equipment was sold as the owners attempted to recoup their investment.

The mine was acquired in 1963 by the Boy Scouts of America.

== Modern use ==
The French Henry is now owned by Philmont Scout Ranch. The mine is no longer operational.

=== Mill site ===
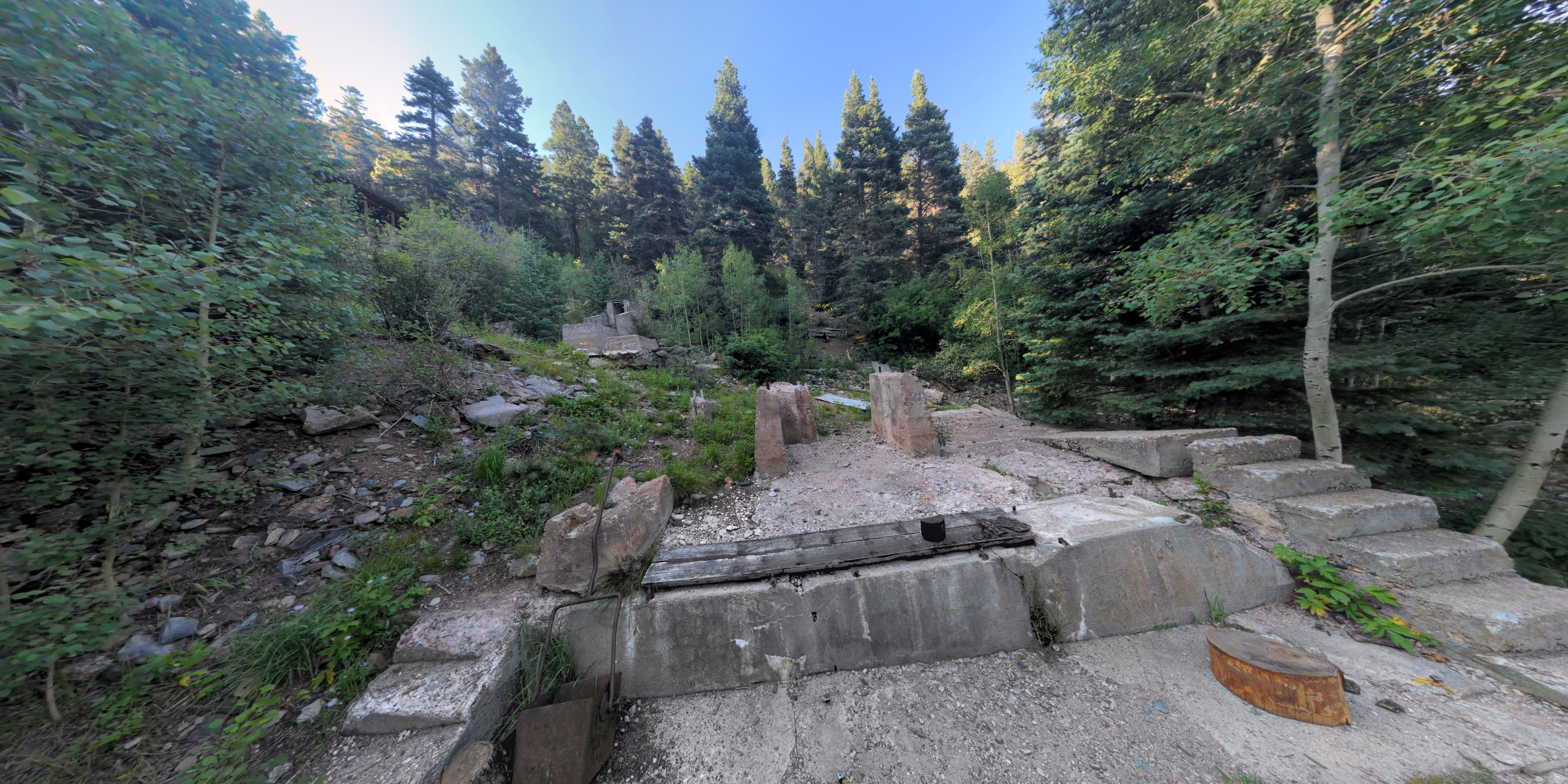
French Henry mill ruins in 2021

The site of the mill(located at 36°38′09.5″N 105°11′05.1″W) is down the ridge from the mine, along the South Ponil River. It is used as a Living history camp for Philmont's summer program. The mill site has three standing log cabins, two were built while the mine was operational and one was added by Philmont. The oldest building now serves as a mining history museum while the other two buildings are used as living quarters for the summer program staff. Small amounts of gold can still be found in the South Ponil River at this site.

=== Mine ===
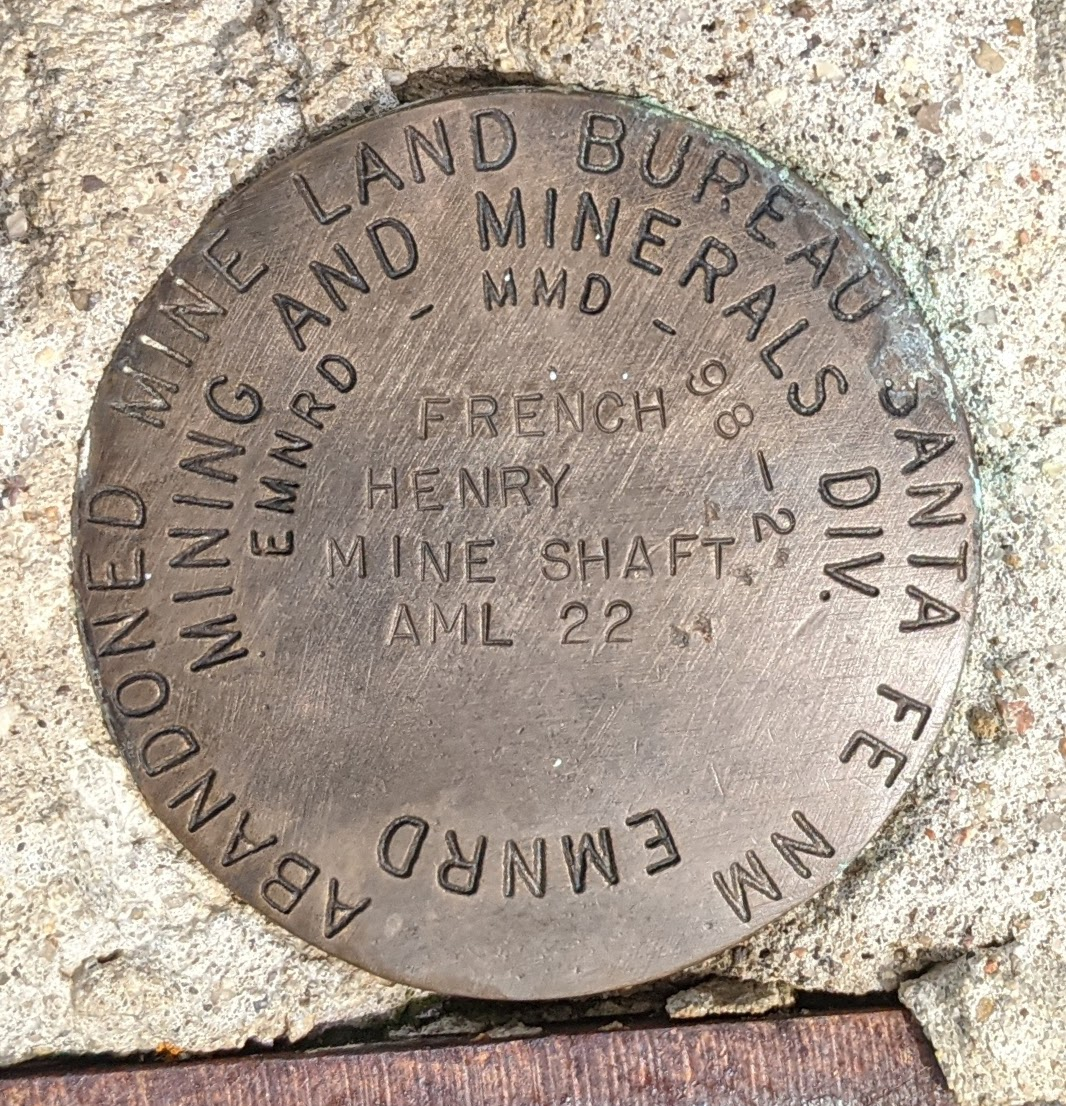
Plaque near the entrance of the French Henry mine

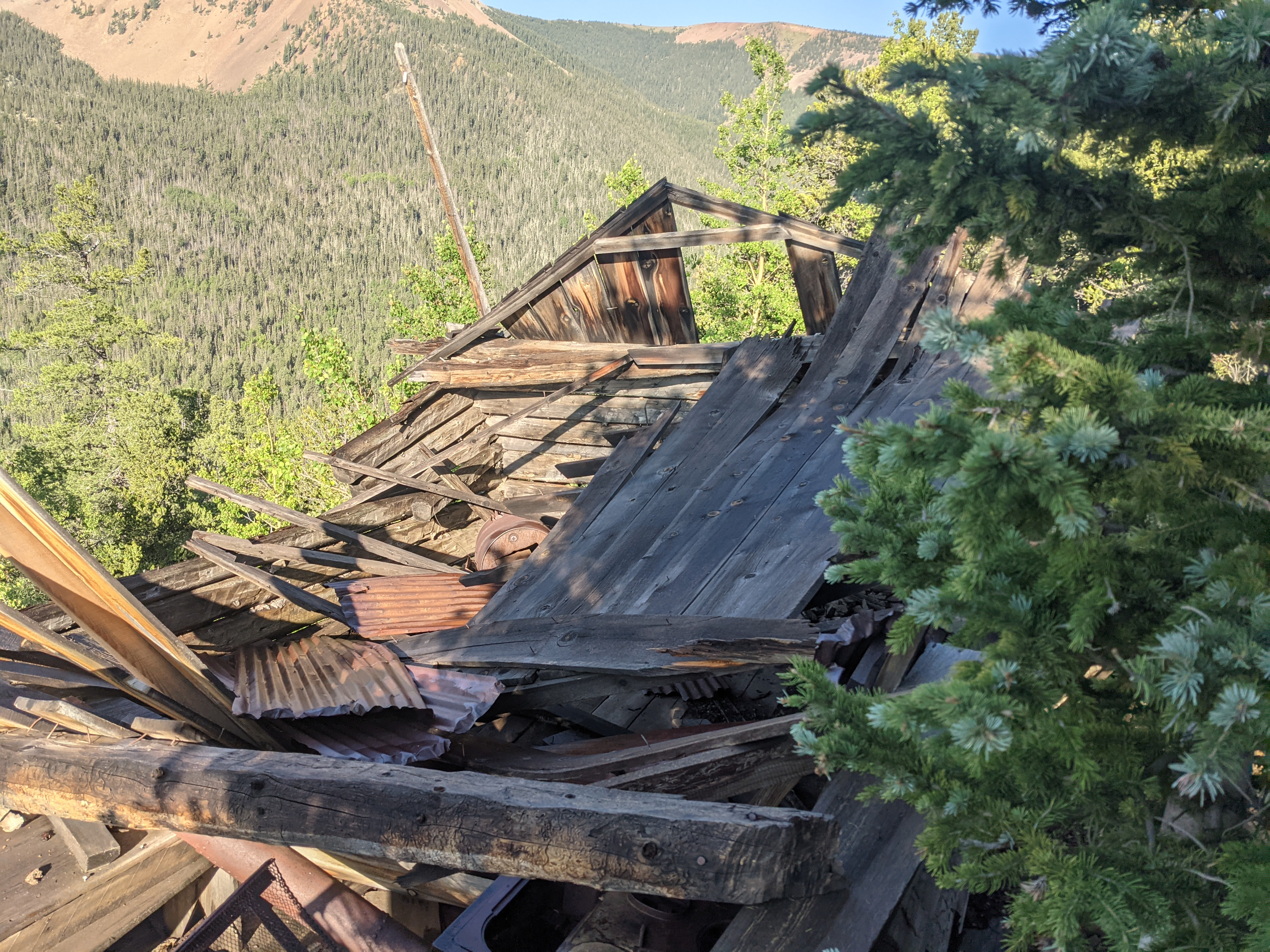
Collapsed cabin at the French Henry mine.

The actual mine is abandoned and access is restricted from both the public and Philmont participants. The buildings and structures are largely collapsed.
