= Baldy Mining District =

Gold mining area in New Mexico, US

Baldy Mining District Elizabethtown Mining District
- District
- Baldy Mining District
- Location within New Mexico
- Coordinates: 36°37′13″N 105°13′46″W
- Country: United States
- State: New Mexico

The Baldy Mining District was one of the largest gold producing districts in New Mexico. Also sometimes known as the Elizabethtown Mining District, it encompasses Baldy Mountain (Colfax County, New Mexico). There is no longer any large scale mining. Most of the land is now owned by the Boy Scouts of America as a part of Philmont Scout Ranch. The Baldy Mining District is approximately 18,247 Acres.

== History ==
Gold was originally found on Baldy Mountain in 1866. Early in the year of 1866, Native Americans (either from the Ute or Jicarilla Apache tribes) found a large deposit of copper bearing ores. They traded these ores with soldiers at Fort Union. With the Civil war over, the soldiers decided that they could mine the copper for profit. One of the Native Americans showed a soldier where they had found the copper, on Baldy Mountain, and the soldier staked a claim. Known as the "Mystic Lode" or just the "Copper Mine", this was the first mine in the Baldy Mining District. In October of that same year, three soldiers from Fort Union, Larry Bronson, Pete Kinsinger, and a soldier called Kelley were sent to the mine to continue work. When the men arrived at the mine, Bronson and Kinsinger cooked a meal while Kelley decided to pan for gold. Kelley found gold in the gravel, showed the others, and they all began searching for more. They spent a few days scouring the slopes for gold. They determined that although this gold was worth pursuing, winter was approaching and mining operations could not continue. They left the mountain with plans to keep the gold a secret and return in the spring. The secret spread within weeks and the gold rush on Baldy had started.

== Towns ==
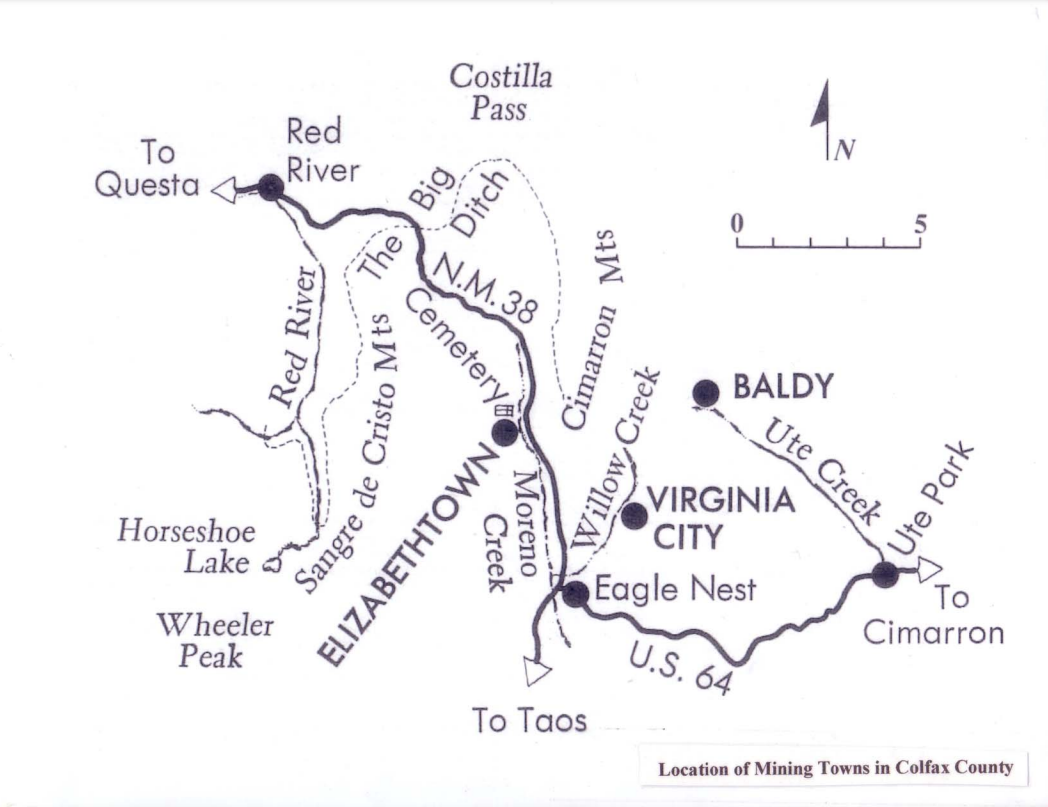
Location of Mining Towns in Colfax County, NM

=== Elizabethtown ===
Main Article: Elizabethtown

Elizabethtown, also known as E-Town, was the first mining town established in the Baldy Mining District. Located at 36°37′09″N 105°17′04″W, it was established in 1866 along with the opening of local mines. Elizabethtown was the first incorporated town in New Mexico and once held the Colfax County seat. Growing and shrinking along with the booms and busts of the Baldy Mining District, the town was mostly abandoned by 1917.

=== Baldy Town ===
Main Article: Baldy Town

Baldy Town (1868-1941) was a small mining town which serviced a majority of operations on the east side of Baldy Mountain.

=== Virginia City ===
In 1868, Lucien Maxwell laid the groundwork for a prominent town in the Moreno Valley which would serve as a hub of trade, transit, communication, supplies, commercial and industrial activity for mining operations in the Baldy Mining District. He named the prospective city after his daughter, Virginia. Although the town had investments, surveys, and plot allocation, it was never populated and abandoned immediately.

== Mines ==
The mines in the Baldy Mining District produced mainly gold, silver, and copper.

Mines in the Baldy Mining District
Mine Name	Alternate Names	Location	Primary Commodity	Description
Alabama				
Ajax		36°36′19.2″N 105°13′46.1″W	Gold	Small production.
Aztec	Aztec Reservation: Claims, Aztec, Azurite, Aztec Extension, Nancy Hawks, Rosita, Mountain Lion	36°37′47.1″N 105°11′2″W	Gold	May be the highest gold producer in the Baldy Mining District. An estimated $4 million in gold was mined.
Baldy Tunnel				
Black Horse	Black Horse Group	36°36′58.1″N 105°11′38″W	Gold, Silver	This mine produced ore worth an estimated $27000.
Bull of the Woods		36°37′18.3″N 105°11′59.9″W	Gold	Produced around $15000 in gold.
Chester Claim		36°38′06.1″N 105°13′52.2″W	Gold, Silver	As of 1946 there was a stamp mill.
Copper Park				
Denver				
French Henry		36°38′25.2″N 105°11′29″W	Gold, Silver	Workings contain 5 to 6 adits.
Golden Era Group	Twin Tungsten Prospect: Claims of the Golden Era Group, Twinn, Golden Era, Fairfax, City View, War Eagle	36°38′22.1″N 105°13′51″W	Gold, Tungsten, Silver	Reports of high grade ore, likely less than one ton. Workings contain three small adits.
Iron Mountain				
Legal Tender		36°36′30″N 105°13′39.9″W	Gold	Produced around $25000 in gold before 1946.
Montezuma				
Moreno Centennial				
Mystic	Claim	36°37′48.1″N 105°12′48″W	Copper, Gold	By 1946, 1000 tons of ore were produced. This ore was 20-25% copper.
Rebel Chief	Chief Tunnel, Virginia Hudson Tunnel, Mountain Queen Tunnel	36°37′03.1″N 105°11′16″W	Gold, Silver	Workings contain 12 tunnels.
Red Bandana				
