= Rayado =

Rayado may refer to:

- Rayado, New Mexico, a settlement in Colfax County, New Mexico, USA
- Rayado Program, a leadership program at Philmont Scout Ranch, New Mexico, USA
- Rayado Mesa, a mesa (landform) in Colfax County, New Mexico, USA
- Rayado Peak, a mountain near Rayado, Colfax County, New Mexico, USA
- Rayado Creek, also Rio Rayado, a tributary of the Cimarron River
- Rayado River Camp, a camp at Philmont Scout Ranch, New Mexico, USA
- Rayado Indians, a Spanish term for the Wichita people
