= Kit Carson =

American frontiersman and guide (1809–1868)

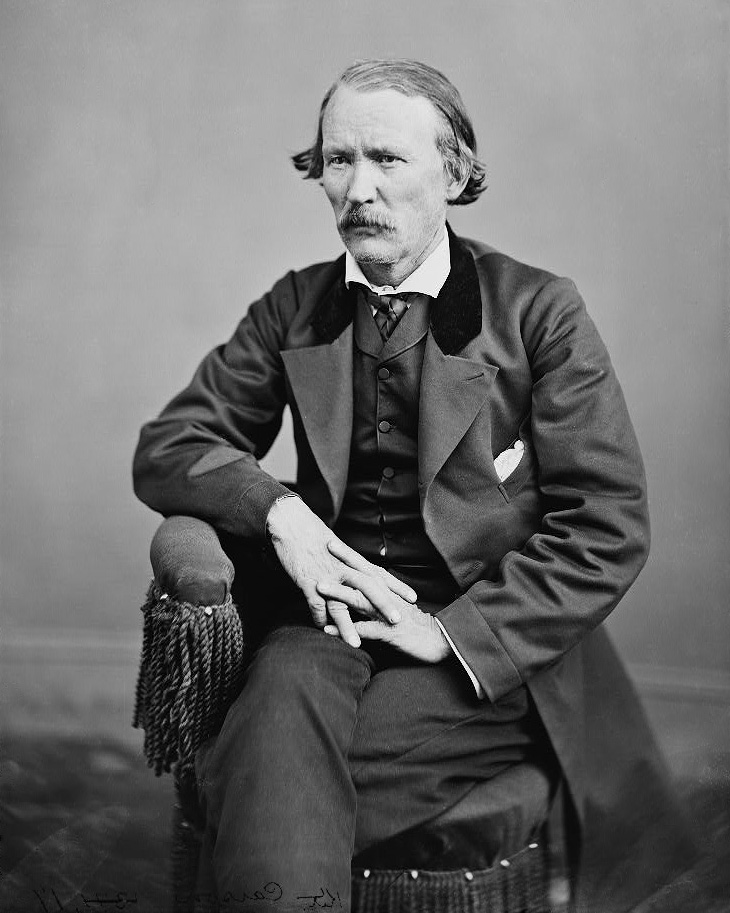
- Carson on a visit to Washington, D.C.
- Born: Christopher Houston Carson; December 24, 1809; Richmond, Kentucky, U.S.
- Died: May 23, 1868 (aged 58); Fort Lyon, Colorado Territory, U.S.
- Resting place: Kit Carson Cemetery, Taos, New Mexico
- Occupations: Mountain man, frontiersman, guide, Indian agent, United States Army officer
- Known for: Opening the American West to American pioneers; Carson City, Nevada namesake
- Spouses: Waanibe; Making-Out-Road; Josefa Jaramillo; (1843–1868; her death)
- Military career
- Allegiance: United States; Union
- Branch: United States Army; Union Army
- Service years: 1846 - 1864
- Rank: Brevet Brigadier General
- Commands: 1st New Mexico Volunteer Cavalry Regiment
- Conflicts: Mexican–American War; Battle of San Pasqual; American Indian Wars; Battle of Ojo Caliente Canyon; Battle of Canyon de Chelly; First Battle of Adobe Walls; American Civil War; Battle of Valverde

Christopher Houston Carson (December 24, 1809 – May 23, 1868), popularly known as Kit Carson, was an American frontiersman, fur trapper, wilderness guide, Indian agent and U.S. Army officer.

Carson left home in rural Missouri at 16 to become a mountain man and trapper in the West. In the 1830s, he accompanied Ewing Young on an expedition to Mexican California and joined fur-trapping expeditions into the Rocky Mountains. He lived among and married into the Arapaho and Cheyenne tribes. In the 1840s, Carson was hired as a guide by John C. Frémont, whose expeditions covered much of California, Oregon, and the Great Basin area. Frémont mapped and wrote reports and commentaries on the Oregon Trail to assist and encourage westward-bound pioneers, and Carson achieved national fame through those accounts. Under Frémont's command, Carson participated in the U.S. conquest of California from Mexico, and the Sacramento River massacre and Klamath Lake massacre against Native Americans. Later in the war, Carson was a scout and courier, celebrated for his rescue mission after the Battle of San Pasqual and for his coast-to-coast journey to Washington, D.C., to deliver news of the conflict in California. In the 1850s, he was appointed as the Indian agent to the Ute Indians and the Jicarilla Apaches.

During the American Civil War, Carson led a regiment of mostly Hispanic volunteers from New Mexico on the side of the Union at the Battle of Valverde in 1862. When the Confederate threat was eliminated in New Mexico, Carson led forces to suppress the Navajo, Mescalero Apache, Kiowa, and Comanche tribes by destroying their food sources. Carson oversaw the Long Walk of the Navajo. He was breveted a brigadier general and took command of Fort Garland, Colorado, but poor health soon forced him to retire from military life. Carson was married three times and had ten children. He died at Fort Lyon of an aortic aneurysm on May 23, 1868. He is buried in Taos, New Mexico, next to his third wife, Josefa Carson.

Carson became an American frontier legend in his own lifetime through biographies and news articles; exaggerated versions of his exploits were the subject of dime novels. His understated nature belied confirmed reports of his fearlessness, combat skills, tenacity, as well as profound effect on the westward expansion of the United States. Although he was famous for much of his life, historians in later years have written that Kit Carson did not like, want, or even fully understand the fame that he experienced during his life. During the late nineteenth century, Kit Carson became a legendary symbol of America's frontier experience, which influenced twentieth century erection of statues and monuments, public events and celebrations, imagery by Hollywood, and the naming of geographical places. In the 21st century, Carson's legacy has been contested, particularly due to his brutal treatment of Native Americans.

== Early life (1809–1829) ==
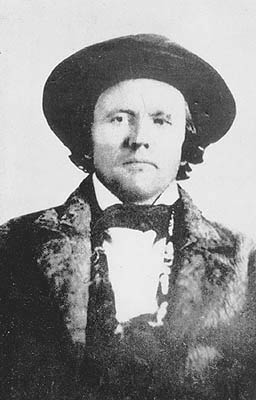
Early photograph (possibly the first) of Kit Carson wearing a beaver hat

Christopher Houston Carson was born on December 24, 1809, near Richmond, Madison County, Kentucky. His parents were Lindsay Carson and his second wife, Rebecca Robinson. Lindsay had five children by his first wife, Lucy Bradley, and ten more children by Rebecca. Lindsay Carson had a Scots-Irish Presbyterian background. He was a farmer, a cabin builder, and a veteran of the American Indian Wars, and American Civil War. He fought Natives on the American frontier and lost two fingers on his left hand in a battle with the Fox and Sauk Indians.

The Carson family moved to Boone's Lick, Howard County, Missouri, when Kit was about a year old. The family settled on a tract of land owned by the sons of Daniel Boone, who had purchased the land from the Spanish. The Boone and Carson families became good friends and worked and socialized together and intermarried. Lindsay's oldest son, William, married Boone's grand-niece, Millie Boone, in 1810. Their daughter Adaline became Kit's favorite playmate.

Missouri was then the frontier of American westward expansionism; cabins were "forted" with tall stockade fences to defend against Native attacks. As men worked in the fields, sentries were posted with weapons to protect the farmers. Carson wrote in his Memoirs, "For two or three years after our arrival, we had to remain forted and it was necessary to have men stationed at the extremities of the fields for the protection of those that were laboring."

In 1818, Lindsay Carson died instantly when a tree limb fell on him while he was clearing a field. Kit was about eight years old. Despite being penniless, his mother took care of her children alone for four years. She then married Joseph Martin, a widower with several children. Kit was a young teenager and did not get along with his stepfather. The decision was made to apprentice him to David Workman, a saddler in Franklin, Missouri. Kit wrote in his Memoirs that Workman was "a good man, and I often recall the kind treatment I received".

Franklin was situated at the eastern end of the Santa Fe Trail, which had opened two years earlier. Many of the customers at the saddle shop were trappers and traders from whom Carson heard stirring tales of the West. Carson found work in the saddlery not to his taste: he once stated that "the business did not suit me, and I concluded to leave."

=== Santa Fe Trail ===
In August 1826, against his mother's wishes, Kit ran away from his apprenticeship. He went west with a caravan of fur trappers and tended their livestock. They made their trek over the Santa Fe Trail to Santa Fe, the capital of Santa Fe de Nuevo México, reaching their destination in November 1826. He settled in Taos.

Carson lived with Mathew Kinkead, a trapper and explorer who had served with Carson's older brothers during the War of 1812. Carson was mentored by Kinkead in learning the skills of a trapper and learning the necessary languages for trade. Eventually, he became fluent in Spanish and several Native American languages.

Workman put an advertisement in a local newspaper back in Missouri. He wrote that he would give a one-cent reward to anyone who brought the boy back to Franklin. No one claimed the reward. It was a bit of a joke, but Carson was free. The advertisement featured the first printed description of Carson: "Christopher Carson, a boy about 16 years old, small of his age, but thick set; light hair, ran away from the subscriber, living in Franklin, Howard county, Missouri, to whom he had been bound to learn the saddler's trade."

Between 1827 and 1829, Carson worked as cook, translator, and wagon driver in the southwest. He also worked at a copper mine near the Gila River, in southwestern New Mexico. In later life, Carson never mentioned any women from his youth. Only three specific women were mentioned in his writing: Josefa Jaramillo, his third and last wife; a comrade's mother in Washington, DC; and Mrs. Ann White, killed by Natives after the White massacre.

== Mountain man (1829–1841) ==
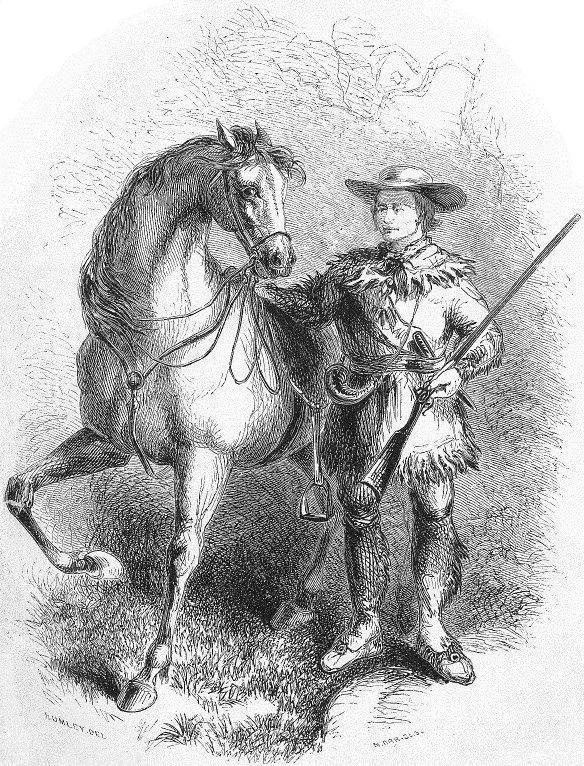
Mountain man Kit Carson and his favorite horse, Apache, from The Life and Adventures of Kit Carson, the Nestor of the Rocky Mountains by De Witt C. Peters. The book was Carson's first biography and was printed in 1858.

At the age of 19, Carson began his career as a mountain man. He traveled through many parts of the American West with famous mountain men like Jim Bridger and Old Bill Williams. He spent the winter of 1828–1829 as a cook for Ewing Young in Taos. He joined Young's trapping expedition of 1829. The leadership of Young and the experience of the venture are credited with shaping Carson's early life in the mountains. In addition to furs and the company of other mountain men, Carson sought action and adventure. Carson probably killed and scalped a Native for the first time when he was 19, during Young's expedition.

In August 1829, the party went into Apache territory along the Gila River. The expedition was attacked, giving Carson his first experience of combat. Young's party continued on to Alta California; trapped and traded in California from Sacramento in the north to Los Angeles in the south; and returned to Taos, New Mexico, in April 1830 after it had trapped along the Colorado River.

Carson joined a rescue party in Taos searching for the perpetrators of an attack on a wagon train, although the perpetrators managed to escape. Carson joined another expedition, led by Thomas Fitzpatrick and William Levin, in 1831. Fitzpatrick, Levin, and his trappers went north to the central Rocky Mountains. Carson hunted and trapped in the West for about ten years. He was known as a reliable man and a good fighter.

Life for Carson as a mountain man was not easy. After collecting beavers from traps, he had to hold onto them for months at a time until the annual Rocky Mountain Rendezvous, held in remote areas of the West like the banks of the Green River in Wyoming. With the money received for the pelts, the necessities of an independent life, including fish hooks, flour and tobacco, were bought. As there was little or no medical access in the regions in which he worked, Carson had to dress his wounds and nurse himself. There was also sometimes conflict with Indians. Carson's primary clothing then was made of deer skins that had stiffened from being left outdoors for a long period of time. This clothing offered some protection against weapons used by hostile Indians.

Grizzly bears were one of the mountain man's greatest enemies. In 1834, when Carson was hunting an elk alone, two bears crossed paths with him and quickly chased him up a tree. One of the bears tried, unsuccessfully, to make him fall by shaking the tree, but eventually went away. Carson then returned to his camp as fast as possible. He wrote in his Memoirs, "[The bear] finally concluded to leave, of which I was heartily pleased, never having been so scared in my life."

Carson's Memoirs are full of stories about hostile Indian encounters. In January 1833, for example, warriors of the Crow tribe stole nine horses from Carson's camp. Carson and two other men sprayed the Crow camp with gunfire, killing most of the Crow. Carson wrote in his Memoirs, "During our pursuit for the lost animals, we suffered considerably but, the success of having recovered our horses and sending many a redskin to his long home, our sufferings were soon forgotten."

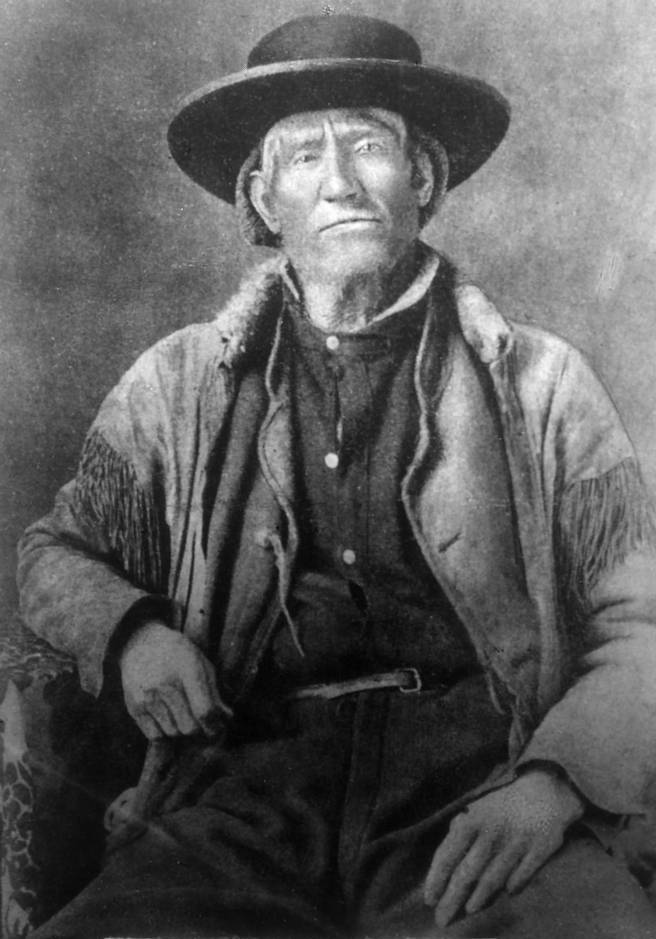
Jim Bridger

Carson viewed the Blackfoot Nation as a hostile tribe and the greatest threat to his livelihood and safety. For this reason he came into conflict with them on several occasions. The historian David Roberts wrote: "It was taken for granted that the Blackfeet were bad Indians; to shoot them whenever he could was a mountain man's instinct and duty." Carson had several encounters with the Blackfoot. His last battle with the Blackfoot took place in spring 1838. He was traveling with about one hundred mountain men led by Jim Bridger. In Montana Territory, the group found a teepee with the corpses of three Indians who had died of smallpox inside. Bridger wanted to move on, but Carson and the other young men wanted to kill Blackfoot, so they found the Blackfoot village and killed ten Blackfoot warriors. The Blackfoot found some safety in a pile of rocks but were driven away. It is not known how many Blackfoot died in this incident. The historian David Roberts wrote that "if anything like pity filled Carson's breast as, in his twenty-ninth year, he beheld the ravaged camp of the Blackfoot, he did not bother to remember it." Carson wrote in his Memoirs that the battle was "the prettiest fight I ever saw".

His last rendezvous with trappers was held in 1840. At that time, the fur trade began to drop off as beaver hats went out of fashion and beaver populations across North America were declining rapidly from overexploitation. Carson knew that it was time to find other work. He wrote in his Memoirs, "Beaver was getting scarce, it became necessary to try our hand at something else." In 1841, he was hired at Bent's Fort, in Colorado, at the largest building on the Santa Fe Trail. Hundreds of people worked or lived there. Carson hunted buffalo, antelope, deer, and other animals to feed the people, paid one dollar a day. He returned to Bent's Fort several times during his life to provide meat for the fort's residents.

== Expeditions with Frémont (1842–1848) ==
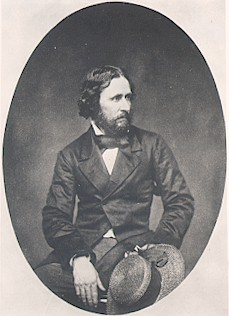
John Charles Frémont, photographer and date unknown

In April 1842, Carson went back to his childhood home in Missouri to put his daughter Adaline in the care of relatives. On the return trip, Carson met John C. Frémont aboard a steamboat on the Missouri River. Frémont was a US Army officer in the Corps of Topographical Engineers who was about to lead an expedition into the West. After a brief conversation, Frémont hired Carson as a guide at $100 a month, the best-paying job of Carson's life. Frémont wrote, "I was pleased with him and his manner of address at this first meeting. He was a man of medium height, broad-shouldered, and deep-chested, with a clear steady blue eye and frank speech and address; quiet and unassuming."

=== First expedition, 1842 ===
In 1842, Carson guided Frémont across the Oregon Trail to South Pass, Wyoming. It was their first expedition into the West together. The purpose of this expedition was to map and describe the Oregon Trail as far as South Pass. A guidebook, maps, and other paraphernalia would be printed for westward-bound migrants and settlers. After the five-month trouble-free mission was accomplished, Frémont wrote his government reports, which made Carson's name known across the United States, and spurred a migration of settlers westward to Oregon via the Oregon Trail.

=== Second expedition, 1843 ===
In 1843, Carson agreed to join Frémont's second expedition. Carson guided Frémont across part of the Oregon Trail to the Columbia River in Oregon. The purpose of the expedition was to map and describe the Oregon Trail from South Pass, Wyoming, to the Columbia River. They also made a side-trip to Great Salt Lake in Utah, using a rubber raft to navigate the waters. On the way to California, the party suffered from bad weather in the Sierra Nevada Mountains but was saved by Carson's good judgment and his skills as a guide; they found Native American (Northern Paiutes) who fed them. The expedition then headed to California, which was illegal and dangerous because California was Mexican territory. The Mexican government ordered Frémont to leave. Frémont finally went back to Washington, D.C. The government liked his reports but ignored his illegal trip into Mexico. Frémont was made a captain. The newspapers nicknamed him "The Pathfinder".

During the expedition, Frémont trekked into the Mojave Desert. His party met a Mexican man and boy, who both told Carson that Native Americans had ambushed their party of travelers. The male travelers were killed; the women travelers were staked to the ground, sexually mutilated, and killed. The murderers then stole the Mexican's 30 horses. Carson and a mountain man friend, Alexis Godey, went after the murderers. After two days they found them, rushed into their camp, and killed and scalped two of the murderers. The stolen horses were recovered and returned to the Mexican man and boy. That deed brought Carson even greater fame and confirmed his status as a western hero in the eyes of the American people.

=== Third expedition, 1845 ===
In 1845, Carson guided Frémont on their third expedition (Frémont made a fourth, but without Carson). From Westport Landing, Missouri, they crossed the Rockies, passed the Great Salt Lake, and down the Humboldt River to the Sierra Nevada of California and Oregon. Frémont made scientific plans and included artist Edward Kern in his corps, but from the outset the expedition appeared to be political in nature. Frémont may have been working under secret government orders, since US President Polk wanted Alta California for the United States. Once in California, Frémont started to rouse the American settlers into a patriotic fervor. The Mexican general José Castro at Monterey ordered him to leave. On Gavilán Mountain, Frémont erected a makeshift fort and raised the US flag in defiance, before departing north. The party moved into the Sacramento River Valley past Mount Shasta, surveying into Oregon, fighting Indians along the way, and camped near Klamath Lake. Near here, a messenger from Washington, D.C., caught up with Frémont and made it clear that Polk wanted California.

On March 30, 1846, while traveling north along the Sacramento Valley, Frémont's party met Americans who said that a group of Native Americans was planning to attack settlers. Frémont's party set about searching for Native Americans. On April 5, 1846, Frémont's party spotted a Wintu village and launched an unprovoked attack, killing 120 to 300 men, women, and children, and displacing many more in what is known as the Sacramento River massacre. Carson, later stated that "It was a perfect butchery."

At Klamath Lake, in southern Oregon, Frémont's party was hit in a revenge attack by 15 to 20 Indians on the night of May 9, 1846. Two or three men in camp were killed. The attackers fled after a brief struggle. Carson, angry that his friends had been killed, took an ax to a dead Indian and, according to Frémont, "knocked his head to pieces". In retaliation for the attack, a few days later, Frémont's party massacred a village of Klamath people along the Williamson River in what was called the Klamath Lake massacre. The entire village was razed and at least 14 people were killed. There was no evidence that the village in question had anything to do with the previous attack.

=== Bear Flag Revolt ===
In June 1846, Frémont and Carson participated in a California uprising against Mexico, the Bear Flag Revolt. Mexico ordered all Americans to leave California. American settlers in California wanted to be free of the Mexican government and declared California an independent republic. The American rebels found the courage to oppose Mexico because they had Frémont, who had written an oath of allegiance, and his troops behind them. Frémont and his men were able to give some protection to the Americans. He ordered Carson to kill an old Mexican man, José de los Reyes Berreyesa, and his two adult nephews, who had been captured when they stepped ashore at San Francisco Bay to prevent them from notifying Mexico about the uprising.

Frémont worked hard to win California for the United States, for a time fashioning himself as its military governor until he was replaced by General Stephen W. Kearny, who outranked him.

From 1846 to 1848, Carson served as courier traveling three times from California to the East and back. Frémont wrote, "This was a service of great trust and honor... and great danger also." In 1846, dispatched with military records for the Secretary of War in Washington, D.C., Carson took the Gila Trail, but was met on the trail by General Kearny, who ordered him to hand his dispatches to others bound east, and return to California as his much-needed guide. In early 1847, Carson was ordered east from California again with more dispatches for Washington, D.C., where he arrived by June. Returning to California via a short visit with his family in Taos, he followed the Old Spanish Trail to Los Angeles. He was dispatched a third time as government courier leaving Los Angeles in May 1848 via the Old Spanish Trail and reached Washington, D.C., with important military messages, which included an official report of the discovery of gold in California.

Newspapers reported on Carson's travels with some exaggeration, including that he had been killed by Plains Indians in July 1848. Lt. George Brewerton accompanied Carson on part of this trip and published in Harper's Magazine (1853) an account that added to his now-growing celebrity status. In 1848, as his fame grew, a Baltimore hat maker offered a "Kit Carson Cap", "after the unique style of the domestic one worn by that daring pioneer". A new steamboat, named the Kit Carson, was built for the Mississippi-Ohio river trade, "with qualities of great speed". At the St. Louis Jockey Club, one could bet on a horse "as swift as the wind", named "Kit Carson".

== Mexican–American War (1846–1848) ==
The Mexican–American War was an armed conflict between the United States and Mexico, lasting from 1846 to 1848. After the war, Mexico was forced to sell the territories of Alta California and New Mexico to the United States under the Treaty of Guadalupe Hidalgo.

One of Carson's best-known adventures took place during this war. In December 1846, Carson was ordered by General Kearny to guide him and his troops from Socorro, New Mexico, to San Diego, California. Mexican soldiers attacked Kearny and his men near the village of San Pasqual, California.

Kearny was outnumbered. He knew that he could not win and so ordered his men to take cover on a small hill. On the night of December 8, Carson, a naval lieutenant, Edward Fitzgerald Beale, and an Indian scout left Kearny to bring reinforcements from San Diego, 25 miles (40 km) away. Carson and the lieutenant removed their shoes because they made too much noise and walked barefoot through the desert. Carson wrote in his Memoirs, "Finally got through, but had the misfortune to lose our shoes. Had to travel over a country covered with prickly pear and rocks, barefoot."

By December 10, Kearny believed that reinforcements would not arrive. Kearny planned to break through the Mexican lines the next morning to escape, but 200 mounted American soldiers arrived in San Pasqual late that night. The American soldiers in force with Kearney swept the area, driving the Mexicans away. Kearny was in San Diego on December 12.

== Ranching, family life, and herding sheep (1848–1853) ==
After the Mexican–American War transferred California and New Mexico to the United States, Carson returned to Taos to attempt to transition into a career as a businessman and rancher. He developed a small rancho at Rayado, east of Taos, and raised beef. He brought his daughter Adaline from Missouri to join Josefa and the family in a period where family life settled the frontiersman. Josefa loved to sew, and he bought her an early sewing machine, one of the first Singer models, a resourceful tool for their expanding family. She managed the household, in the tradition of the Hispanic women of New Mexico, while he continued shorter travels. In the summer of 1850, he sold a herd of horses to the military at Fort Laramie, Wyoming. The following year, he took wagons on a trading expedition to Missouri and back along the Santa Fe Trail. In 1852, for old times' sake, he and a few of the veteran trappers made a loop trapping expedition through Colorado and Wyoming.

In mid-1853, Carson left New Mexico with 7,000 thin legged churro sheep for the California Trail across Wyoming, Utah, Nevada and into California. He was taking them to settlers in northern California and southern Oregon. Carson had with him six experienced New Mexicans from the haciendas of the Rio Abajo to herd the sheep. Upon his arrival in Sacramento, he was surprised to learn of his elevation, again, to a hero of the Conquest of California; over the rest of his life he was recognized as a celebrated frontiersman, an image developed by publications of varied accuracy.

== Books and dime novels (1847–1859) ==
Carson's fame spread throughout the United States with government reports, dime novels, newspaper accounts, and word of mouth. The first accounts published for popular audiences were extracts from Frémont's explorations reports as reprinted in period newspapers. Frémont's journals, modified by Jesse Benton Frémont into romantic accounts of the uncharted West, appeared in the early 1840s. Newspapers throughout the US and England reprinted excerpts about wild tales of buffalo hunts, vast new landscapes, and indigenous peoples. Carson's heroics enlivened the pages. In June 1847, Jesse Benton Frémont helped Carson prepare a brief autobiography, the first, published as an interview in the Washington, D.C. Union, and reprinted by newspapers across the country.

Charles E. Averill (1830–1852), "the youthful novelist", published a magazine article for Holden's Dollar Magazine in April 1848 that he expanded into a novel advertised as Kit Carson, the Prince of the Gold Hunters; or the Adventures of the Sacramento; a Tale of the New Eldorado, Founded on Actual Facts, an even more fantastic tale exploiting Carson's rising fame. It arrived on bookstore shelves by May 1849, in time for the California Gold Rush demand for narratives (fictional or not) on the trail to California. Averill's pioneers were in awe of Carson: "Kit Carson!...the famous hunter and adventurer of the Great West, the hardy explorer of the trackless wilderness...the prince of backwoodsmen" arrives to guide them. When later asked about the book, Carson said "every statement made [by Averill] is false."

Similarly, Emerson Bennett (1822–1905), a prolific novelist of sensational romances, wrote an overland trail account where a fictional Carson joins a California bound wagon train. Arriving in bookstores in January 1849, his The Prairie Flower, or Adventures in the Far West exploited the Carson myth, and, like Averill, quickly followed with a sequel. In each novel, the Westering immigrants are in awe of the famous Carson. Both novelists sensationalized the fictional Carson as an "Indian fighter", with gruesome trashy accounts as "red-skins" "bite the dust" (Averill, Gold Hunter). For example, of one victim, Averill wrote, "blood gushed in a copious stream from his nostrils"; while Bennett wrote "Kit Carson, like an embodied spirit of battle, thundered past me on his powerful charger, and bending forward in his saddle, with a motion quick as lightning itself, seized the scalp lock of my antagonist in one hand, and with the other completely severed his head from his body, which he bore triumphantly away" (Bennett, Prairie Flower, p. 64). The novelists' gruesome, gory and sensationalized woolly West descriptions would keep readers turning the pages, and buying more buckets-of-blood fictional accounts of Carson, especially during the coming age of dime novels.

=== Indian captive Ann White ===
Carson's reaction to his depiction in these first novels is suggested by the account of events around the fate of Ann White. In 1849, as he moved to civilian life at Taos and Rayado, Carson was asked to guide soldiers on the trail of White, her baby daughter, and "negro servant", who had been captured by Jicarilla Apaches and Utes. The commanding officer, Captain William Grier of the 1st Cavalry Regiment, ignored Carson's advice about an immediate rescue attempt after catching the Jicarillas unaware, but after a shot was fired the order was given to attack, and the Jicarillas had started to flee. As Carson describes it in his autobiography, "In about 200 yards, pursuing the Indians, the body of Mrs. White was found, perfectly warm, had not been killed more than five minutes - shot through the heart by an arrow.... I am certain that if the Indians had been charged immediately on our arrival she would have been saved." Her child and servant were taken away by the fleeing Jicarillas and killed shortly after the attack, according to an 1850 report by James S. Calhoun, the Superintendent of Indian Affairs in New Mexico.

A soldier in the rescue party wrote: "Mrs. White was a frail, delicate, and very beautiful woman, but having undergone such usage as she suffered nothing but a wreck remained; it was literally covered with blows and scratches. Her countenance even after death indicated a hopeless creature. Over her corpse, we swore vengeance upon her persecutors."

Carson discovered a fictional book, possibly by Averill, about himself in the Apache camp. He wrote in his Memoirs: "In camp was found a book, the first of the kind I had ever seen, in which I was made a great hero, slaying Indians by the hundreds, and I have often thought that Mrs. White would read the same, and knowing that I lived near, she would pray for my appearance and that she would be saved."

=== Memoirs ===
In 1854, Lt. Brewerton encouraged Carson to send him a sketch of his life, and offered to polish it into a book. Carson dictated a "memoir" of some 33,000 words over the next few years, but moved on to another collaborator. Friend Jesse B. Turley was engaged in late 1856 to help Carson prepare the memoir, and after a year's work sent the rough manuscript to a New York publisher. In 1858, Dr. DeWitte Clinton Peters (1829–1876), a U. S. Army surgeon who had met Carson in Taos, acquired the manuscript and with Charles Hatch Smith (1829–1882), a Brooklyn lawyer turned music teacher, sometime preacher, and author rewrote it for publication. The biography was titled Kit Carson, the Nestor of the Rocky Mountains, from Facts Narrated by Himself. When the book was read to Carson, he said, "Peters laid it on a leetle too thick." Originally offered by subscription by Smith's publisher, W. R. C. Clark & Co., New York City, it quickly earned rave reviews, not for its prose but its subject matter. The first run, a pricey $2.50 gilt edition or $4 antiqued copy, included a note signed (maybe) by Carson authenticating the story and the authorization given to Dr. Peters for the work. The Peters (with the help of Smith) biography had expanded the slim memoirs by five times (to 534 pages), with much edited-in filler, moralizing, and tedium. A cheaper edition was published in 1859, followed by two imitations that stole the market. In 1860, Charles Burdett, "a writer of no particular distinction", wrote a biography based on the Dr. Peters work, published as The Life of Kit Carson, the Great Western Hunter. The great house of inexpensive novels and questionable nonfiction, Beadle's Dime Library, in 1861, brought out The Life and Times of Kit Carson, the Rocky Mountain Scout and Guide by Edward S. Ellis, one of the stable of writers used by the firm. A popular, shorter work, it also used the Dr. Peters biography, which itself Peters revised in 1874 to bring the biography up to Carson's 1868 death. It is unknown if Carson profited from any of these publications based on his memoirs.

In 1905, among the estate of Dr. Peter's son in Paris, was located the original Carson memoir. This was published with little comment in 1926, followed by a revised or "polished" version in 1935, and, finally, in 1968, a solidly annotated edition edited by Harvey Lewis Carter, who had cleared up much of the background about the manuscript. Carson's memoir is the most important source about his life, to 1858, but as Carter notes, Carson was too brief, had lapses in memory, and his chronology was fallible. One frustrated author wrote of the Carson memoir that it "is as skinny as a hairless Chihuahua dog and as bald of details as a white egg".

=== Dime novels ===
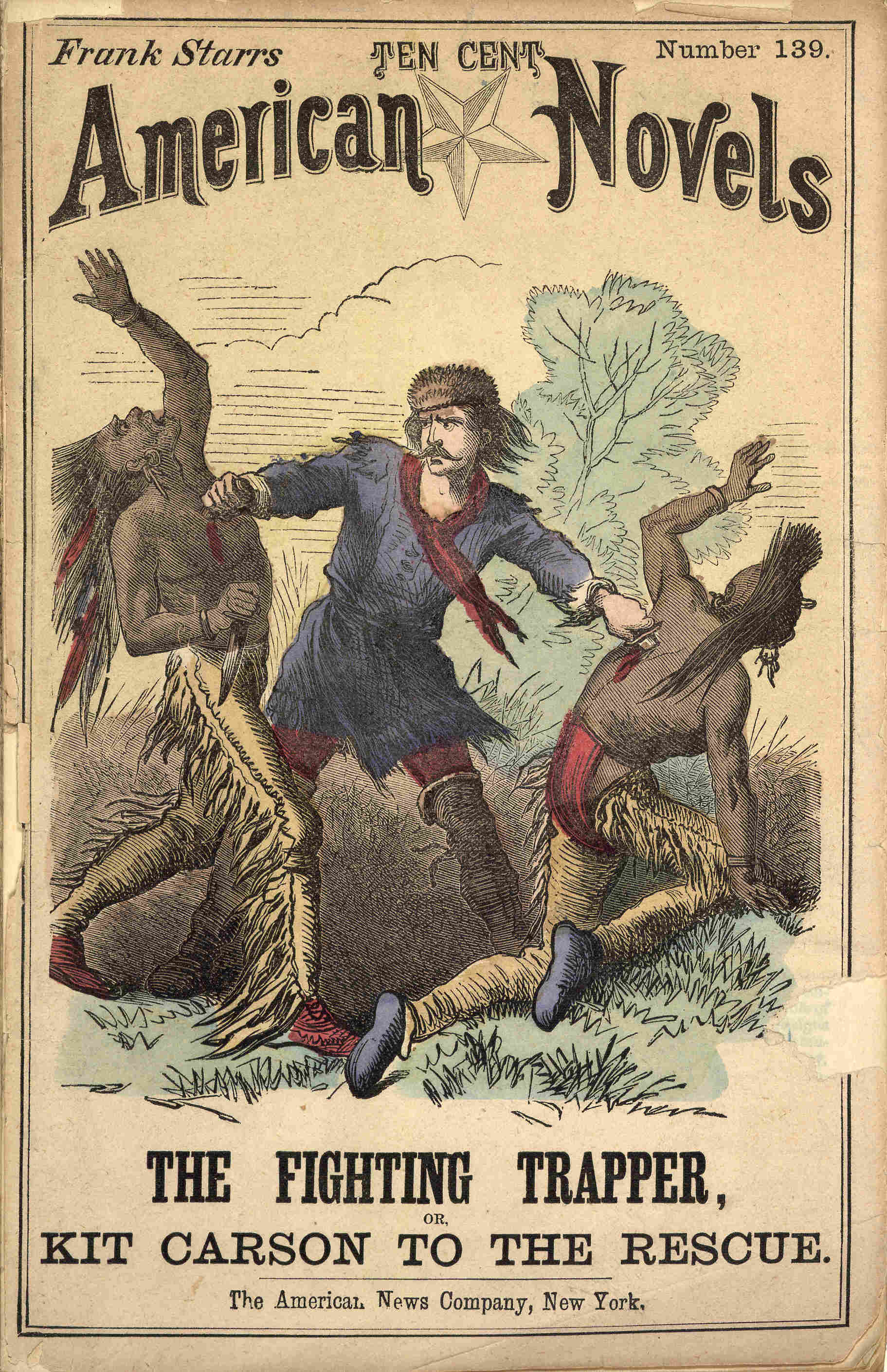
An 1874 dime novel with a depiction of Carson on the cover, stabbing two Indians simultaneously, one through the chest, and one in the back.

During the last half of the nineteenth century, inexpensive novels and pseudo-nonfiction met the need of readers looking for entertainment. Among the major publishing firms was the house of Beadle, opened in 1860. One study, "Kit Carson and Dime Novels, the Making of a Legend" by Darlis Miller, notes some 70 dime novels about Carson were either published, re-published with new titles, or incorporated into new works over the period 1860–1901. The usual blood-and-thunder tales exploited Carson's name to sell copies. When competition threatened the house of Beadle, a word-smith said they "just kill more Indians" per page to increase sales. Skewed images of the personalities and place are exemplified by the Beadle title: Kiowa Charley, The White Mustanger; or, Rocky Mountain Kit's Last Scalp Hunt (1879) in which an older Carson is said to have "ridden into Sioux camps unattended and alone, had ridden out again, but with the scalps of their greatest warriors at his belt". Edward Ellis, biographer of Carson, wrote under the pseudonym of J. F. C. Adams The Fighting Trapper or Kit Carson to the Rescue (1879), another lurid work without any hint of reality.

By the 1880s, the shoot-em-up gunslinger was replacing the frontiersman tales, but of those in the new generation, one critic notes, "where Kit Carson had been represented as slaying hundreds of Indians, the [new] dime novel hero slew his thousands, with one hand tied behind him." The dime novel's impact was the blurring of the real Carson by creating a mythic character. In fiction, according to historian of literature Richard Etulain, "the small, wiry Kit Carson becomes a ring-tailed roarer, a gigantic Samson... a strong-armed demigod [who] could be victorious and thus pave the way for western settlement."

== Indian Agent (1854–1861) ==
Between January 1854 and May 1861, Carson served as one of the first Federal Indian Agents in the Far West. He sold his interest in the Rayado ranch and opened an office in a room of his Taos home, gratis—the office would be perpetually underfunded. He was responsible for the Maoche Ute people, Jicarilla Apache, and Taos Pueblo in a vast expanse of northern New Mexico Territory (which then included southwest Colorado). His duties were broad and insurmountable: "prevent conflict as far as possible, to persuade the Indians to submit to the government's will, and to solve problems arising from contact between Indians and whites".

The seven years as agent is probably the best documented of his life because of the correspondence, weekly and annual reports, and special filings required by the position (he had a private secretary because he could not write; some believe the secretary took the dictation also for his memoir). He summarized meetings with tribes - almost a daily occurrence when home - such as disputes over who stole whose cow, and the day-to-day effort to help with food, clothes and presents for tribes. He negotiated a halt of Plains tribes killing Taos Pueblo Indians desiring the traditional hunt of buffalo near Raton. Carson had the advantage of knowing at least fourteen Indian dialects as well as being a master of sign language.

One complex issue was captives. For example, captives stolen from Navajo by Ute were sold in the New Mexico settlements, or of a white child from central Texas settlements taken captive by Plains tribes then sold in New Mexico. As agent, Carson intervened.

Much of Carson's work as agent has been overlooked because of the focus on his mountain-man explorer or blood-and-thunder image. This was a significant period for him as well as the region, which experienced a large folk migration of Hispanos into Indian lands, as well as the Colorado gold rush and its impact on the tribes. Carson's view of the best future for the nomadic Indian evolved. By the late 1850s, he recommended, to make way for the increasing number of white settlers, that they should give up hunting and become herders and farmers, be provided with missionaries to Christianize them, and move onto reserves in their homeland but distant from settlements with their bad influence of ardent spirits, disease, and unscrupulous Hispanos and Anglos. Carson predicted, "If permitted to remain as they are, before many years they will be utterly extinct."

== Military career (1861–1868) ==
In April 1861, when the American Civil War broke out, many officers from the South in the United States Army resigned their commissions and offered their services to the Confederate States of America or their home states. Some of those officers were then serving in New Mexico Territory and included James Longstreet and Richard S. Ewell, both of whom gained senior rank in the Army of Northern Virginia, and Henry Hopkins Sibley. Arriving in Richmond, Sibley persuaded President Jefferson Davis to appoint him a brigadier general and lead a brigade of mounted cavalry to conquer New Mexico Territory and possibly Colorado Territory, southern California and the northern parts of the Mexican states of Sonora and Chihuahua.

When Confederate forces captured southern New Mexico Territory, the Union military commander, Colonel Edward Canby, ordered the governor to call for volunteers to defend the territory. Carson resigned his position as agent to the Ute Indian Tribe and volunteered to defend the Territory. Mindful that Carson had experienced military discipline as an army scout under Fremont and, later, with General Stephen Kearny during the War with Mexico, the governor appointed Carson the Lieutenant Colonel of the First New Mexico Volunteer Infantry. During the summer of 1861, Carson worked to organize the regiment of approximately one thousand men, most of whom were from prominent Hispanic families, at Fort Union in northeast New Mexico Territory. On September 21, the regiment's colonel resigned, and Carson assumed command.

=== Action against the Confederates ===
Canby had reservations about the fighting qualities of the volunteers and believed that his regular infantry were at a disadvantage in the vastness of New Mexico to the mounted Confederate cavalry. He decided to avoid fighting the Texans in the open field and strengthened the stone and adobe walls of his southern bastion, Fort Craig (about one hundred miles north of Mesilla). In January 1862, concluding that the Texans would invade northward up the Rio Grande River Valley, Canby consolidated most of his regular infantry and New Mexico volunteer regiments at Fort Craig. Following orders, Carson marched his First New Mexico regiment south from Albuquerque to form part of the fort's garrison.

On February 19, 1862, Carson led his regiment east across the Rio Grande to occupy high ground across from Fort Craig to protect the post from a Confederate-turning move. The next day, Canby joined Carson's regiment with the bulk of the regulars. However, when Texan artillery fire panicked troops from the Second New Mexico Volunteers, Canby withdrew most of his force back to the fort. Carson and his regiment remained on the east bank of the Rio Grande to protect the left flank of the Union line.

Two days later, the Confederate force sought to cross the Rio Grande to the west bank at the Valverde ford, about six miles north of Fort Craig. Canby deployed regulars and Colorado volunteer units as his front line. He assigned Carson's regiment to a support position behind the regulars on the left and, later in the fight, the center of the Union line.

Later in the day, Carson crossed to the east side of the river toward the Confederates. He advanced his regiment four hundred yards along the right flank of the Union line until ordered to withdraw. After the day-long battle, the Union force retreated to Fort Craig where Carson reported one enlisted man killed, one wounded, and eleven missing.

Following the Battle at Valverde, the Confederates moved north up the Rio Grande. In late March, Colorado volunteers destroyed the Confederate supply trains at the Battle of Glorieta Pass, necessitating that the Texans abandon their invasion of New Mexico Territory. Canby took the regulars north from Fort Craig to harass the retreating Confederates and herd them back to Texas. Carson and his regiment remained in Fort Craig. Although the starving Confederates passed a few miles to the west of the fort, Canby, seeing no need to risk a pitched battle with a defeated and retreating foe, did not order Carson to confront the Confederate column. Carson and his regiment remained in Fort Craig through the spring and summer of 1862.

Canby held Carson's regiment in reserve at the Battle at Valverde and assigned it and other New Mexico volunteer regiments to passively garrison Fort Craig while he used regulars and Colorado volunteer troops to herd the Texans out of the territory. He believed that the Hispanic volunteers would not stand up to the Texans in combat. Canby reported that the "people of the Territory, with few exceptions, I believe, are loyal, but they are apathetic in disposition," which explained their "tardiness" in volunteering. He contended that he could "place no reliance upon any volunteer force that can be raised, unless strongly supported by regular troops." Carson concurred. He co-signed a letter stating "that without the support and protection of the Regular Army of the United States they [New Mexicans] are entirely unable to protect the public property in the Territory or the lives of such officers, civil and military, as may be left among them after the withdrawal of the regular forces..."

=== Rounding up the Mescalero Apaches ===
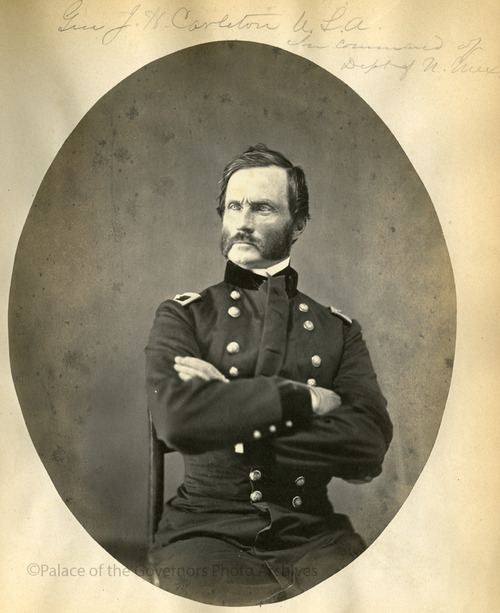
General James Henry Carleton

To confront the Texans, in 1861, Canby had consolidated his available force by pulling in the garrisons from posts built to control the Apache and Navajo Indians. When Canby ordered his troops to abandon Fort Stanton (about eighty miles east of Fort Craig) in August 1861, about two hundred of the approximately five hundred Mescalero Apache Indians were subsisting on rations distributed to them by the army. With those supplies no longer available, some of the nine bands of Mescalero Apache Indians began raiding ranches and communities near their homeland in the Capitan Mountains.

Brigadier General James Carleton, of the First California Volunteer Cavalry, succeeded Canby as military commander of the territory in the fall of 1862. He then sent Carson and five companies of his regiment to occupy and re-build Fort Stanton. Carleton's confidential orders of October 12, 1862 to Carson, in part, read:

"All Indian men of that tribe [Mescalero Apache] are to be killed whenever and wherever you find them: the women and children will not be harmed, but you will take them prisoners and feed them at Fort Stanton..."

Carleton felt that "this severity in the long run will be the most humane course that could be pursued toward these Indians." He intended to re-settle the Mescalero Apache Indians from their traditional lands in the Capitan Mountains to a reservation along the Pecos River at Bosque Redondo, near present-day Fort Sumner. In Carleton's vision, the government would teach the hunting-and-gathering Mescalero bands the arts of agriculture, thereby keeping them from marauding outside the reservation.

Before Carson arrived at Fort Stanton, Company H, commanded by Captain James Graydon, encountered a band of about thirty Mescalero Apache Indians under chiefs Manuelito and Jose Largo at Gallinas Springs on October 20, 1862. According to Major Arthur Morrison, Graydon "deceived" the Indians by offering them provisions and then shot and killed the two chiefs and nine others and wounded another twenty. Carson's inquiry into the matter came to naught when Graydon, months later, died of a wound received in a duel.

However, the shock of these killings, along with the fight between two companies of the First California Volunteer Cavalry from Fort Fillmore and a band of Apaches in Dog Canyon near Alamogordo, induced most of the surviving Mescalero chiefs to surrender to Carson. By March 1863, the army had settled the few hundred surviving Mescalero Apache Indians on Bosque Redondo near the newly built Fort Sumner. Perhaps a hundred of the Mescalero Apache Indians, such as the band led by Santana, either fled to Mexico or joined other Apache tribes to the west.

=== Campaign against the Navajo ===
Carleton had chosen a bleak site on the Pecos River for his reservation, which was called Bosque Redondo (Round Grove). He chose the site for the Apaches and Navajos because it was far from white settlements. He also wanted the Apaches and Navajo to act as a buffer for any aggressive acts committed upon the white settlements from Kiowas and Comanches to the east of Bosque Redondo. He thought also that the remoteness and desolation of the reservation would discourage white settlement.

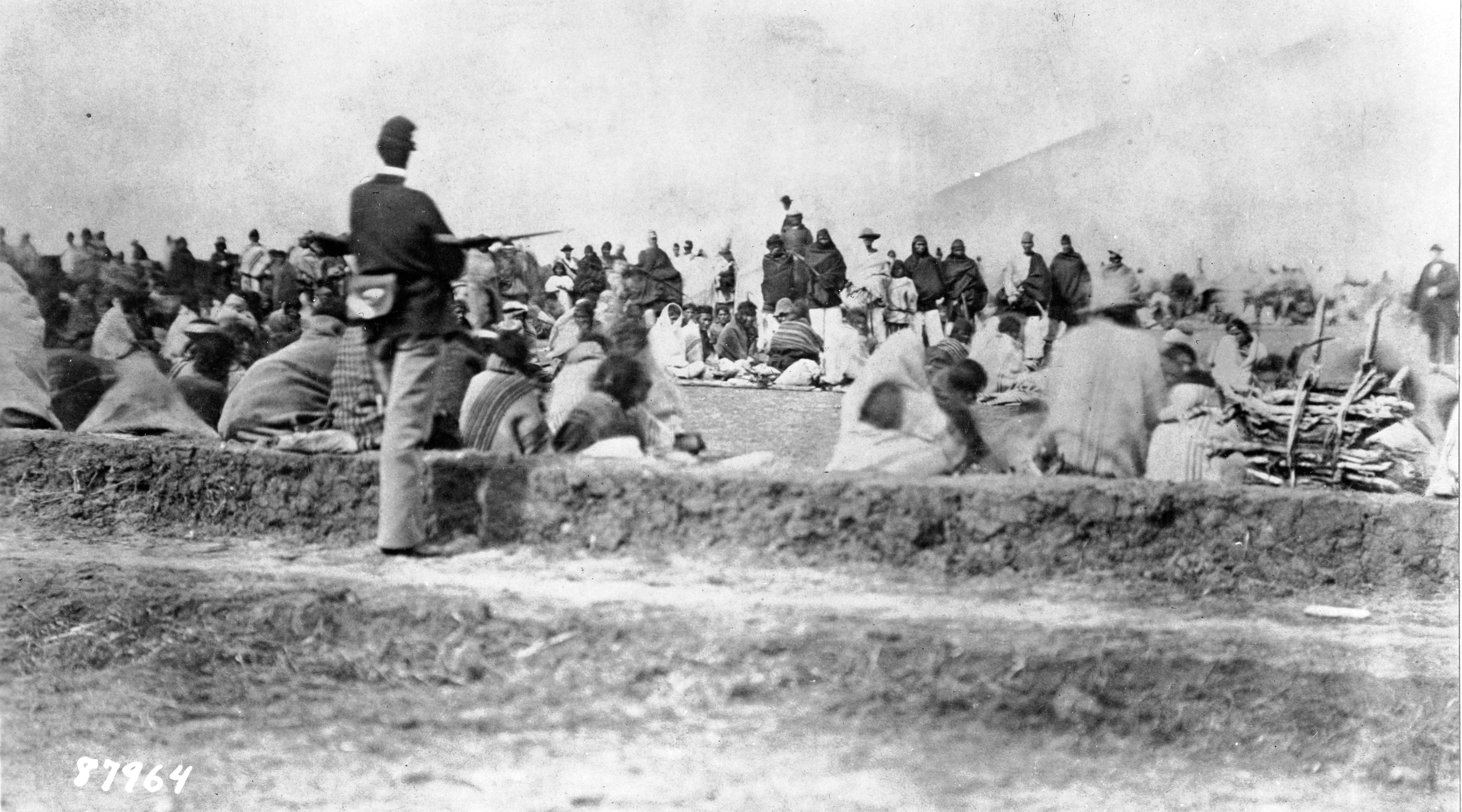
The Navajo at Fort Sumner, the end of The Long Walk

The Mescalero Apaches walked 130 miles (210 km) to the reservation. By March 1863, 400 Apaches had settled around nearby Fort Sumner. Others had fled west to join fugitive bands of Apaches. By mid-summer, many of the people were planting crops and doing other farm work.

On July 7, Carson, with little heart for the Navajo roundup, started the campaign against the tribe. His orders were almost the same as those for the Apache roundup: he was to shoot all males on sight and to take the women and children captives. No peace treaties were to be made until all Navajo were on the reservation.

Carson searched far and wide for the Navajo. He found their homes, fields, animals, and orchards, but the Navajo were experts at disappearing quickly and hiding in their vast lands. The roundup proved frustrating for Carson. He was in his fifties and tired and ill. By autumn 1863, Carson started to burn the Navajo homes and fields and remove their animals from the area. The Navajo would starve if the destruction continued, and 188 surrendered and were sent to Bosque Redondo. Life at the Bosque had turned grim, and murders took place. The Apaches and Navajos fought. The water in the Pecos contained minerals that gave people cramps and stomach aches. Residents had to walk 12 miles (19 km) to find firewood.

=== Battle of Canyon de Chelly ===
Carson wanted to take a winter break from the campaign. Major General Carleton refused and ordered him to invade the Canyon de Chelly, where many Navajos had taken refuge. The historian David Roberts writes, "Carson's sweep through the Canyon de Chelly in the winter of 1863–1864 would prove to be the decisive action in the Campaign."

The Canyon de Chelly was a sacred place for the Navajo. They believed that it would now be their strongest sanctuary, and 300 Navajo took refuge on the canyon rim, called Fortress Rock. They resisted Carson's invasion by building rope ladders and bridges, lowering water pots into a stream, and keeping quiet and out of sight. The 300 Navajo survived the invasion. In January 1864, Carson swept through the 35-mile (56 km) Canyon with his forces, including Captain Albert Pfeiffer. The thousands of peach trees in the canyon were cut down. Few Navajo were killed or captured. Carson's invasion, however, proved to the Navajo that the United States could invade their territory at any time. Many Navajo surrendered at Fort Defiance, Arizona.

By March 1864, there were 3,000 refugees at Fort Canby, with 5,000 more joining later. Suffering from the intense cold and hunger, Carson asked for supplies to feed and clothe the Navajo and forced the thousands of them to walk to Bosque Redondo. Many died along the way, and those falling behind were fatally shot. In Navajo history, the horrific trek is known as Long Walk of the Navajo. By 1866, reports indicated that Bosque Redondo was a complete failure, Major General Carleton was fired, and Congress started investigations. In 1868, a treaty was signed, and the Navajo were allowed to return to their homeland. Bosque Redondo was closed.

=== First Battle of Adobe Walls ===
On November 25, 1864, Carson led his forces against the southwestern tribes at the First Battle of Adobe Walls in the Texas Panhandle. Adobe Walls was an abandoned trading post that had been blown up by its inhabitants to prevent a takeover by hostile Indians. Combatants at the First Battle were the US Army and Indian scouts against Kiowas, Comanches, and Plains Apaches. It was one of the largest engagements fought on the Great Plains.

The battle was the result of General Carleton's belief that Indians were responsible for the continuing attacks on settlers along the Santa Fe Trail. He wanted to punish them and brought in Carson to do the job. With most of the army engaged elsewhere during the American Civil War, the protection that the settlers sought was almost nonexistent. Carson led 260 cavalry, 75 infantry, and 72 Ute and Jicarilla Apache Army scouts. In addition, he had two mountain howitzers which were fired at the cdr

On the morning of November 25, Carson discovered and attacked a Kiowa village of 176 lodges. After destroying the village, he moved forward to Adobe Walls. Carson found other Comanche villages in the area and realized he would face a very large force of Native Americans. A Captain Pettis estimated that 1,200 to 1,400 Comanche and Kiowa began to assemble. That number would swell, according to some accounts, to an implausible 3,000. Four to five hours of battle ensued. When Carson ran low on ammunition and howitzer shells, he ordered his men to retreat to a nearby Kiowa village, where they burned the village and many fine buffalo robes. His Indian scouts killed and mutilated four elderly and weak Kiowas.

First Adobe Walls, northeast of Stinnett in Hutchinson County, Texas, was Carson's last military engagement and ended inconclusively. Three of Carson's men died, and twenty-one were wounded. More than 100 warriors lost their lives, and 200 were wounded.

The retreat to New Mexico then began with few deaths among Carson's men. General Carleton wrote to Carson: "This brilliant affair adds another green leaf to the laurel wreath which you have so nobly won in the service of your country."

== Personal life ==
In 1847, the future General William Tecumseh Sherman met Carson in Monterey, California. Sherman wrote: "His fame was then at its height,... and I was very anxious to see a man who had achieved such feats of daring among the wild animals of the Rocky Mountains, and still wilder Indians of the plains.... I cannot express my surprise at beholding such a small, stoop-shouldered man, with reddish hair, freckled face, soft blue eyes, and nothing to indicate extraordinary courage or daring. He spoke but little and answered questions in monosyllables."

Colonel Edward W. Wynkoop wrote: "Kit Carson was five feet five and one half-inches tall [166 cm], weighed about 140 pounds [64 kg], of nervy, iron temperament, squarely built, slightly bow-legged, and those members apparently too short for his body. But, his head and face made up for all the imperfections of the rest of his person. His head was large and well-shaped with yellow straight hair, worn long, falling on his shoulders. His face was fair and smooth as a woman's with high cheekbones, straight nose, a mouth with a firm, somewhat sad expression yet kissable lips, a keen, deep-set but beautiful, mild blue eye, which could become terrible under some circumstances, and like the warning of the rattlesnake, gave notice of attack. Though quick-sighted, he was slow and soft of speech, and posed great natural modesty."

Lieutenant George Douglas Brewerton made one coast-to-coast dispatch-carrying trip to Washington, DC, with Carson. Brewerton wrote: "The Kit Carson of my imagination was over six feet [183 cm] high—a sort of modern Hercules in his build—with an enormous beard, and a voice like a roused lion.... The real Kit Carson I found to be a plain, simple... man; rather below the medium height, with brown, curling hair, little or no beard, and a voice as soft and gentle as a woman's. In fact, the hero of a hundred desperate encounters, whose life had been mostly spent amid wilderness, where the white man is almost unknown, was one of Dame Nature's gentleman [sic]...."

=== Marriages ===
Carson was married three times. His first two wives were Native American. His third wife was born of an old Hispanic family in Taos, New Mexico, then part of the Republic of Mexico. Carson was the father of ten children. He never wrote about his first two marriages in his Memoirs. He may have thought he would be known as a "squaw man", which was not welcomed by polite society.

In 1836, Carson met an Arapaho woman, Waanibe (Singing Grass, or Grass Singing), at a mountain man rendezvous held along the Green River in Wyoming. Singing Grass was a lovely young woman, and many mountain men were in love with her. Carson was forced to fight a duel with a French trapper, Chouinard, for Waanibe's hand in marriage. Carson won but had a very narrow escape. The French trapper's bullet singed his hair. The duel was one of the best known stories about Carson in the 19th century.

Carson married Singing Grass. She tended to his needs and went with him on his trapping trips. They had a daughter, Adaline (or Adeline). Singing Grass died after she had given birth to Carson's second daughter circa 1839. His second child did not live long. In 1843, in Taos, the young child fell into a boiling kettle of soap tallow and subsequently died.

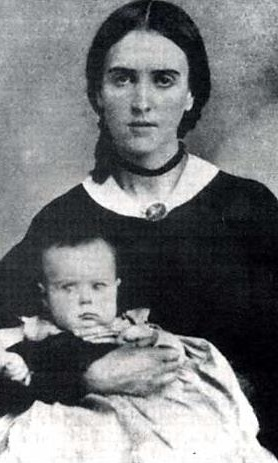
Josefa Carson, Carson's third and last wife, holds Carson's son

Carson's life as a mountain man was too hard for a little girl, so he took Adaline to live with his sister Mary Ann Carson Rubey in St. Louis, Missouri. Adaline was taught in a school for girls. Carson brought her West when she was a teenager. She married and divorced a George Stilts of St. Louis. In 1858, she went to the California goldfields. Adaline died in 1860 or after 1862, probably in Mono County, California.

In 1841, Carson married a Cheyenne woman, Making-Out-Road. They were together only a short time. Making-Out-Road divorced him in the way of her people by putting Adaline and all of Carson's property outside their tent. Making-Out-Road left Carson to travel with her people through the West.

About 1842, Carson met Josefa Jaramillo, the daughter of a prominent Mexican couple living in Taos. To marry her, Carson left the Presbyterian Church for the Catholic Church. He married the 14-year-old Josefa on February 6, 1843. They had eight children.

=== Freemasonry ===
Carson joined Freemasonry in the Santa Fe Territory of New Mexico, petitioning in Montezuma Lodge No. 101. He was initiated an Entered Apprentice on April 22, 1854, passed to the degree of Fellowcraft June 17, 1854, and raised to the sublime degree of Master Mason December 26, 1854, just two days after his 42nd birthday. Carson, together with several other Freemasons in Taos, petitioned to charter Bent Lodge No. 204 (now Bent Lodge # 42) from the Grand Lodge of Missouri AF&AM, a request that was granted on June 1, 1860, with Carson elected Junior Warden of the lodge. Carson served as Senior Warden the following year and would have served as Worshipful Master, but the lodge went dark due to the Civil War.

The Masonic fraternity continued to serve him and his family well after his death. In 1908, the Grand Lodge of New Mexico erected a wrought iron fence around his family burial plot. The following year, the Grand Lodge of New Mexico granted a new charter to Bent Lodge 42 and challenged the Lodge to purchase and preserve Carson's home. More than a century later, the Museum of Kit Carson's House is still managed by Bent Lodge.

=== Illiteracy ===
Despite being fluent in multiple European and Indian languages, Carson was illiterate. He was embarrassed by that and tried to hide it. In 1856, he dictated his Memoirs to another and stated: "I was a young boy in the school house when the cry came, Injuns! I jumped to my rifle and threw down my spelling book, and thar it lies."

Carson enjoyed having other people read to him and preferred the poetry of Lord Byron. Carson thought that Sir Walter Scott's long poem, The Lady of the Lake was "the finest expression of outdoor life". Carson eventually learned to write "C. Carson", but it was very difficult for him. He made his mark on official papers, and it was then witnessed by a clerk or other official.

== Final days ==
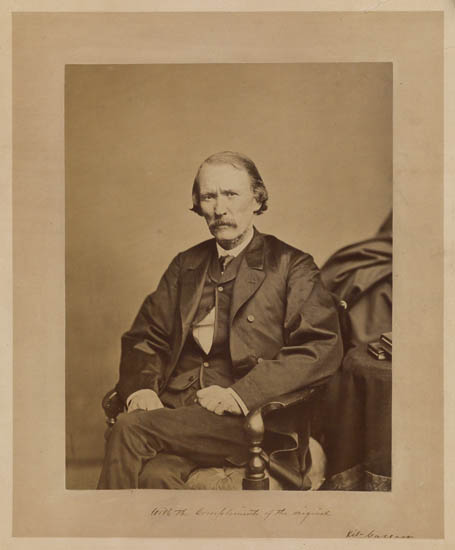
The last known photograph of Carson was taken around March 20, 1868, during Carson's visit to Boston with Ouray and Ute chiefs two months before his death, by the photographer James Wallace Black, and was signed by Carson. It is the largest extant photograph of him.

When the Civil War ended, and the Indian Wars campaigns were in a lull, Carson was appointed brevet brigadier general (dated March 13, 1865) and appointed commandant of Ft. Garland, Colorado, in the heart of Ute territory. Carson had many Ute friends in the area and assisted in government relations.

After being mustered out of the army, Carson took up ranching, settling at Boggsville in Bent County. In 1868, at the urging of Washington and the Commissioner of Indian Affairs, Carson journeyed to Washington, D.C., where he escorted several Ute Chiefs to meet with the US president to plead for assistance to their tribe. While in Washington, Carson was referred to a doctor by the name of Lewis Albert Sayre who lived in New York City. Carson made the short journey by train and met with Dr. Sayre who confirmed what Carson had already feared, he was suffering from an aneurysm. This wasn't new information for Carson, back in Colorado, Dr. Tilton had previously diagnosed him, and when he returned the doctor was shocked by the declining state of Carson. In fact, Carson was in such poor health that "...Dr. Tilton thought the trip had all but killed him" according to Hampton Sides in his book, Blood and Thunder. The trip to Washington, D.C., had taken a toll on Carson and caused the symptoms from his aneurysm to worsen.

Soon after his return, his wife, Josefa, died from complications after she gave birth to their eighth child. Her death was a crushing blow to Carson. According to Carson's son, Charles, "he just seemed to pine away after Mother died". The combination of a long and exhausting journey with the passing of his wife had a devastating effect on Carson. He died a month later, age 58, on May 23, 1868, in the presence of Dr. Tilton and his friend Thomas Boggs in the surgeon's quarters at Fort Lyon, Colorado. His last words were "Goodbye, friends. Adiós, compadres." The cause of his death was abdominal aortic aneurysm. His resting place is Taos, New Mexico.

== Legacy ==
=== Monument and memorials ===
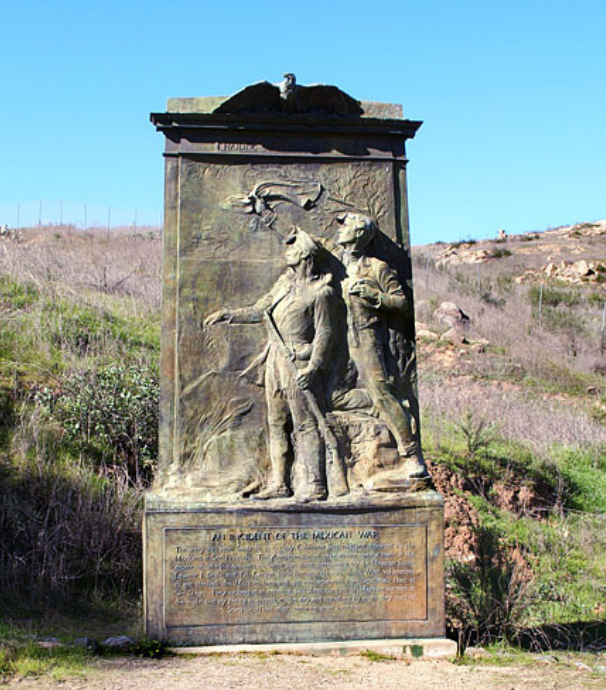
The San Pasqual Battlefield Monument, in San Diego, California, commemorates Carson and Beale's participation in the Battle of San Pasqual, during the U.S. Conquest of California.

The first Kit Carson monument, erected in Santa Fe in 1885 at the federal courthouse, was a simple stone obelisk with inscriptions including the words "pathfinder, pioneer, soldier", and "He Led the Way". Union Civil War veterans, the Grand Army of the Republic, led the fundraising and dedicated it "to remember the brave deeds of a pioneer and patriot who fought for his country".

In 1907, the Daughters of the American Revolution began placing monuments along the Santa Fe Trail and other sites that Carson had known. For example, the DAR guides noted the monument to Carson at Santa Fe and his and Josefa's home in Taos and the nearby cemetery, where his grave had been marked by the Grand Army of the Republic.

The first statues were erected in Colorado. In 1911, the granddaughter of Carson unveiled an equestrian statue at the community park near the state capitol in Denver. It "honored the great explorer" and was inscribed as well with "He Led the Way". In Trinidad, Colorado, the Daughters of the American Revolution and Boy Scouts of America led fund raising for the bronze statue of Carson in the city's new Kit Carson Park, placed in 1913.

Californians followed with a statue of Carson on Olvera Street in Los Angeles, and a bronze representation of a tree trunk with "Carson 1844" inscribed on it, placed at Carson Pass in the Sierra Nevada. Both represented him as the explorer. Other statues or monuments followed in California, Washington, D.C. (sculpted by Isidore Konti), Nevada, and elsewhere.

=== Historic preservation ===
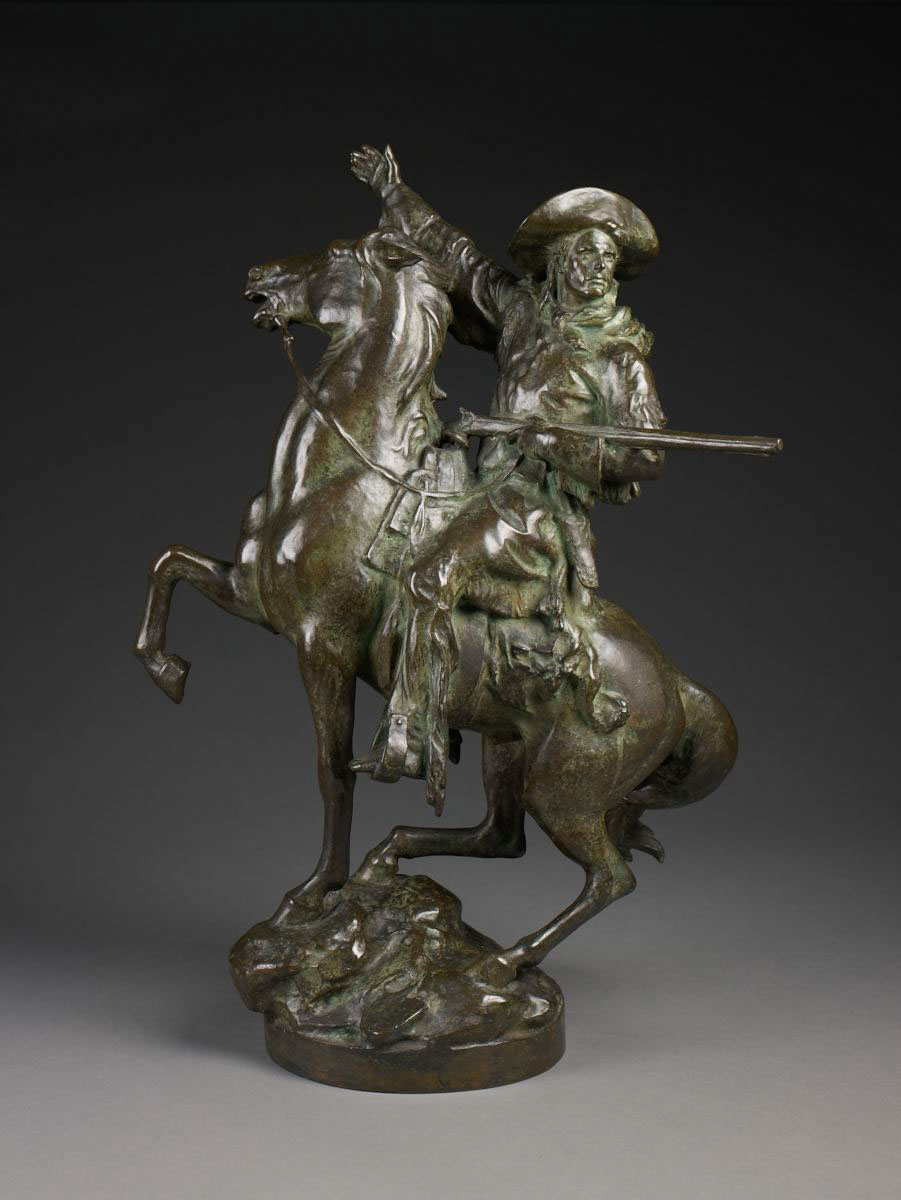
Kit Carson bronze statue by Frederick William MacMonnies, 1906

Though structures that Carson would have known had been preserved before 1950, full scale historic preservation projects of sites specifically significant for their association with Kit Carson did not begin until 1950s. In 1952, the Masonic Lodge of Taos, which had inherited the Carson home, restored and opened his classic adobe house as the Kit Carson Home and Museum, one representative of the early 19th century architecture and Hispano family setting but significant because of Carson. That same year, the state of New Mexico acquired the grave site and established Kit Carson State Park and Memorial Cemetery. The museum emphasized his early career, from around 1843 (when the Carsons bought the home) into the 1850s. Nearby, the former site of his Rayado home, acquired by the Boy Scouts of America, was reconstructed in spirit if not accuracy (no original architectural documents are extant) during the 1950s.

Carson's home in Taos, New Mexico, is the Kit Carson Home and Museum. His tourist attraction grave is nearby in the former Kit Carson State Park, now managed as a city park. A Kit Carson monument obelisk (1885) stands at the Santa Fe, New Mexico federal building park. The Kit Carson marker of bronze, dedicated to his 1844 trip, is in Carson Pass, California. A 1913 statue of Kit Carson stands at Trinidad, Colorado's Kit Carson Park. In Denver, Colorado, an equestrian statue of Kit Carson on horseback that once stood atop the Pioneer Fountain was removed and stored in 2020.

Carson National Forest in New Mexico was named for him, as were Kit Carson County and the town of Kit Carson, both in Colorado. A river and valley in Nevada are named for Carson as well as the state's capital, Carson City. The Carson Plain in southwest Arizona is named for him.

Kit Carson Peak in the Sangre de Cristo range in Colorado, Kit Carson Mesa in Colfax County, New Mexico, and Carson Pass in Alpine County, California, and the Carson River in Alpine County, California and Douglas, Storey, Lyon, and Churchill Counties in Nevada, are all named in honor for him.

Fort Carson, an army post near the city of Colorado Springs, Colorado, was named after him during World War II by the popular vote of the men training there. Kit Carson Park in Escondido, California, and in Taos, New Mexico are named in honor for him. Innumerable streets, businesses, and lesser geographical features were given his name.

== In popular culture ==
=== Early movies and television ===
Grand popular culture imagery of Carson, expressed through Hollywood cinema, began with the 1928 silent film Kit Carson from Paramount, a purported real-life story of Carson and the conquest of California. It was followed with a talking movie series begun in 1933, with 12 chapters, titled Fighting with Kit Carson with a cast including Johnny Mack Brown (as Kit) and both Noah Beery and Noah Beery Jr., with "plenty of stunts and action". Paramount's crew converted the series into a feature-length film, Fighting with Kit Carson, in 1946. These popular matinee westerns strove for entertainment, not for accuracy, and exploited the Kit Carson name and myth.

The Kit Carson character played minor roles in other 1930s Westerns like the 1936 Sutter's Gold, loosely about the California gold discovery; and the 1939 Mutiny on the Blackhawk, an odd western with a mutiny on a slave ship that lands in California with Kit Carson and others ready to save the day. The 1940 western titled Kit Carson stars Jon Hall (as Kit), Dana Andrews (as Fremont), and others. Kit joins Captain John Fremont to guide a wagon train just as Mexican General Castro orders all Americans from California, then the conquest of California begins, a tale enlivened with gratuitous Indian attacks. Filmed in Kayenta, Arizona, and nearby Monument Valley, Navajo were hired as part of the crew.

From 1951 to 1955, the television show The Adventures of Kit Carson ran for 105 episodes. He was a buckskin-clad heroic character who fights robbers, villains, and other bad guys. Bill Williams, who played Kit, complained that the show lacked the drama of the real Kit because of censors, NAFBRAT, wanting to eliminate violence from children's show. "Its all in the history books", Williams told the press, "the real Kit should be tough", fighting bears and mountain lions. He was a "famous Indian fighter". To him, TV Kit was "a sissy on horseback".

In 1977, Disney produced the television movie Kit Carson and the Mountain Men for the The Wonderful World of Disney. It starred Robert Reed, Ike Eisenmann, and Dub Taylor.

=== "Kit Carson Days" celebrations ===
The celebration of a community's past was a popular event by early in the twentieth century. A mountain man or "Kit Carson" themed history celebration was one of many that began to appear. They were not events to retell the accurate life of Kit Carson, but the mythic Kit. Alamosa, Colorado, Taos, New Mexico, Jackson, California, and elsewhere all had begun hosting "Kit Carson Days" celebrations by the 1930s. The event would have a mountain man camp, part of a living history spectacle, and include muzzle loading musket firing.

By the 1960s, Escondido, California's "Kit Carson Days" celebration included a reenactment of the "Battle of San Pasqual" and Indian dances at Kit Carson Park. Some advertised an emphasis on family fun, with children at the end of a parade—the "Kiddie Carson" parade—and young women competing to be "Kittie Carson". Because of COVID-19, none were scheduled for 2020.

=== Media portrayals ===
- Harry Carey played Carson in the 1936 film Sutter's Gold.
- Jon Hall played Carson in the 1940 Western film Kit Carson.
- Bill Williams played Carson in the TV mini-series 1951–1955 The Adventures of Kit Carson.
- Rip Torn played Carson in the 1986 miniseries Dream West.
- Carson was the inspiration for a same-named character in the popular Italian comic book series Tex Willer.
- Carson was a regular character in various UK publications, mostly from Amalgamated Press (IPC), including Cowboy Picture Library, Kit Carson Annual and weekly comics. Some of these were written by Michael Moorcock as a youth, as well as Carson being a supporting character in Moorcock's "Whitefriars" trilogy.
- Carson is a supporting character in Willa Cather's novel, Death Comes for the Archbishop.
- Carson is a vital supporting character in Flashman and the Redskins, an installment of the Flashman series by George MacDonald Fraser.
- Carson appeared in the INSP television series Into the Wild Frontier.
- Nathan Stevens as Kit Carson in episode 4 of The Men Who Built America: Frontiersmen
- Carson is the main character in Kevin Hauser's Dutch novel Als de ratelslang aanvalt (2024).

== Reputation ==
In 1950, professor Henry Nash Smith published his classic Virgin Land, the American West as Symbol and Myth. A new type of study, one that looked at literature to understand the general public's view of the frontier, and its creation myth and symbols. To Smith, Carson represented the symbolic mountain man image created first in the novels of James Fenimore Cooper's Leatherstocking Tales, the pathfinder who went into the wilderness as advance pioneer for civilization. Smith details the creation of mythic Carson as a national hero, as well as "Indian fighter, the daredevil horseman, the slayer of grizzly bears, the ancestor of the hundreds of two-gun men who came later decades to people the Beadle dime novels". Other writers defined two distinct Carsons portrayed in nineteenth century literature, of myth vs. reality. During the first half of the twentieth century, the general public put those beliefs in the mythic Carson into popular actions by erecting monuments and statues, holding public celebrations, and supporting early movies and television.

The 1970 publication of Dee Brown's best-selling Bury My Heart at Wounded Knee opened the eyes of the reading public to the tragic history of Native Americans which spurred a revaluation of the role of Carson in the Navajo wars. Over the last fifty years, echoing Brown, other writers, fiction and nonfiction, have split the mythic tale from Henry Nash Smith's Carson as symbol of America's heroic narrative of opening the West to create that of Carson as symbol for how the nation mistreated its indigenous peoples.

In 1973, during the annual Taos Fiesta, protesters declared that Carson should be stripped of historical honors, his grave at Taos threatened with exhumation, and the renaming of Kit Carson State Park was demanded. Taos led in reconsideration, in a public forum, as to whether Carson was the hero of old or a "blood thirsty imperialist". To one group represented, the American Indian Movement, Carson was responsible for the murder, or genocide of Native Americans. A subsequent history symposium, in 1993 in Taos, tried to enlighten and explain the frontiersman, to air various views. The Navajo were invited, but refused to attend. Voicing one extreme view, an anthropologist remarked, "It's like trying to rehabilitate Adolf Hitler."

New Mexico historian Marc Simmons published a piece that was presented at the 1993 conference. He started with the history of vandalizing of Carson related sites, the painting of a black swastika on his grave and the scratching of the word "killer" on a nearby marker, of the defacing of the Kit Carson monument in Santa Fe. He related how a young professor at Colorado College was successful in demanding that a period photograph of Carson be removed from the ROTC office; how a tourist told a journalist at the Carson home in Taos, "I will not go into the home of that racist, genocidal killer."; and a Navajo at a trading post said, "No one here will talk about Kit Carson. He was a butcher." Other examples were presented, then Simmons followed with a brief explanation of Carson and his times, a theme expanded by Tom Dunlay in, what Simmons calls a magisterial, balanced treatment of the world of Kit Carson & the Indians (2000).

In the early twenty-first century, best-selling writers Hampton Sides and David Roberts have reappraised the Carson reputation in their works, and have explained the complex image of Carson. While a heroic image or reputation of Carson is expressed in the earlier, 1968, biography by Harvey Carter, the older narrative has been revised by both Sides and Roberts: In 1968, Carter stated, "In respect to his actual exploits and his actual character, however, Carson was not overrated. If history has to single out one person from among the Mountain Men to receive the admiration of later generations, Carson is the best choice. He had far more of the good qualities and fewer of the bad qualities than anyone else in that varied lot of individuals." In 2000, David Roberts wrote, "Carson's trajectory, over three and a half decades, from thoughtless killer of Apaches and Blackfeet to defender and champion of the Utes, marks him out as one of the few frontiersmen whose change of heart toward the Indians, born not of missionary theory but of first-hand experience, can serve as an exemplar for the more enlightened policies that sporadically gained the day in the twentieth century." In 2006, Sides said that Carson believed the Native Americans needed reservations as a way of physically separating and shielding them from white hostility and white culture. He is said to have viewed the raids on white settlements as driven by desperation, "committed from absolute necessity when in a starving condition". Indian hunting grounds were disappearing as waves of white settlers filled the region.

A final statement from biographer Roberts in 2000 was "the fate in recent years of Kit Carson's reputation makes for a more perverse lesson in the vicissitudes of fame."

== See also ==
- Kit Carson Scouts

== Bibliography ==
- Carter, Harvey Lewis (1990). Dear Old Kit: The Historical Christopher Carson. Norman: University of Oklahoma Press. ISBN 978-0-8061-2253-3.
- Cleland, Robert Glass (1950). This Reckless Breed of Men: The Trappers and Fur Traders of the Southwest. New York City: Knopf.
- Guild, Thelma S.; Carter, Harvey L. (1988). Kit Carson: A Pattern for Heroes. University of Nebraska Press. ISBN 978-0-8032-7027-5.
- Hopkins, Virginia (1988). Pioneers of the Old West. New York, NY: Crown Publishers, Inc. ISBN 0-517-64930-6.
- Reidhead, S.J. "Kit Carson: The Legendary Frontiersman Remains an American Hero" HistoryNet.com June 12, 2006
- Roberts, David (2001). A newer world: Kit Carson, John C. Fremont and the claiming of the American west. New York: Touchstone. ISBN 978-0-7432-2576-2.
- Sides, Hampton (2006). Blood and Thunder. Doubleday. ISBN 9780307387677.
- Roberts, S. A., Roberts, C. A., & Chilton, K. (2004). A history of New Mexico. Albuquerque: University of New Mexico Press.
- Sabine, Edwin L. (1914). Kit Carson days (1809–1868). Chicago : A. C. McClurg & Co.
