= Kit Carson Mesa =

Mountain in New Mexico, United States

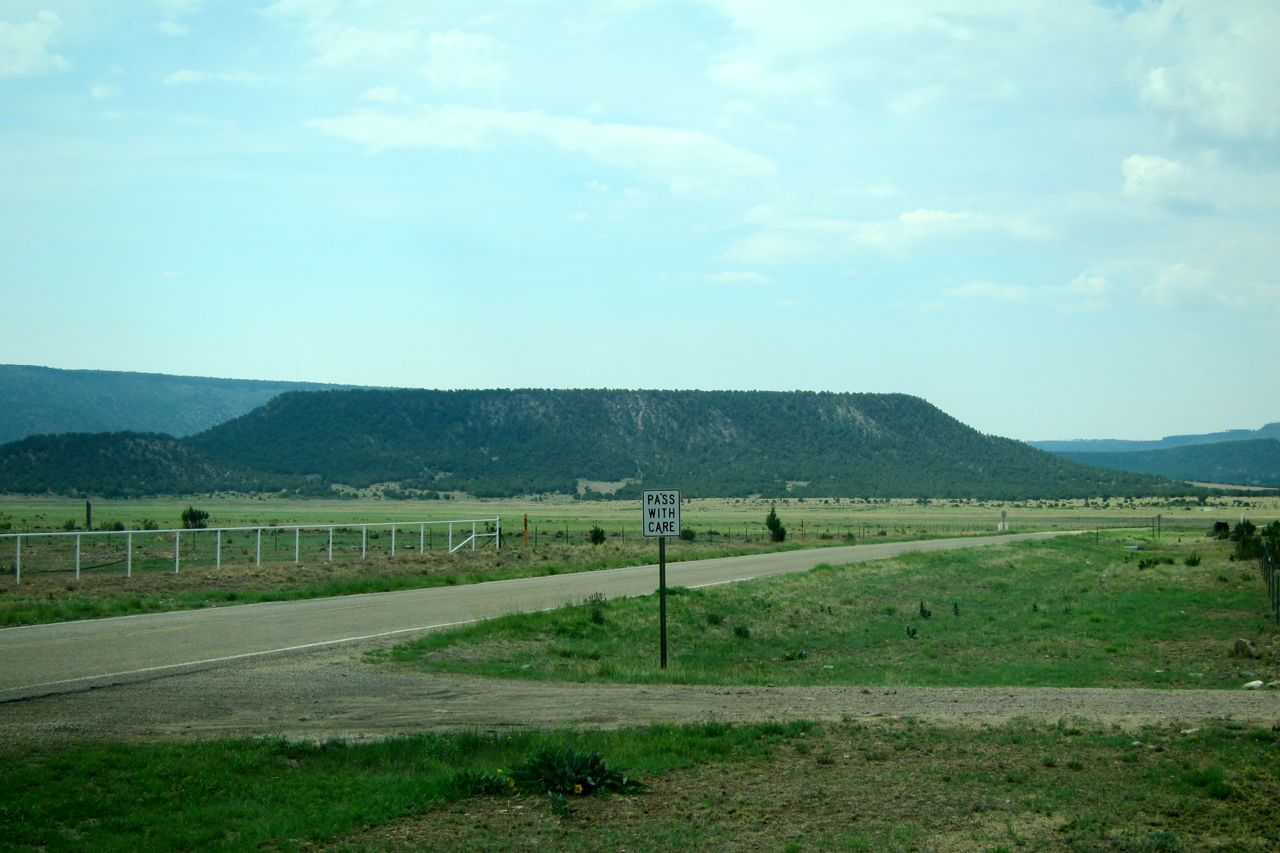
- Mesa viewed from Rayado Turnaround, Philmont Scout Ranch
- Interactive map of Kit Carson Mesa
- Location: Colfax County, New Mexico, New Mexico, United States
- Nearest city: Rayado, New Mexico
- Coordinates: 36.3464248°N 104.9266674°W
- Elevation: 6,818 feet (2,078 m)

Kit Carson Mesa is the name of a mesa near Rayado in Colfax County, New Mexico. New Mexico State Road 21 runs adjacent to the mesa. It is named after Kit Carson, who is said to have been the first English speaking traveler to visit the town of Rayado.

== See also ==
- Philmont Scout Ranch
- Miami, New Mexico
