= Pioneer Fountain =

Fountain and statue in Denver, Colorado, U.S.

- Pioneer Monument
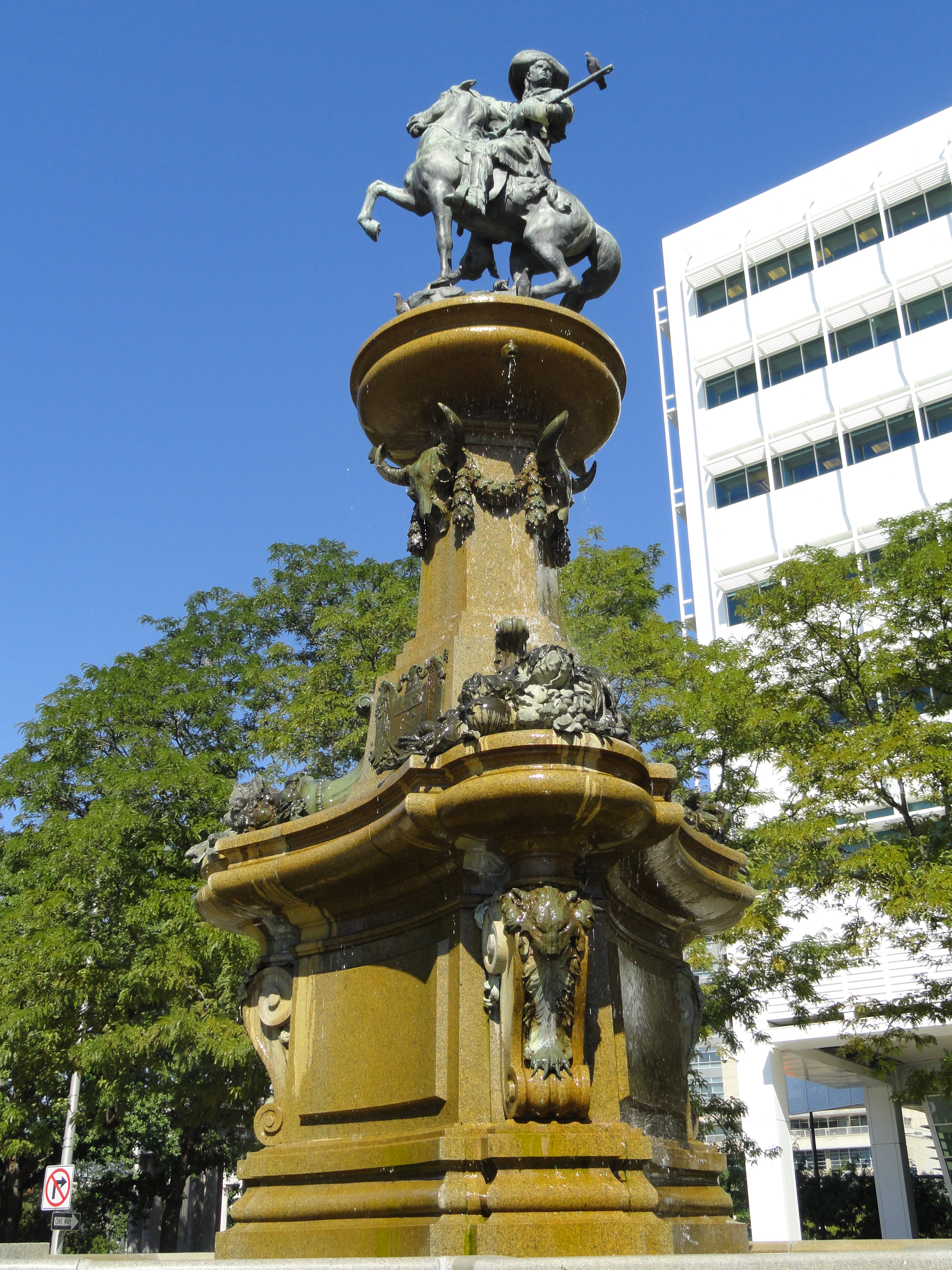
- The monument in 2011
- Artist: Frederick William MacMonnies
- Location: Denver, Colorado, U.S.
- 39.7403°N 104.9876°W

Pioneer Fountain, also known as Pioneer Monument, is a fountain and sculpture by Frederick William MacMonnies, installed in Denver, Colorado, United States.

In the original version of the monument, which was commissioned in 1904, an Indian warrior appeared at the top of the fountain, but the Denver business community loudly protested, and the Indian figure was soon replaced with a statue of Kit Carson. The statue of Carson was temporarily removed in June 2020. Indigenous activists had long criticized the glorification of Carson, who led a violent campaign to expel Navajo people from the American West. The Denver Parks and Recreation department described their removal of the statue as a "precautionary measure to keep it from being torn down."
