= Rayado, New Mexico =

Unincorporated community in New Mexico, United States

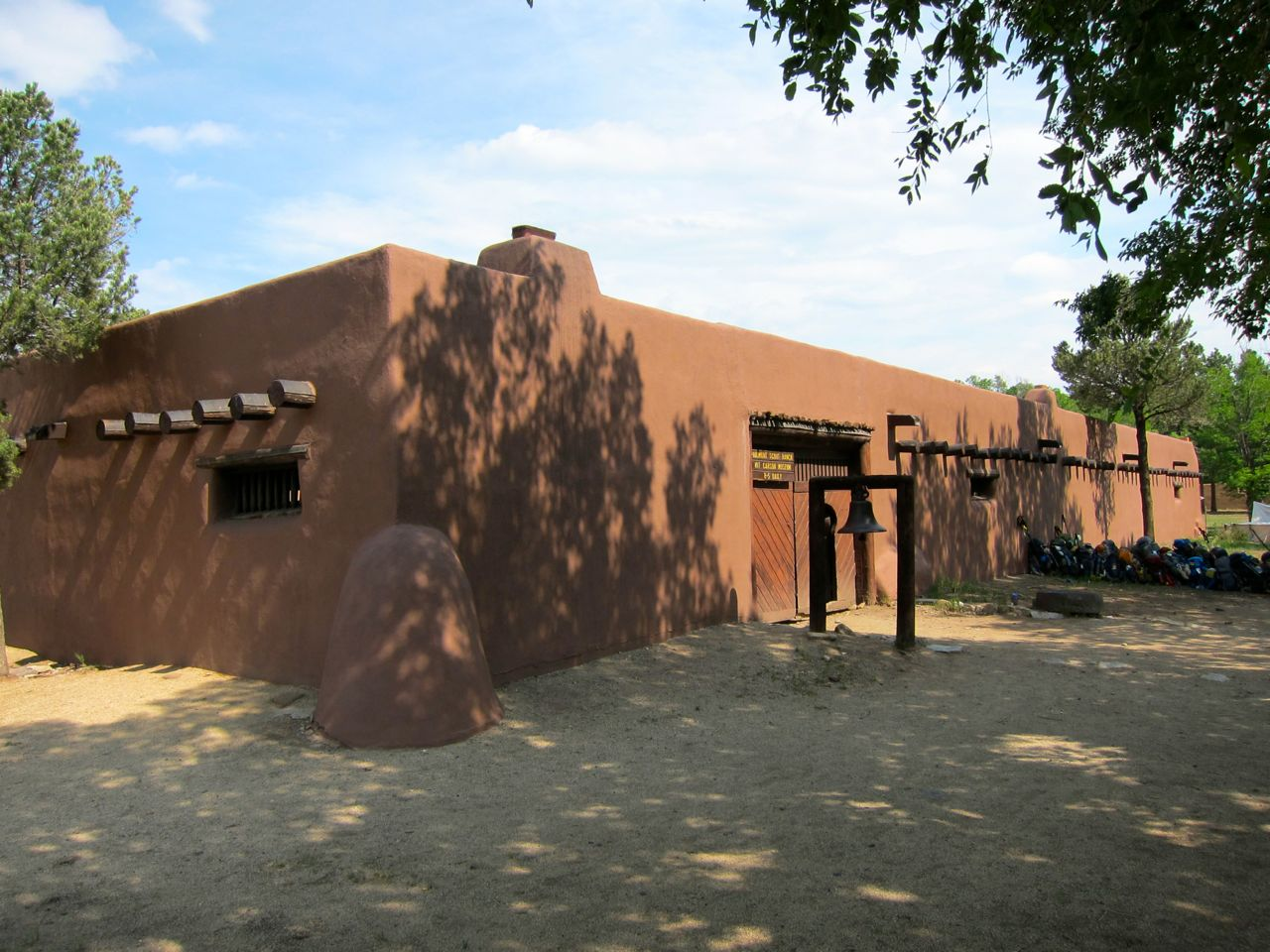
- Kit Carson Museum, Rayado, New Mexico
- Interactive map of Rayado, New Mexico
- Coordinates: 36°22′07″N 104°55′37″W
- Country: United States
- State: New Mexico
- County: Colfax
- Elevation: 6,510 ft (1,980 m)
- GNIS feature ID: 915884

Rayado (uncommonly Reyado or Ryado) was the first permanent settlement in Colfax County, New Mexico, United States and an important stop on the Santa Fe Trail. The name Rayado derives from the Spanish term for "streaked", perhaps in reference to the lot lines marked out by Lucien Maxwell.

Some of the land in the townsite was purchased by Waite Phillips in the 1920s and Phillips later donated it to the Boy Scouts of America and it became part of the Philmont Scout Ranch.

Today, Rayado is the home of the Kit Carson Museum, the Maxwell-Abreu house, the Martinez house, the Holy Child chapel, and La Posta, a Santa Fe Trail stage stop dating from the 1850s.

== Background ==
Rayado is located where the mountain branch of the Santa Fe Trail intersects with the Cimarron Trail to Fort Leavenworth.

Rayado is at 6,509 feet (1,984 m), along State Route 21 at the extreme southeast corner of Philmont Scout Ranch. One mile to the south is a classic southwestern butte, called Kit Carson Mesa.

Rayado Mesa is located 5 miles (8.0 km) southeast of Rayado and Rayado Peak at 9,805 feet (2,989 m) is located 7 miles (11 km) west of Rayado on the Philmont Scout Ranch.

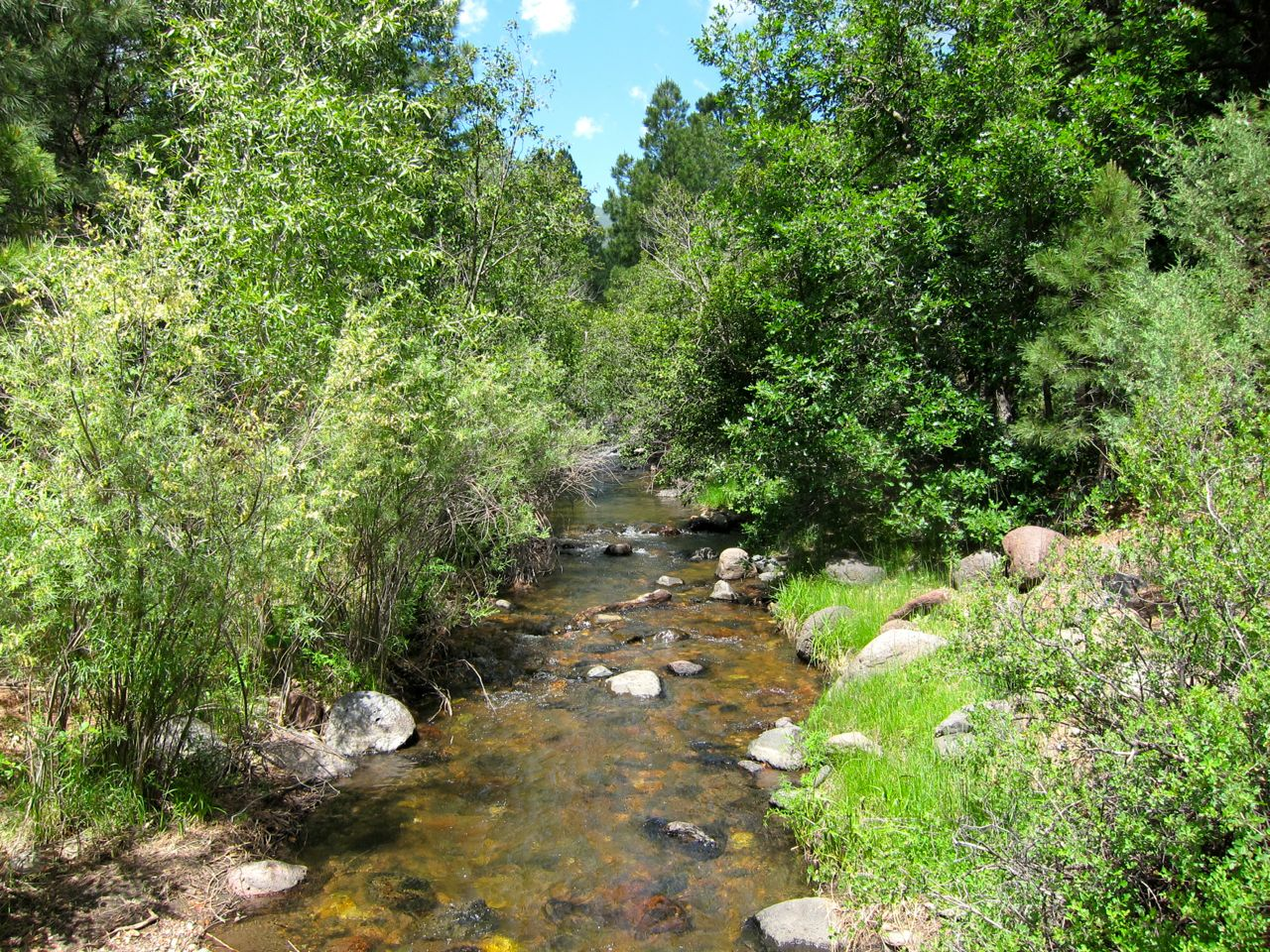
Rayado Creek at Abreu Camp, Philmont Scout Ranch, New Mexico

Rayado was founded by Lucien Maxwell in 1848 at the end of the Mexican–American War, as the first plains settlement in New Mexico east of the mountain valleys of the Sangre de Cristo Mountains. Because the plains were still subject to raids by Apache, Comanche and other Indians, he had difficulty attracting settlers, so he convinced Kit Carson to move down from Taos in 1849 to lend an air of safety to the enterprise.

Maxwell married his bride Luis Beaubien (daughter of Carlos Beaubien) in Rayado and they lived there before moving to Cimarron. A federal garrison post was established in Rayado in 1850 and lasted until Fort Union was opened.

Jesus Gil Abreu who also married a Beaubien daughter had his Abreu Ranch house there on the banks of the Rayado Creek from 1859 until his death in 1911. There was a post office there from 1873 to 1919.

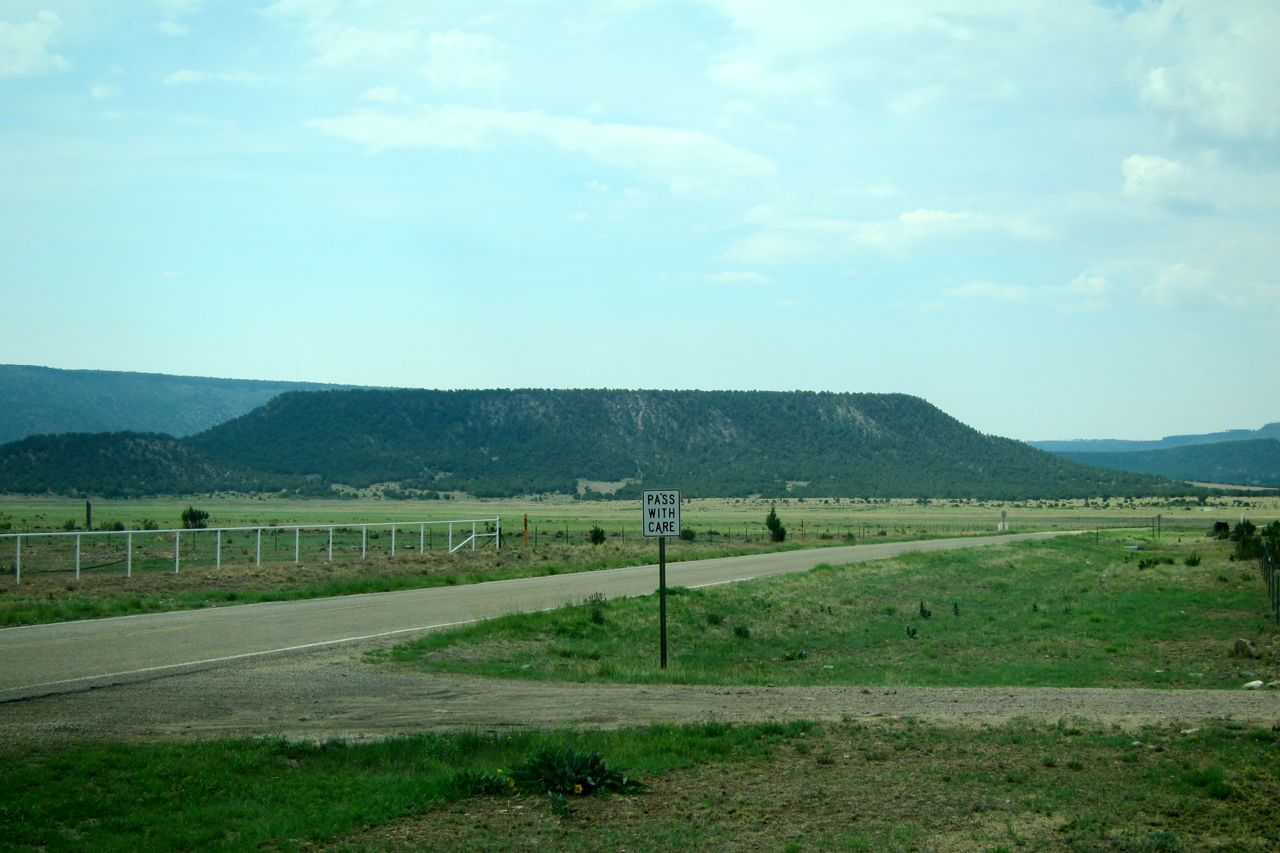
Kit Carson Mesa viewed from Rayado Turnaround, Philmont Scout Ranch

== Buildings ==
=== Kit Carson Museum ===
The Kit Carson Museum resides in a re-creation of a New Mexican Territorial Style home. The original building that stood in this location may have been built around 1850, but had deteriorated significantly by the 1940s. In 1948, Philmont Scout Ranch demolished what little remained of the structure, and proceeded to build the current building, following the original foundations and a sketch from an Abreu family member.

The building is arranged around a placita, or courtyard; this arrangement was designed to provide protection from various Native American tribes, including the Jicarilla Apache and the Ute people.

The east side of the building encompasses 4 rooms of the museum, each furnished in a historical manner. The north portion of the building is made up almost entirely by la Sala, a large hall for communal gatherings. The west portion of the building contains a staff area, not open to the public. The south part contains a Forge and other working areas.

=== Maxwell-Abreu and Martinez houses ===
The Maxwell-Abreu and Martinez houses, now on the National Register of Historic Places, were originally built as one large structure around a placita. Lucian Maxwell began construction during his residence at Rayado. As the Abreu family began using the property, many of the other rooms were demolished or dismantled for materials.

=== Chapel of the Holy Child ===
The Chapel of the Holy Child was built around 1900 by the Abreu family, and deeded to the Archdiocese of Santa Fe in 1911.

=== La Posta ===
La Posta is a stage stop built around 1850. It also functioned as a trading post and post office.
