= Enchanted Circle Scenic Byway =

Scenic byway in northern New Mexico, US

Enchanted Circle Scenic Byway National Forest Scenic Byway

Route information
- Maintained by NMDOT
- Length: 84 mi (135 km)

Location
- Country: United States
- State: New Mexico

Highway system
- Scenic Byways; National; National Forest; BLM; NPS; New Mexico State Highway System; Interstate; US; State; Scenic

The Enchanted Circle Scenic Byway is a New Mexico Scenic Byway and National Forest Scenic Byway located in Northern New Mexico. It begins and ends in Taos, New Mexico.

== Route description ==
The 84-mile (135 km) Enchanted Circle Scenic Byway makes a loop through Taos following four main highways:

- U.S. Route 64 between Eagle Nest and Taos
- NM 522 between Taos and Questa
- NM 38 between Questa, Red River, and Eagle Nest
- NM 434 between Eagle Nest and Angel Fire

The byway encircles Wheeler Peak (13,161 feet (4,011 m)) of the Sangre de Cristo Mountains. It is the tallest mountain in New Mexico. The scenic byway passes through historic towns, alongside lakes and streams, and near ski resorts and recreational parks.

=== Taos ===
Taos is the county seat of Taos County, and the largest town in the Enchanted Circle. It is notable for its historic plaza, arts and music scene, and the nearby Taos Pueblo UNESCO World Heritage Site. Recreational opportunities include rafting on the Rio Grande River and skiing and snowboarding at Taos Ski Valley.

=== Questa & Red River ===
North of Taos, NM 522 meets NM 38 at Questa, where Red River recreational opportunities include picnic facilities, fishing, and self-guided tours. The town of Questa is known for its artisans whose works are found at the Artesanos de Questa and historic santos and retablos are at the St. Anthony's Church. (Note: Side trips north of Taos include the Rio Grande Gorge Bridge, John Dunn Bridge, D.H. Lawrence Ranch, the village of Arroyo Hondo, Taos Ski Valley, and the Carson National Forest.)

Northeast of Questa, the Rio Grande and Red Rivers intersect in the Wild Rivers Recreation Area. East of Questa is the Red River Valley—where there had been copper, lead, silver and gold mining. The town of Red River offers, shopping, a ski resort, and ATV rentals. Traveling east on New Mexico State Road 38 (NM 38) is Bobcat Pass (9,820 feet (2,990 m)) which leads into the Moreno Valley and a view of the north side of Mount Wheeler. (Note: A side trip off of NM 38 is Elizabethtown, the ghost town of the former mining settlement.)

=== Angel Fire ===
At the eastern edge of the scenic byway is the Moreno Valley, which lies between Eagle Nest and Angel Fire. At the southernmost point of the valley is the Vietnam Veterans Memorial State Park. A ski resort and golf course are located south of the park on NM 434 in the village of Angel Fire. The ski resort's chairlift is used during the summer by hikers, sightseers and mountain bikers. From Angel Fire, west on US 64 is the Palo Flechado Pass (9,101 feet (2,774 m)) with a distant view of San Juan. Campsites, canyon trails, picnic areas, and artist's studios are located in the Canyon of the Rio Fernando de Taos.

== History ==
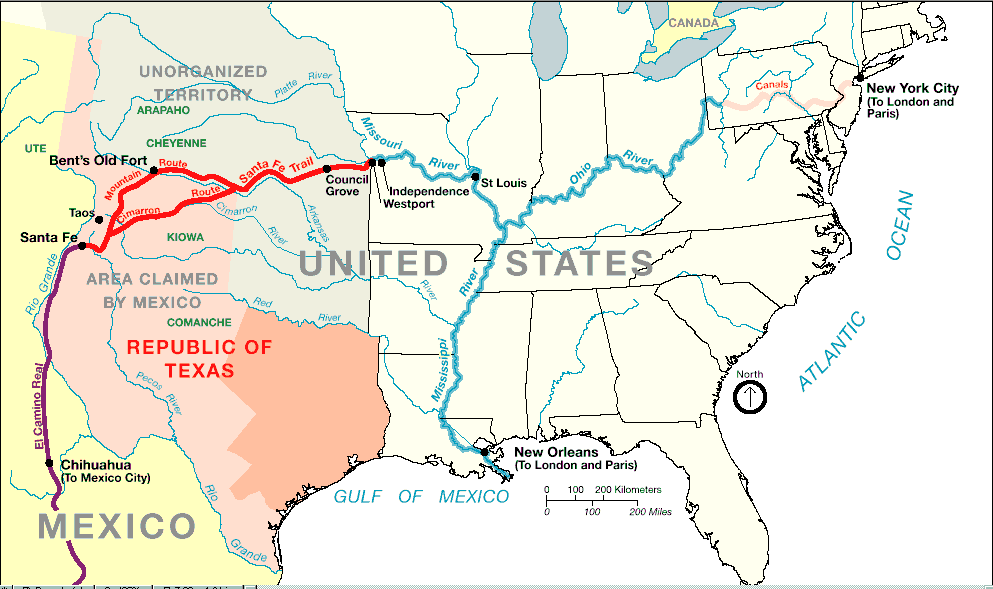
Santa Fe Trail through New Mexico

=== Early trails ===
The earliest trails used by Plains Indians and Puebloan peoples were those created by buffalo and were followed for hunting. The buffalo were considered "the best civil engineers in the world" for their ability to find the easiest, lowest paths through the mountains. The Old Kiowa Trail, still used today by Native Americans on horseback, is at the base of the Rocky Mountains. An old Navajo Trail criss-crossed the Rio Grande before heading west at Warmsley Crossing (John Dunn Bridge at Arroyo Hondo) There were additional trails that radiated out of Taos from Taos Plaza.

=== Trails of the 19th century ===
A key trail into Taos was "The Old Taos Trail", which began at the Bent's Fort on the Arkansas River in Colorado, west of the Spanish Peaks, through Sangre de Cristo Pass (west of Walsenburg, Colorado), Old La Veta Pass and into Questa area (NM 522/NM38 area).

It came into Taos at either Taos Pueblo road or half a mile west on Couse Hill. Another route into Taos was along the Cimarron Route. It was this route that most wagon trains entered into the Rio de Fernando canyon valley. The two routes are the "mountain route" and the "Cimarron Route" of the Santa Fe Trail. One of the Cimarron Mountain Routes paralleled the present U.S. Route 64 from I-25 to Cimarron. Trails branched off of the Cimarron Route into several communities. A branch of the route from Bent's Fort went into Taos in or after the founding of the Santa Fe Trail in 1821. The first wagon train was led by Charles Bent in 1831. Bent, the brother of William Bent of Bent's Fort, became the most successful merchant in Taos before being made governor of New Mexico.

=== Highways from the 20th century ===
History of individual highways:

- U.S. Route 64. In 1927 the road into Taos from the northeast was highway 485, a branch of 85 from Raton, New Mexico. It ran south east from Cimarron to Taos and continued south to Santa Fe. In 1931, U.S. 485 was replaced by U.S. Route 64. In 1974 the route of 64 changed from Taos, and rather than taking a southerly route, it traveled north and west over the mountains of Tres Piedras, replacing the former NM 111 and NM 553 highways.
- New Mexico State Road 38. The highway was named NM 38 in or before 1912 for the road between Questa and Eagle Nest.
- New Mexico State Road 434. The road runs south from U.S. Route 64 south to Mora. It was a part of NM-38 when the highway was extended south of Eagle Nest by 1917 and at least into the 1950s. It was renumbered to NM 434 in 1988 to eliminate a concurrent section with U.W. 64 and NM 38.
- New Mexico State Road 522. It was New Mexico State Road 3 from 1930. It was renumbered NM 522 in 1988. North of Costilla at the Colorado state line it becomes CO Highway 159.

=== Scenic byway designation ===
The Enchanted Circle Scenic Byway was named a New Mexico Scenic Byways on July 31, 1998.

It was designated as a National Forest Scenic Byway by the U.S. Forest Service on December 14, 1989.

== Gallery ==
Enchanted Circle Scenic Byway

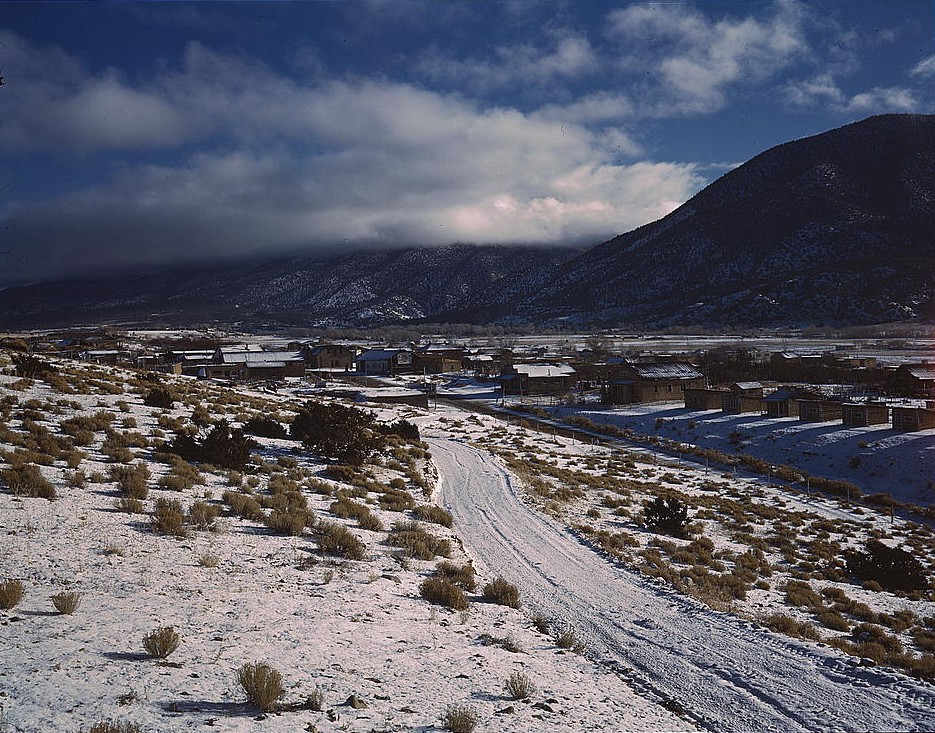
Questa in 1943

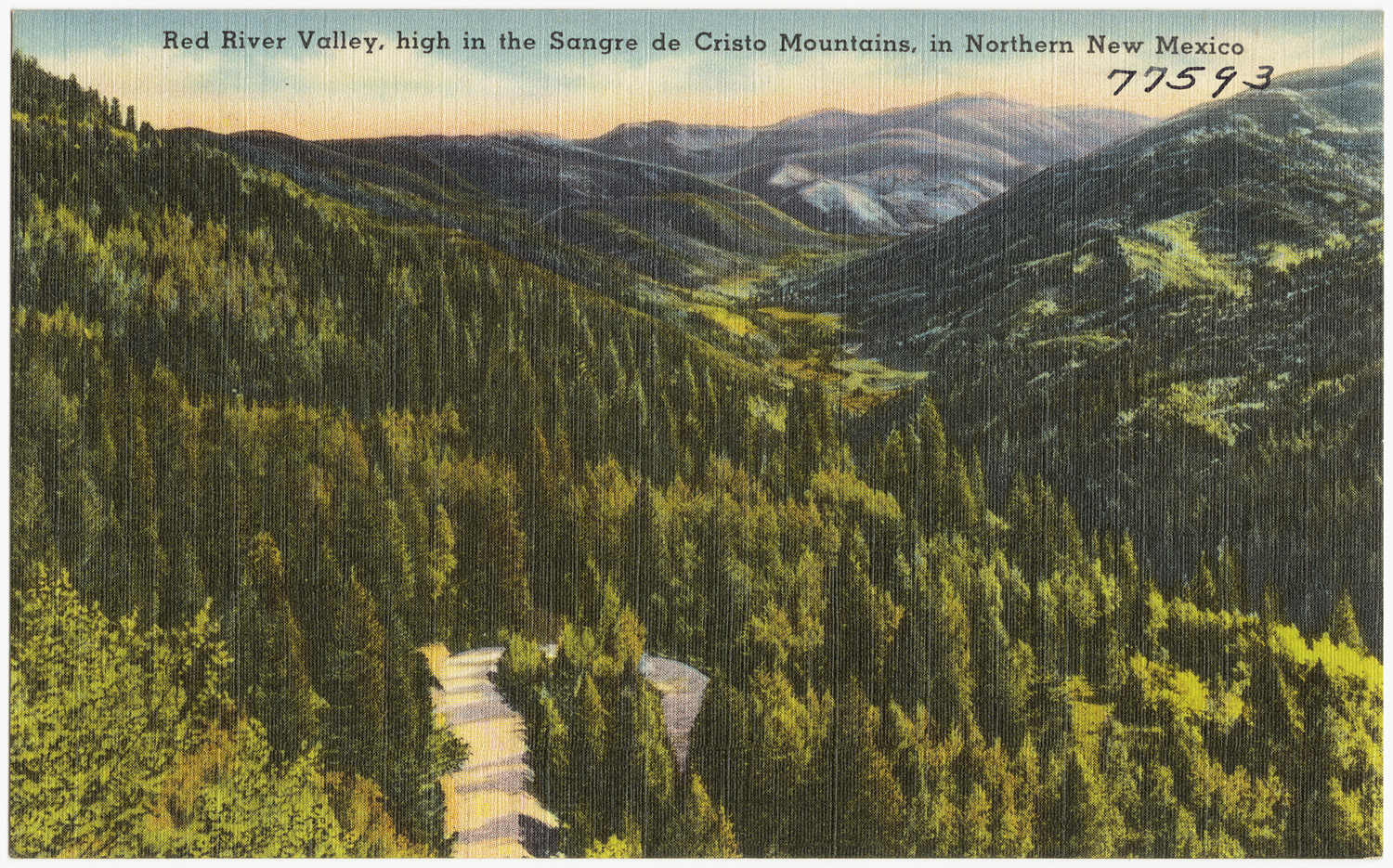
Red River Valley

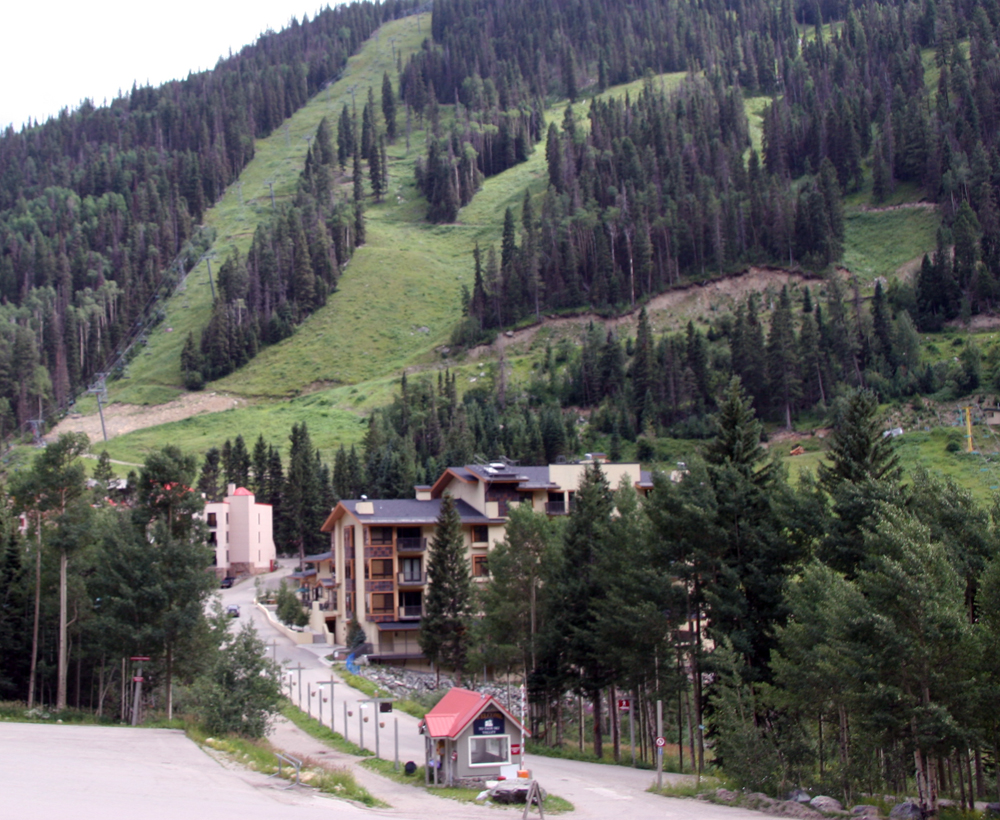
Taos Ski Valley

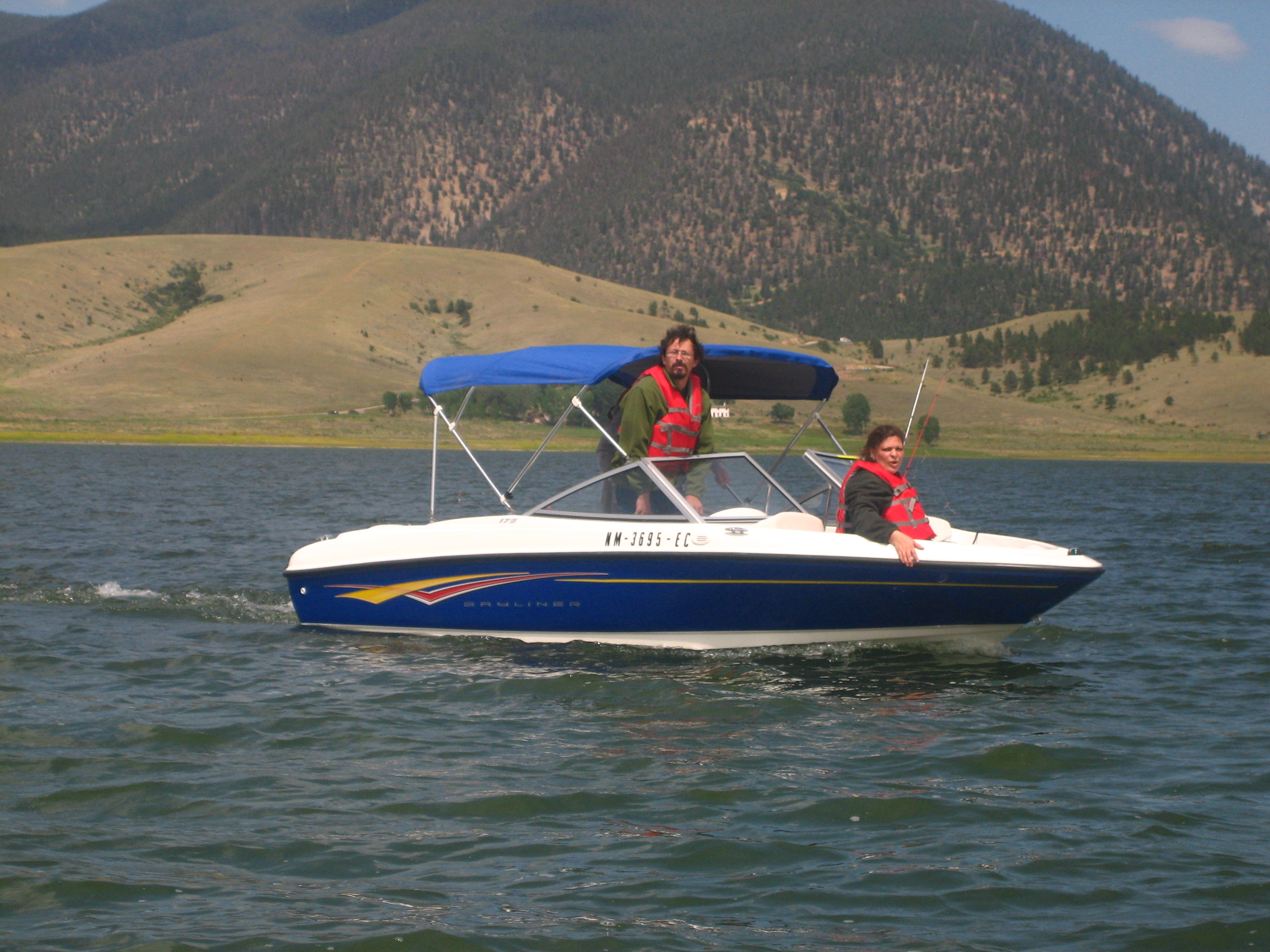
Boating on Eagle Nest Lake

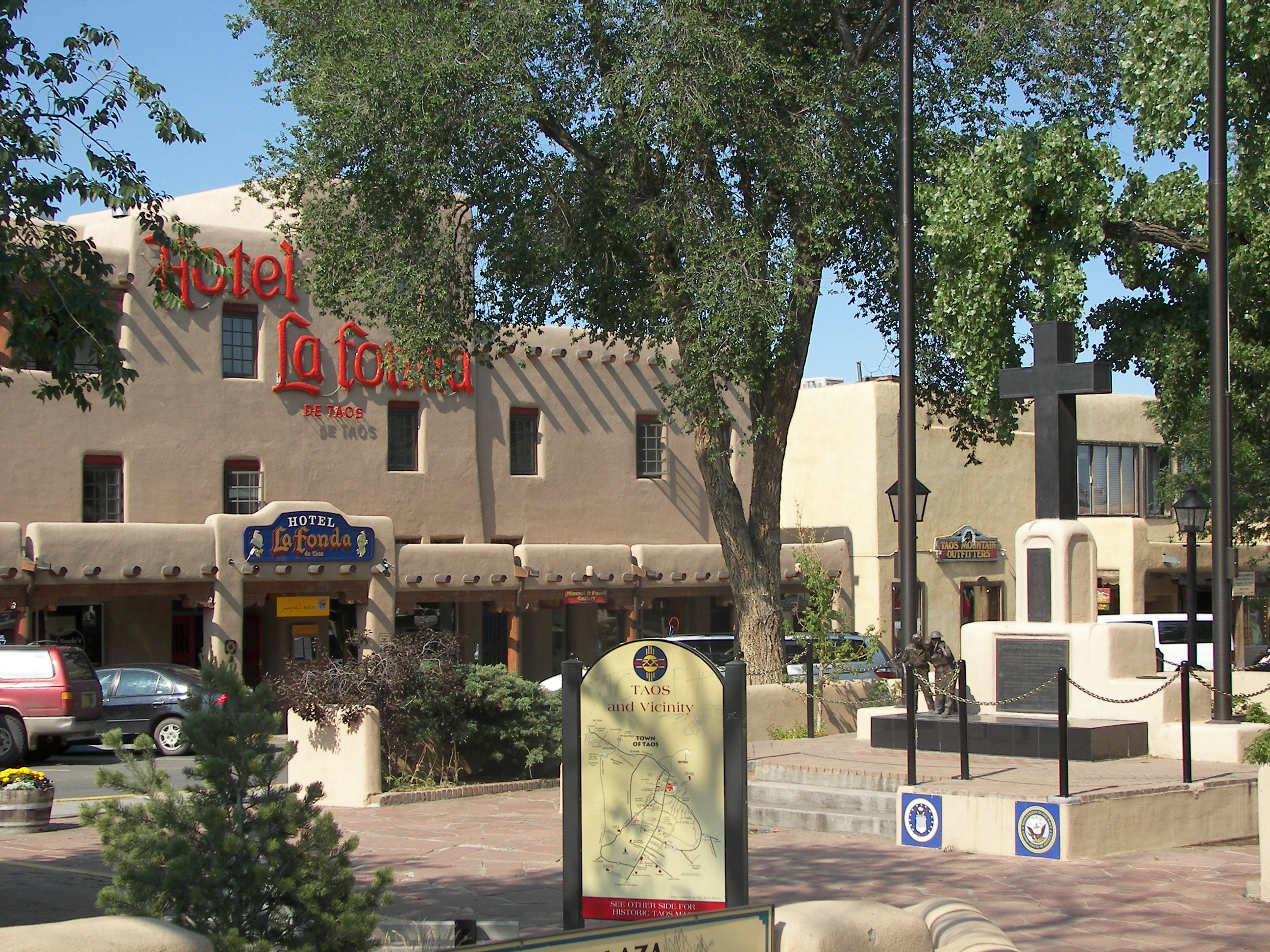
Taos

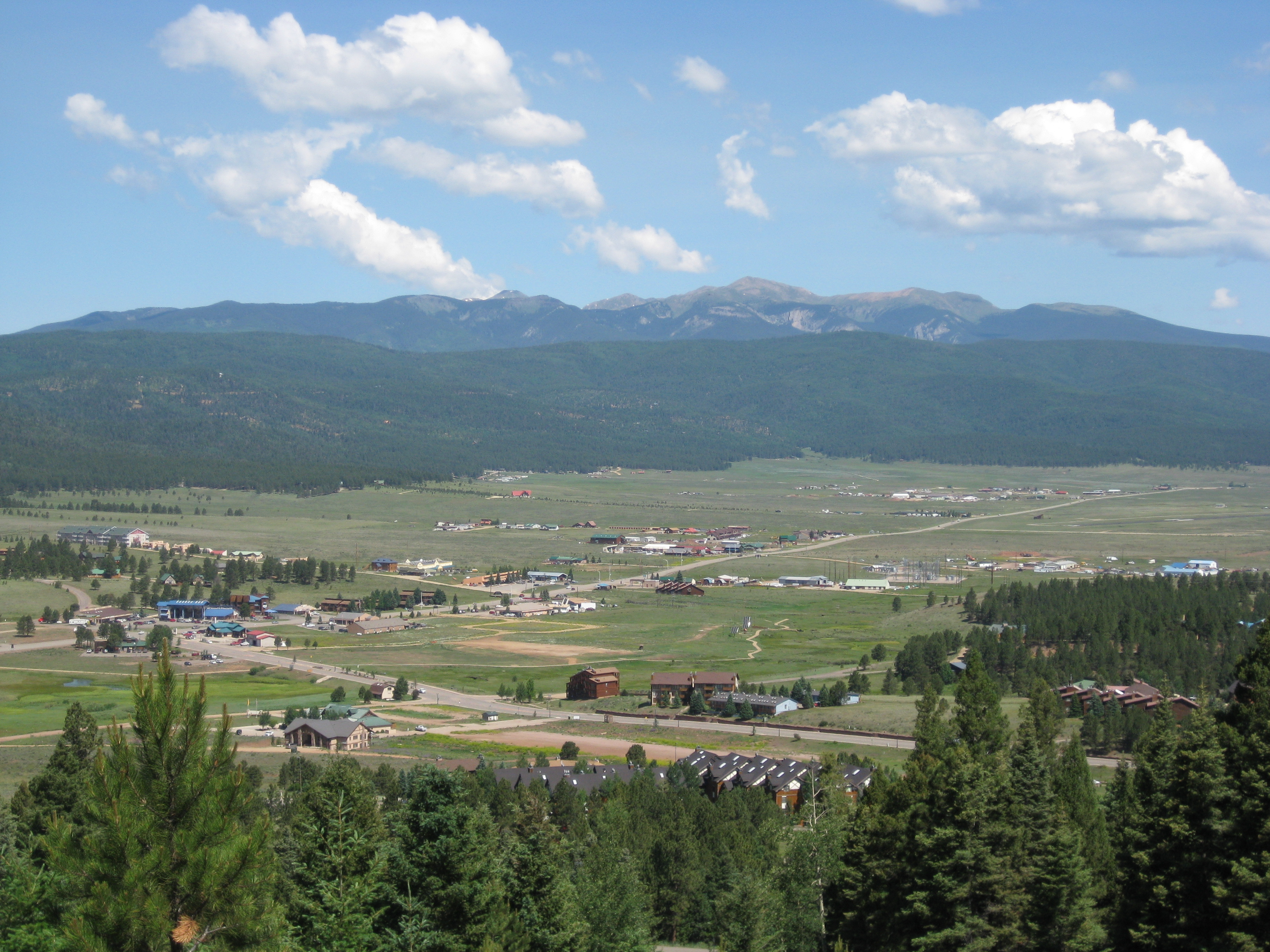
Angel Fire

== Popular culture ==
The movies Easy Rider and Butch Cassidy and the Sundance Kid were filmed in the area.

== See also ==
- National Register of Historic Places listings in Taos County, New Mexico
- Scenic highways in the United States
