= New Mexico State Road 578 =

Highway in New Mexico, United States

State Road 578
- NM 578 highlighted in red

Route information
- Maintained by NMDOT
- Length: 6.437 mi (10.359 km)

Major junctions
- South end: End of state maintenance near Red River
- North end: NM 38 in Red River

Location
- Country: United States
- State: New Mexico
- Counties: Taos

Highway system
- New Mexico State Highway System; Interstate; US; State; Scenic
| ← NM 576 | → NM 580 |

State Road 578 (NM 578) is a 6.437-mile-long (10.359 km) state highway in the US state of New Mexico. NM 578's southern terminus is at the end of state maintenance south-southeast of Red River, and the northern terminus is at NM 38 in Red River.

== Major intersections ==
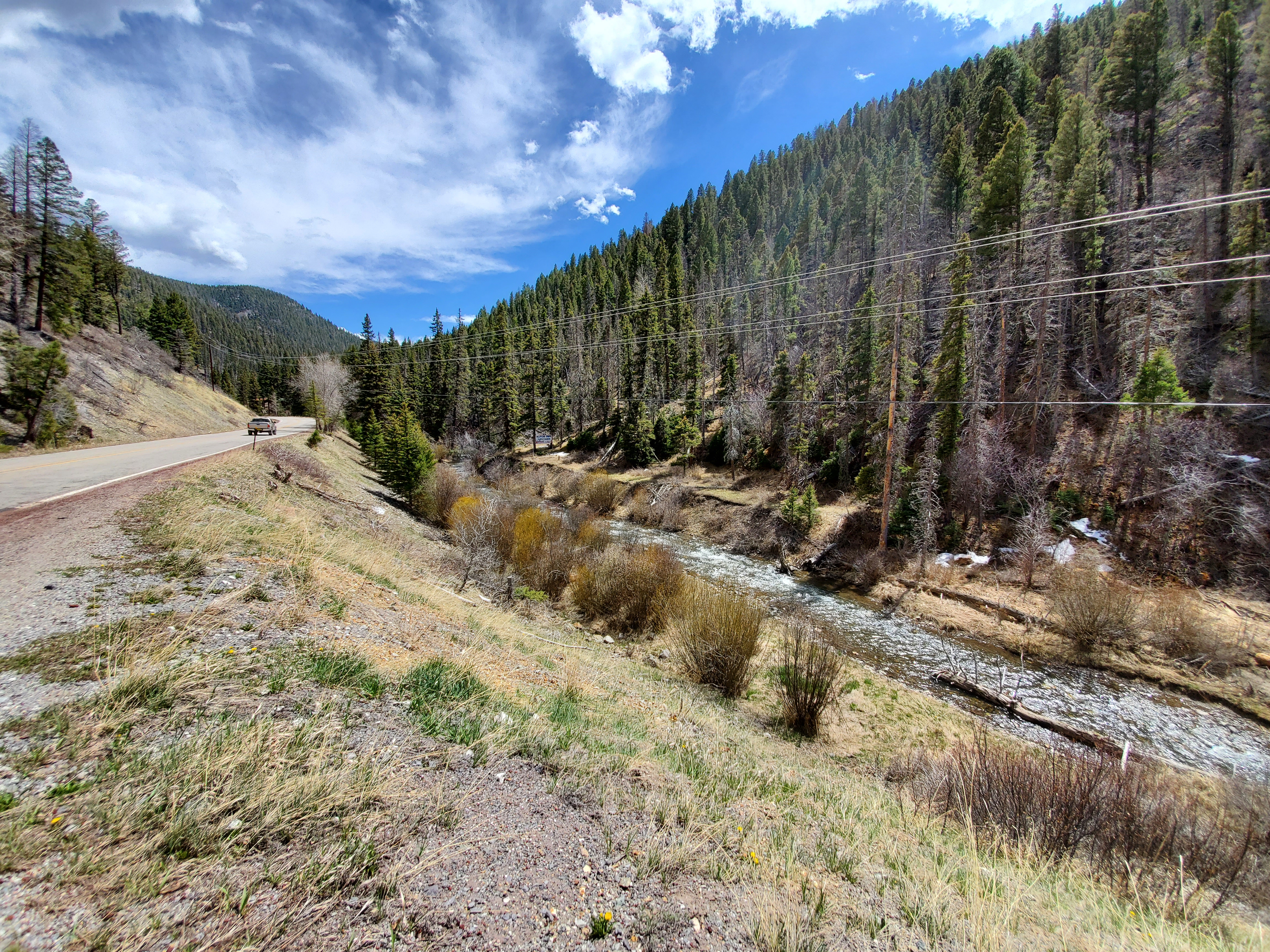
New Mexico State Road 578 and the Red River, Taos County, New Mexico, United States, 27 April 2020

The entire route is in Taos County.

| Location | mi | km | Destinations | Notes |
|---|---|---|---|---|
| Red River | 0.000 | 0.000 | NM 38 (Main Street) – Red River, Eagle Nest, Raton | Northern terminus |
| | 6.437 | 10.359 | End of state maintenance | Southern terminus |
1.000 mi = 1.609 km; 1.000 km = 0.621 mi
