= Bobcat Pass =

Low point in the Rockies outside Taos, New Mexico

Coordinates: 36°42′10″N 105°20′40″W

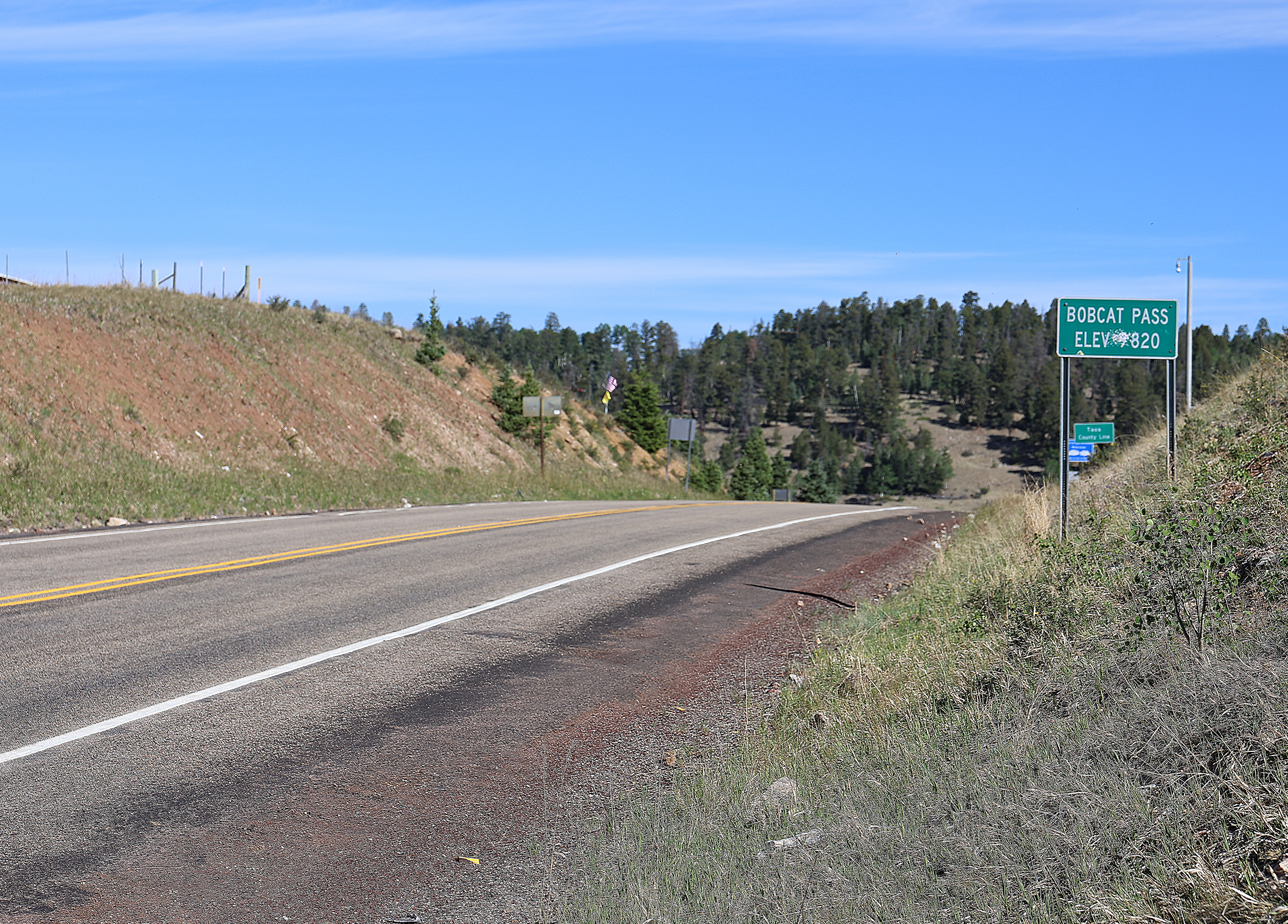
Bobcat Pass (2026)

Bobcat Pass is a mountain pass located in Taos and Colfax counties on the Enchanted Circle Scenic Byway in New Mexico, U.S.

== Geography ==
At 9,836 feet (2,998 meters) in elevation, it is the highest mountain pass in New Mexico. It is located on NM 38 between Eagle Nest, New Mexico and Red River on the boundary of the Carson National Forest. The pass is the head of the Bobcat Creek, named for the frequency of the bobcat in the area.

== Description ==
Wildlife in the area include elk, which may be seen about 6 in the evening. Cross-country skiing and snowshoeing are available at the summit of the pass.
