= Moreno Valley (New Mexico) =

Valley in New Mexico, United States

- Location within New Mexico
- Floor elevation: 8,252 ft (2,515 m)
- Length: 43 km (27 mi) N-S
- Width: 8 km (5.0 mi) W-E
- Area: 344 km^{2} (133 mi^{2})

Geography
- Country: United States
- State: New Mexico
- District: Colfax County
- Coordinates: 36°32′1.11″N 105°16′20.03″W
- Traversed by: U.S. Highway 64; State Road 38; State Road 434
- River: Cimarron River (Canadian River tributary)

Location
- Interactive map of Moreno Valley

Moreno Valley, elevation 8,252 feet (2,515 meters), is a high mountain valley in Colfax County, New Mexico, U.S. The valley lies between the Sangre de Cristo Mountains to the west and the Cimarron Range to the east. The valley stretches 27 miles (43 kilometers) north to south and is about 5.0 miles (8 kilometers) wide. The area is popular with tourists and offers skiing in the winter and outdoor activities in the summer. Part of the valley lies adjacent to the Carson National Forest, and a state park in the valley features a large lake that offers fishing and water activities.

== Geography ==
The valley trends north to south and is surrounded on all sides by peaks of the Southern Rocky Mountains. The Cimarron River, a tributary of the Canadian River, is dammed on the valley's east side, impounding Eagle Nest Lake.

== Populated places ==
The valley has two incorporated villages, Eagle Nest and Angel Fire. Elizabethtown, an unincorporated community, a 19th century mining town and a former ghost town, sits north of Eagle Nest.

== Recreation ==
A ski resort, the Angel Fire Resort, elevation 8,600 feet (2,600 meters), offers summer activities such as golf and lift rides in addition to winter activities including skiing, snowboarding, snowmobiling, and ice fishing.

The area around the town of Angel Fire offers diverse summer activities, including bicycle riding, horseback riding, bird watching, fly fishing, hiking, hunting, and off-roading.

== Protected areas ==
Carson National Forest borders the valley on the north and west. Eagle Nest Lake State Park is popular with anglers, including ice fishers, and boaters.

== Transportation ==
=== Highways ===
The Enchanted Circle Scenic Byway passes through the Moreno Valley. In doing so, it uses the valley's main highways, including U.S. Highway 64, New Mexico State Road 522, New Mexico State Road 38 and New Mexico State Road 434. The byway makes a grand circle around Wheeler Peak, New Mexico's highest mountain, which is visible from parts of the valley.

=== Airport ===
The Angel Fire Airport chiefly serves private and charter planes, but starting in 2024, Advanced Air offers seasonal service (in winter) to and from Albuquerque International Sunport.
