= Cimarron Municipal Schools =

School district in New Mexico, United States

Location
- 165 N. Collison Avenue, Cimarron, New Mexico 87714

District information
- Type: Public
- Motto: Excellence in Education
- Superintendent: Matthew Tyner
- Schools: Cimarron Elementary-Middle School, Cimarron High School, Eagle Nest Elementary-Middle School

Other information
- Website: Cimarron Municipal Schools

Cimarron Municipal Schools is a school district headquartered in Cimarron, New Mexico, which is located in Colfax County.

The district includes the municipalities of Cimarron, Angel Fire, and Eagle Nest. It operates three schools: Cimarron Elementary-Middle School, Eagle Nest Elementary-Middle School, and Cimarron High School.

== History ==
In 1983, 32 students from Red River, a community in the Questa School District, went to Cimarron Municipal Schools, with 22 going to the Eagle Nest elementary school and 10 to the Cimarron secondary school.

In 1996, construction work was done in several of the district's schools.

In 1997 and in 1998, the enrollment count was 672.
