= Moreno Valley =

Moreno Valley may refer to:

- Moreno Valley, California, a city in Riverside County
- Moreno Valley (New Mexico), a valley in Colfax County
