= Music from Angel Fire =

Music from Angel Fire, (MFAF) is the first chamber music festival in New Mexico designed to serve the artistic needs of rural northern New Mexico communities. This touring summer chamber music festival currently produces 15 outstanding concerts in Angel Fire, Taos, Raton, and Las Vegas, NM mid-August through the day before Labor Day. The Festival's mission is to bring to these communities the highest standard of artistic excellence in the classical chamber music repertoire presented by world class artists with emerging and established careers. Music from Angel Fire concerts are broadcast by American Public Media, Performance Today, throughout the United States.

The Artistic Director Ida Kavafian, renowned international violinist, has set programs of varied repertoire from the Baroque to the Contemporary. The Festival also produces two professional family/youth concerts for the young people of Taos and Colfax counties.

== Bruce E. Howden, Jr. American Composers Project ==
In continuing its commitment to contemporary classical music, each year, Music from Angel Fire engages an American composer to write a new composition and to be in residence for the world premiere of the commissioned work. For the festival's 25th Anniversary 2008 Season, the renowned composer Joan Tower was commissioned to write a string quartet to be performed by the Miami String Quartet.

== Music in Our Schools ==
Music from Angel Fire also maintains an active music outreach program for the communities of Red River, Taos, Raton, Angel Fire, Eagle Nest, Mora, Questa, Cimarron, Peňasco and Las Vegas. The program is the first such program in New Mexico designed to serve the rural part of the State and through this, a broad segment of the diverse population is reached. Musicians from the Young Artist Program perform 30 classroom concerts in rural area schools together with associated lectures and discussion.

== MFAF's Young Artist Program ==
Each season, the MFAF has in residence 10 to 12 selected student-musicians from the Curtis Institute of Music of Philadelphia for Music From Angel Fire's Young Artist Program. These young musicians reside in Angel Fire during the Festival season and study and publicly perform alongside the Festival's professional musicians, thereby gaining invaluable concert experience. The Program is designed for education and performance and broadens the Festival's education outreach concerts, Music in Our Schools.
