= Angel Fire Resort =

Ski resort in New Mexico, United States

- Location in New Mexico Angel Fire Resort (the United States)
- Location: Angel Fire, New Mexico, United States
- Nearest major city: Taos, New Mexico, United States
- Coordinates: 36°23′15″N 105°16′24″W
- Top elevation: 10,677 feet (3,254 m)
- Base elevation: 8,600 feet (2,600 m)
- Skiable area: 560 acres (2.3 km^{2})
- Trails: 80; 21% Beginner; 56% Intermediate; 23% Expert
- Longest run: 3.2 miles (5.1 km)
- Lift system: 7 lifts
- Terrain parks: 3
- Snowfall: 210 inches (530 cm)
- Snowmaking: 230 acres (0.93 km^{2})
- Website: www.angelfireresort.com

Angel Fire Resort is an alpine ski resort in Angel Fire, New Mexico, United States. The resort opened in 1966 and offers both winter and summer activities.

== History ==
The resort was originally used for cattle grazing. In 1966, the LeBus family converted it into a resort.

Angel Fire is a village in Colfax County, New Mexico, United States. The population was 1,216 at the 2010 census. It is a popular ski resort destination, with over 500 acres (2.0 km^{2}) of slopes. Angel Fire and nearby communities experience cold winter temperatures and mild temperatures in the summer.

To the north, off U.S. Route 64, is the Vietnam Veterans Memorial, begun by the family of fallen United States Marine David Westphall, who was killed in the Vietnam War on May 22, 1968. Angel Fire is on the Enchanted Circle Scenic Byway.

In 1984 the resort was bought by Dan R. Lasater for $19 million, who owned it through 1987. Lasater, a friend of Bill Clinton, was subsequently a minor figure in the Whitewater controversy. This led to an inquiry into Angel Fire's finances by investigators working for special counsel Robert B. Fiske and both the House banking committee and the Senate banking committee.

In 1994 Angel Fire Resort filed for bankruptcy and by 1995 a plan was being assembled to sell it to a group of Texan businessmen for $12 million. The sale was completed in November 1995.

== Amenities and activities ==
It has a golf course and over 70 runs, one of which was, in the 1990s, the "second-biggest lift-serviced vertical drop" in New Mexico, at 2050 feet. Mountain biking has also become a prominent draw, and the resort has hosted multiple events. A majority of the resort's customers are Texan, explaining the annual "Big Ol' Texas Weekend," a celebration of Texan culture.
