= Angel Fire, New Mexico =

- Village
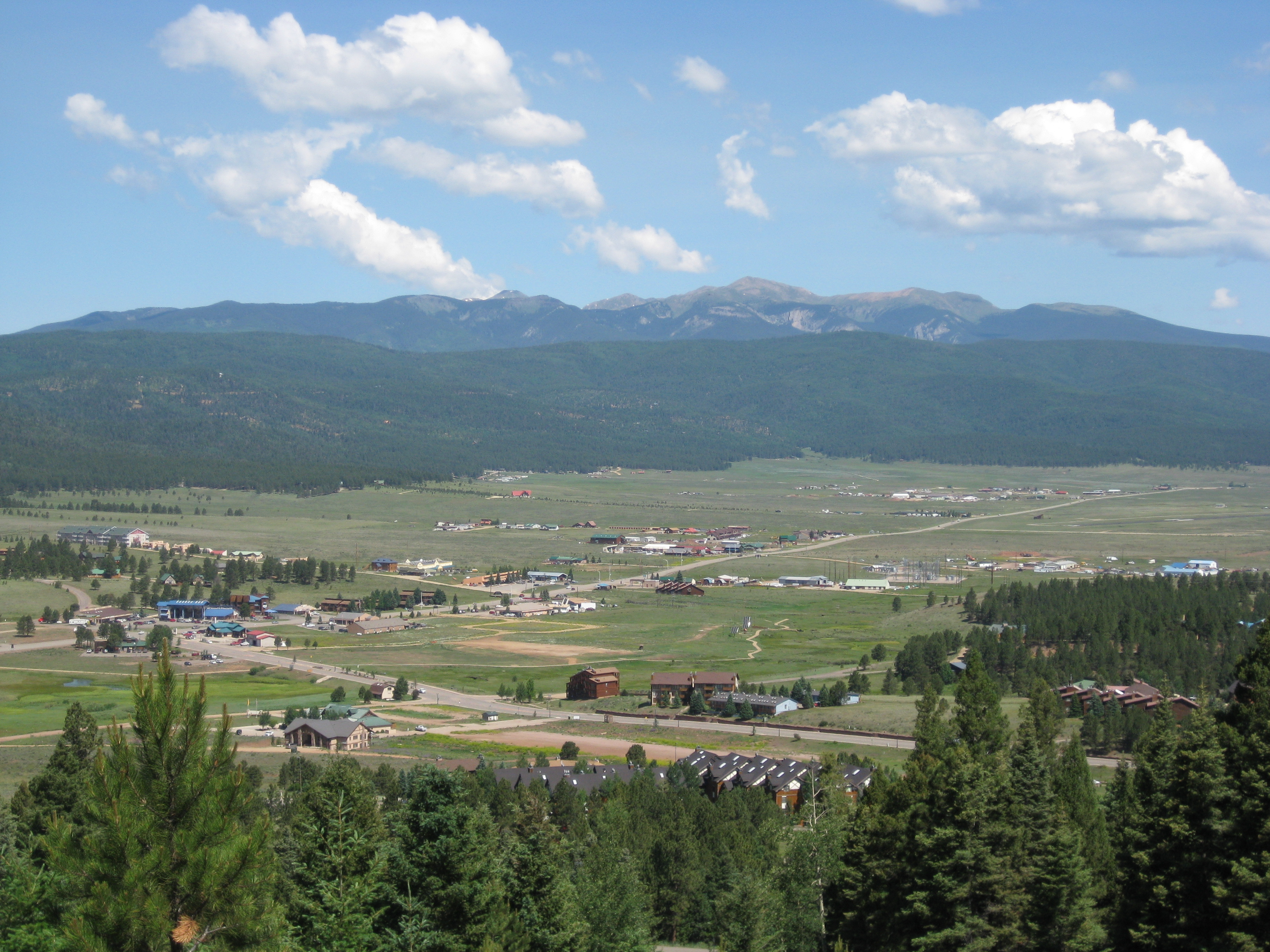
- Village of Angel Fire

- The official logo for the Village of Angel Fire
- Motto: "Reach New Heights"
- Location of Angel Fire, New Mexico

- Location in the United States
- Coordinates: 36°22′44″N 105°17′08″W
- Country: United States
- State: New Mexico
- County: Colfax
- Established: 1982
- Incorporated: 1986

Government
  - Mayor: BJ Lindsey

Area
  - Total: 28.85 sq mi (74.71 km^{2})
  - Land: 28.81 sq mi (74.61 km^{2})
  - Water: 0.039 sq mi (0.10 km^{2})
- Elevation: 8,882 ft (2,707 m)

Population (2020)
  - Total: 1,192
  - Density: 41.4/sq mi (15.98/km^{2})
- Time zone: UTC-7 (Mountain (MST))
  - Summer (DST): UTC-6 (MDT)
- ZIP code: 87710
- Area code: 575
- FIPS code: 35-03400
- GNIS feature ID: 2413529
- Website: www.angelfirenm.gov

Angel Fire is a village in Colfax County, New Mexico, United States. The population was 1,192 at the 2020 census. Angel Fire Resort is a popular skiing and snowboarding destination, with over 500 acres (2.0 km^{2}) of slopes. Angel Fire and nearby communities experience cold winter temperatures and mild temperatures in the summer.

To the north, off of U.S. Route 64, is Vietnam Veterans Memorial State Park. Angel Fire is on the Enchanted Circle Scenic Byway.

== Geography ==
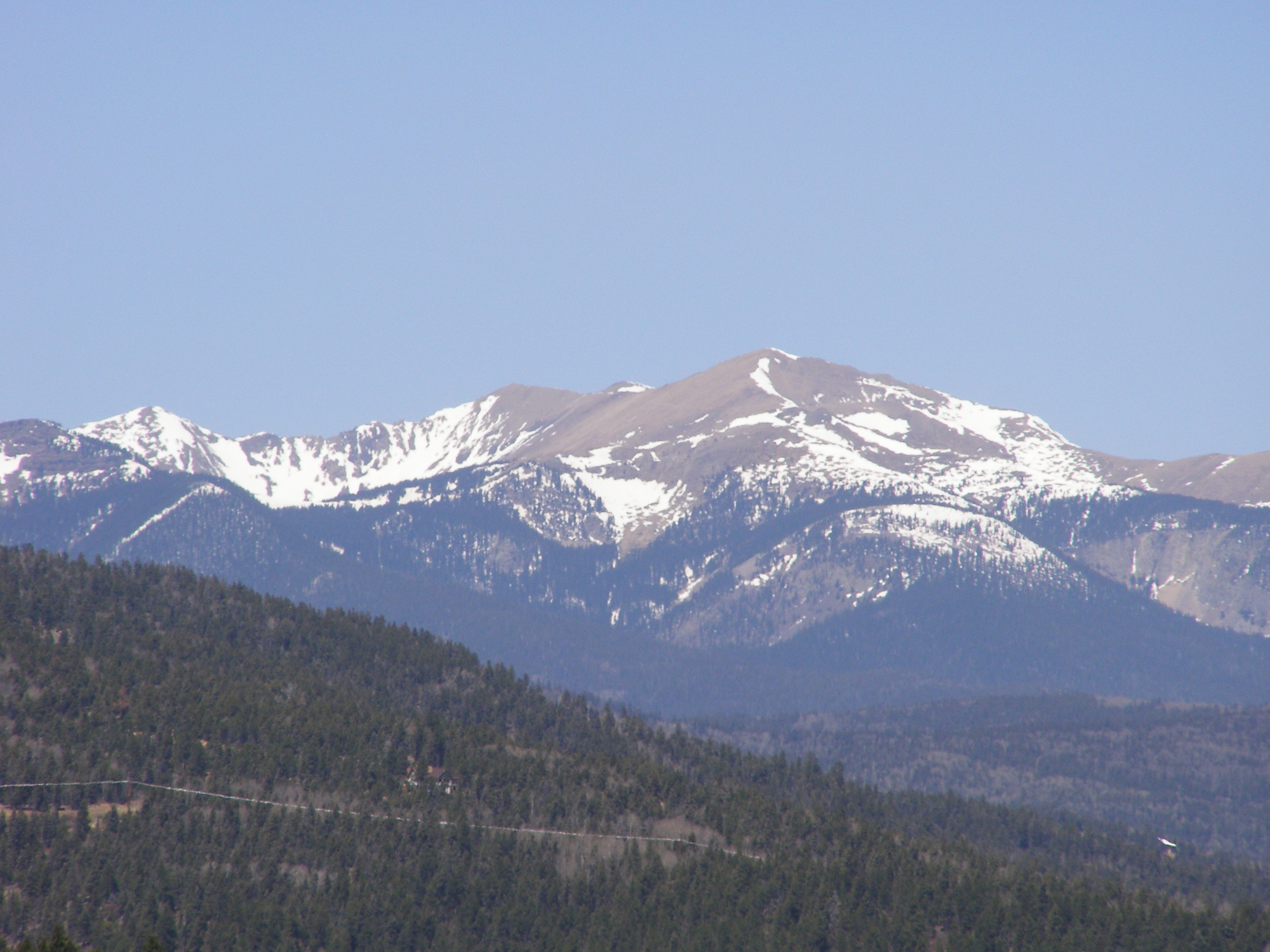
Wheeler Peak from Angel Fire

Angel Fire is located in southwestern Colfax County. The village center is in the valley of Cieneguilla Creek, with housing developments climbing mountain slopes to the east and west. Angel Fire Resort, entirely within the village limits, is on the east side of the valley, with a base elevation of 8,600 feet (2,600 m) and a summit elevation of 10,677 feet (3,254 m). Agua Fria Peak, with a summit elevation of 11,078 feet (3,377 m), rises to the southeast of the ski area; the summit is near the southeast corner of the village limits.

The village limits extend north as far as U.S. Route 64 at a point 10 miles (16 km) south of Eagle Nest. To the west, US 64 climbs over Palo Flechado Pass in the Sangre de Cristo Mountains and leads 21 miles (34 km) to Taos. New Mexico State Road 434 connects the center of Angel Fire with US 64 to the north and leads south 34 miles (55 km) from the village center to Mora.

According to the United States Census Bureau, the village of Angel Fire has a total area of 29.0 square miles (75.0 km^{2}), of which 28.9 square miles (74.9 km^{2}) is land and 0.04 square miles (0.1 km^{2}), or 0.14%, is water.

== Demographics ==
Historical population
| Census | Pop. | Note | %± |
|---|---|---|---|
| 1990 | 93 | | — |
| 2000 | 1,048 | | 1,026.9% |
| 2010 | 1,216 | | 16.0% |
| 2020 | 1,192 | | −2.0% |
U.S. Decennial Census

As of the census of 2000, there were 1,048 people, 462 households, and 340 families residing in the village. The population density was 36.3 inhabitants per square mile (14.0/km^{2}). There were 1,791 housing units at an average density of 61.9 per square mile (23.9/km^{2}). The racial makeup of the village was 90.46% White, 0.19% African American, 1.05% Native American, 0.95% Asian, 4.48% from other races, and 2.86% from two or more races. Hispanic or Latino of any race were 12.12% of the population.

There were 462 households, out of which 24.2% had children under the age of 18 living with them, 64.9% were married couples living together, 5.6% had a female householder with no husband present, and 26.2% were non-families. 20.6% of all households were made up of individuals, and 5.2% had someone living alone who was 65 years of age or older. The average household size was 2.27 and the average family size was 2.56.

In the village, the population was spread out, with 19.9% under the age of 18, 3.3% from 18 to 24, 22.7% from 25 to 44, 38.1% from 45 to 64, and 15.9% who were 65 years of age or older. The median age was 47 years. For every 100 females, there were 104.7 males. For every 100 females age 18 and over, there were 101.2 males.

The median income for a household in the village was $48,250, and the median income for a family was $56,125. Males had a median income of $35,417 versus $26,429 for females. The per capita income for the village was $29,614. About 6.7% of families and 11.7% of the population were below the poverty line, including 11.5% of those under age 18 and 2.3% of those age 65 or over.

== Climate ==
According to the Köppen Climate Classification system, Angel Fire has a warm-summer humid continental climate, abbreviated "Dfb" on climate maps. The hottest temperature recorded in Angel Fire was 92 °F (33.3 °C) on June 29, 1998, and July 13, 2004, while the coldest temperature recorded was −39 °F (−39.4 °C) on February 3, 2011.

Climate data for Angel Fire, New Mexico, 1991–2020 normals, extremes 1993–present
| Month | Jan | Feb | Mar | Apr | May | Jun | Jul | Aug | Sep | Oct | Nov | Dec | Year |
|---|---|---|---|---|---|---|---|---|---|---|---|---|---|
| Record high °F (°C) | 57 (14) | 60 (16) | 68 (20) | 75 (24) | 88 (31) | 92 (33) | 92 (33) | 89 (32) | 84 (29) | 77 (25) | 66 (19) | 64 (18) | 92 (33) |
| Mean maximum °F (°C) | 50.3 (10.2) | 54.2 (12.3) | 62.1 (16.7) | 67.9 (19.9) | 74.9 (23.8) | 85.4 (29.7) | 85.3 (29.6) | 82.6 (28.1) | 78.9 (26.1) | 71.2 (21.8) | 61.5 (16.4) | 52.3 (11.3) | 87.2 (30.7) |
| Mean daily maximum °F (°C) | 37.5 (3.1) | 39.8 (4.3) | 47.4 (8.6) | 54.2 (12.3) | 64.0 (17.8) | 74.2 (23.4) | 76.7 (24.8) | 74.7 (23.7) | 68.8 (20.4) | 58.0 (14.4) | 46.1 (7.8) | 37.6 (3.1) | 56.6 (13.6) |
| Daily mean °F (°C) | 23.3 (−4.8) | 25.7 (−3.5) | 33.6 (0.9) | 39.9 (4.4) | 48.0 (8.9) | 56.2 (13.4) | 60.2 (15.7) | 58.4 (14.7) | 52.5 (11.4) | 42.3 (5.7) | 31.9 (−0.1) | 24.5 (−4.2) | 41.4 (5.2) |
| Mean daily minimum °F (°C) | 9.0 (−12.8) | 11.6 (−11.3) | 19.9 (−6.7) | 25.7 (−3.5) | 31.9 (−0.1) | 38.1 (3.4) | 43.7 (6.5) | 42.1 (5.6) | 36.1 (2.3) | 26.6 (−3.0) | 17.6 (−8.0) | 11.4 (−11.4) | 26.1 (−3.2) |
| Mean minimum °F (°C) | −16.9 (−27.2) | −11.3 (−24.1) | −3.9 (−19.9) | 10.6 (−11.9) | 19.5 (−6.9) | 26.7 (−2.9) | 35.1 (1.7) | 33.6 (0.9) | 23.3 (−4.8) | 10.3 (−12.1) | −4.6 (−20.3) | −13.7 (−25.4) | −23.9 (−31.1) |
| Record low °F (°C) | −30 (−34) | −39 (−39) | −20 (−29) | 0 (−18) | 10 (−12) | 19 (−7) | 29 (−2) | 25 (−4) | 19 (−7) | −6 (−21) | −22 (−30) | −27 (−33) | −39 (−39) |
| Average precipitation inches (mm) | 1.46 (37) | 1.54 (39) | 1.79 (45) | 1.41 (36) | 1.77 (45) | 1.20 (30) | 2.78 (71) | 2.73 (69) | 1.98 (50) | 1.62 (41) | 1.08 (27) | 1.53 (39) | 20.89 (529) |
| Average snowfall inches (cm) | 24.3 (62) | 21.4 (54) | 22.0 (56) | 15.4 (39) | 3.5 (8.9) | 0.1 (0.25) | 0.0 (0.0) | 0.0 (0.0) | 0.3 (0.76) | 6.4 (16) | 8.8 (22) | 21.8 (55) | 124.0 (315) |
| Average precipitation days (≥ 0.01 in) | 6.1 | 6.9 | 6.4 | 6.4 | 6.5 | 6.7 | 11.9 | 11.7 | 8.4 | 5.7 | 3.9 | 5.7 | 86.3 |
| Average snowy days (≥ 0.1 in) | 6.1 | 6.5 | 6.1 | 4.9 | 0.8 | 0.0 | 0.0 | 0.0 | 0.2 | 1.4 | 2.8 | 5.4 | 34.2 |
Source 1: NOAA
Source 2: National Weather Service (mean maxima/minima 2006–2020)

== Education ==
The school district is Cimarron Municipal Schools.

== Transportation ==
Angel Fire is served by the Angel Fire Airport (AXX). Its runways, numbered 17 and 35, have paved lengths of 8,900 by 100 feet (2,713 by 30 m) and are jet capable. The airport is managed and maintained by Ross Aviation/Pearce Enterprises and can accommodate corporate and private aircraft. UNICOM is 122.8. By elevation, Angel Fire Airport is the fifth highest in the United States. The airport briefly saw scheduled airline service during the winter of 1986/1987 by Mesa Airlines with a single flight to Albuquerque using a 19-seat Beechcraft 1900 aircraft. Advanced Airlines service to Albuquerque is in effect as of December 2024.

== Events ==
Every summer, the Village of Angel Fire hosts Music from Angel Fire, which has been presenting chamber music concerts to local communities since 1984. Angel Fire venues include the United Church of Angel Fire, Angel Fire Baptist Church and Angel Fire Community Center.

Every summer, the Village of Angel Fire hosts "Angel Fire Fest," which has been presenting chamber music concerts to local communities since 2021.

== See also ==
- Angel Fire Resort
