= Elizabethtown, New Mexico =

Unincorporated community in Colfax County, New Mexico, United States

- Unincorporated community
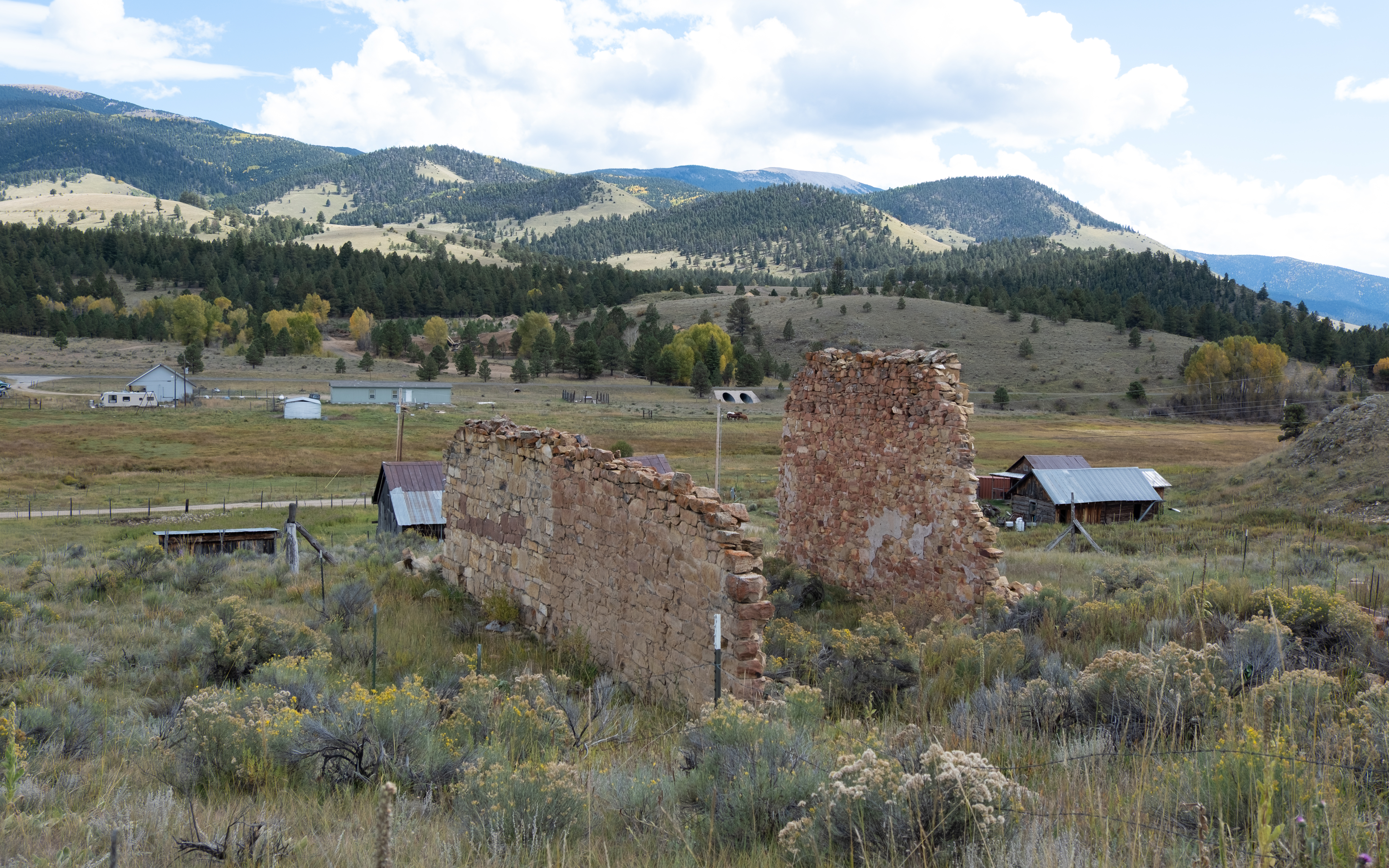

- Location within the state of New Mexico Elizabethtown (the United States)
- Coordinates: 36°37′09″N 105°17′04″W
- Country: United States
- State: New Mexico
- County: Colfax
- Elevation: 8,485 ft (2,586 m)
- Time zone: UTC-7 (Mountain (MST))
  - Summer (DST): UTC-6 (MDT)
- GNIS feature ID: 928727

Elizabethtown is an unincorporated community in Colfax County, New Mexico, United States. It is located just off New Mexico State Road 38, between the communities of Eagle Nest and Red River. Elizabethtown is situated just east of the Carson National Forest. The community is a former mining town and lies northeast of Scully Mountain and west of Baldy Mountain.

== History ==
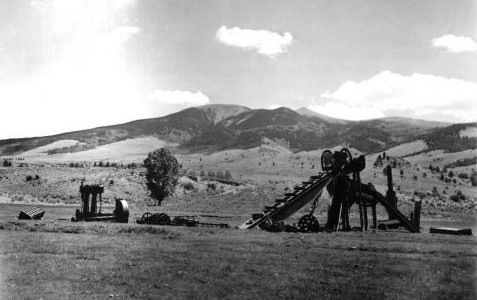
Elizabethtown, mining relics, 1939

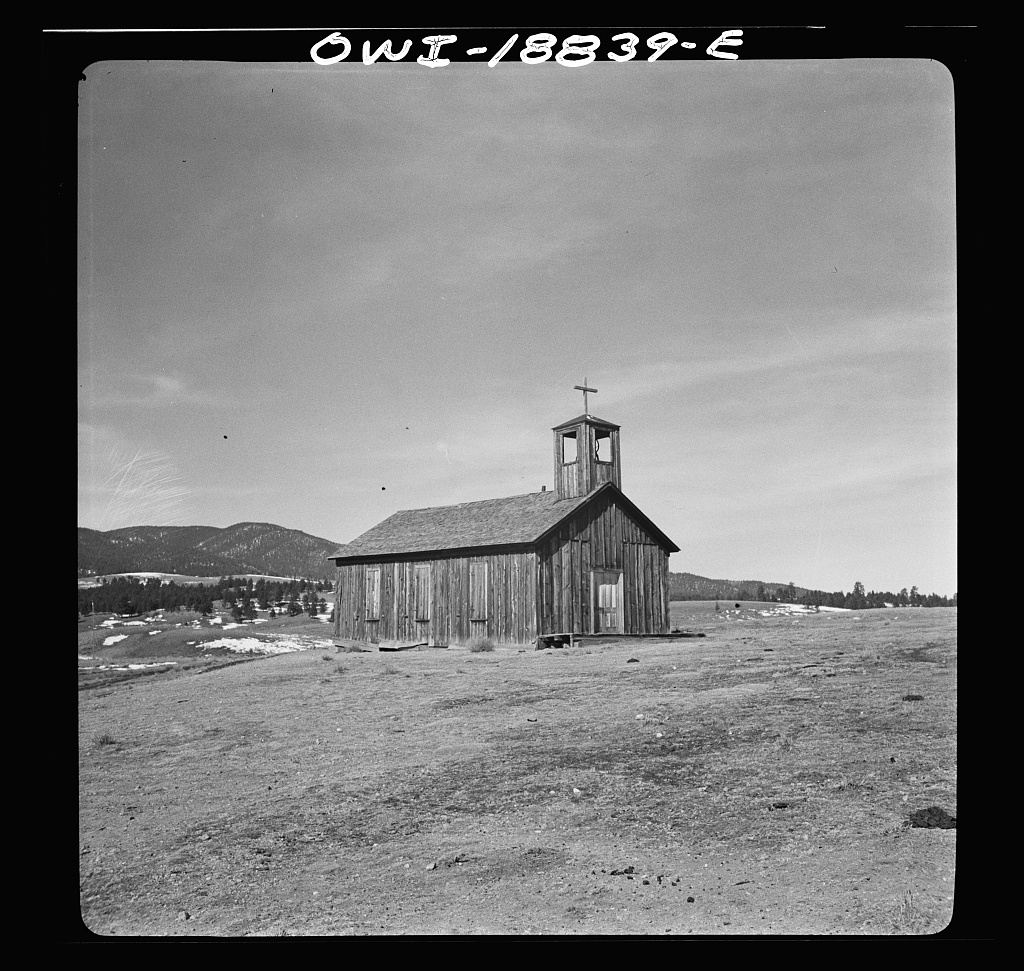
Church at Elizabethtown (1943)

Elizabethtown began in 1866 when miners began placer mining and founded hard rock mines like the Mystic Copper Mine. It was New Mexico's first incorporated town. The town was founded by the Captain William H. Moore, the commander of Fort Union, New Mexico (north of Las Vegas, New Mexico), and was named after his daughter, Elizabeth Catherine Moore. Nicknamed "E-Town," the town rapidly grew to from 1867 to 1869 during a regional gold rush. At its height of prosperity in 1869, Elizabethtown possibly had between 5,000 and 9,000 residents, making it the most populous place in New Mexico at the time, although the exact number is uncertain since no census was taken. In 1870, it was designated the first seat of the newly formed Colfax County. However, by 1872, the population had dwindled to about 100 residents as the gold rush subsided and the mines dwindled. Consequently, the county seat was moved to Cimarron.

The town was somewhat revived when the Atchison, Topeka, and Santa Fe Railroad passed nearby in the early 1890s, making mining feasible once again. The village was also part of the Colfax County War. However, a fire in 1903 destroyed the majority of the wooden town. As the mines declined, the town population dwindled, and by 1917, few called the Town home.

Today, Elizabethtown consists of a small collection of ranch homes, built atop the once bustling city. Many of these homes are informal houses built over time with available materials. The only remnant of the original town is the stone wall of boarding house. Additionally, there is a large cemetery atop the hill, containing graves belonging to various individuals, primarily Hispanic.

== Charles Kennedy ==
Serial killer Charles Kennedy lived between Elizabethtown and Taos, luring weary travelers to dine and stay with him at his cabin; he may have killed 14 or more people. Kennedy was killed by a group of angry vigilantes, led by the notorious Clay Allison.

=== Major highways ===
- New Mexico State Road 38

== See also ==
Baldy Town, New Mexico

Eagle Nest, New Mexico

List of ghost towns in New Mexico
