= New Mexico State Road 38 =

State highway in New Mexico, United States

State Road 38

Route information
- Maintained by NMDOT
- Length: 29.266 mi (47.099 km)

Major junctions
- West end: NM 522 in Questa
- East end: US 64 in Eagle Nest

Location
- Country: United States
- State: New Mexico
- Counties: Colfax, Taos

Highway system
- New Mexico State Highway System; Interstate; US; State; Scenic
← NM 37	→ NM 39

State Road 38 (NM 38) is a state highway in Taos and Colfax counties in the U.S. state of New Mexico. Its total length is approximately 29.3 miles (47.2 km). It traverses the Sangre de Cristo Mountains through portions of Carson National Forest and Moreno Valley. NM 38's western terminus is at NM 522 in Questa, and the eastern terminus is at U.S. Route 64 in Eagle Nest. The highway passes through Bobcat Pass, the highest mountain pass in the state.

== Major intersections ==
County	Location	mi	km	Destinations	Notes
Taos	Questa	0.000	0.000	NM 522	Western terminus
Taos	Red River	12.630	20.326	NM 578 south	Northern terminus of NM 578
Colfax	Eagle Nest	21.510	34.617	US 64	Eastern terminus
1.000 mi = 1.609 km; 1.000 km = 0.621 mi
