= John Dunn Bridge =

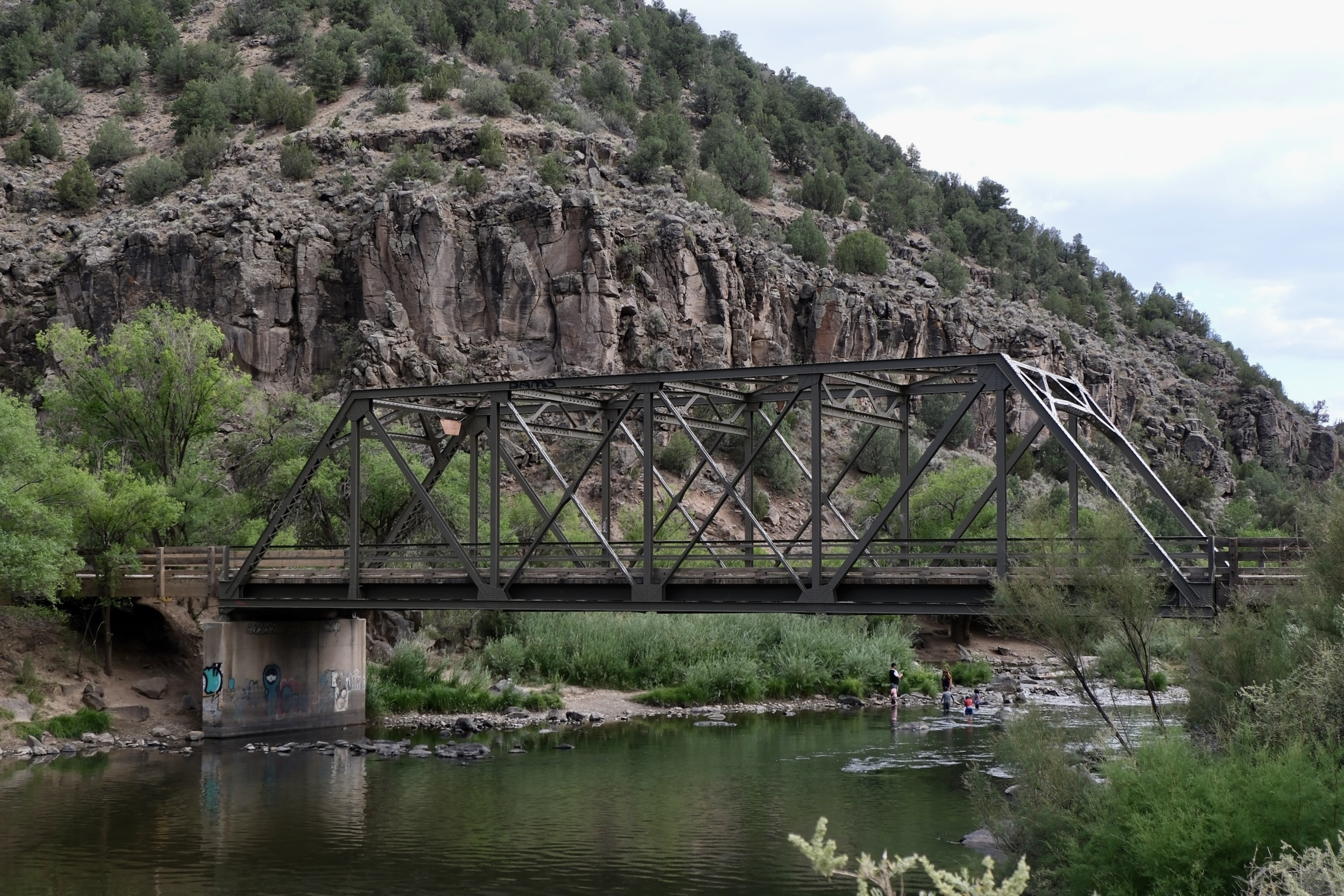
- The John Dunn Bridge in 2024
- Coordinates: 36°32′5.83″N 105°42′31.34″W
- Carries: Motor vehicles, pedestrians and bicycles
- Crosses: Rio Grande
- Locale: Arroyo Hondo, New Mexico

History
- Construction start: 1908

Location
- Interactive map of John Dunn Bridge

John Dunn Bridge is located in Arroyo Hondo in north-central New Mexico. It crosses the Rio Grande near the confluence of the Rio Hondo. It was built in 1908 by John Dunn who transported travelers and mail into Taos and housed travelers overnight at his hotel near the bridge. It was sold to the Territory of New Mexico in 1912, and at that time the toll bridge was made a free bridge to travelers. Recreational opportunities on the rivers include fishing, kayaking, and whitewater rafting. It is near the Black Rock Hot Springs.

== Geography ==
The bridge is located about 3 miles (5 km) west of Arroyo Hondo on a gravel road that parallels the Rio Hondo. The road, off NM 522, runs through Bureau of Land Management property and is known as John Dunn Bridge Road and County Road B-007.

An 18-mile (29 km) portion of the Rio Grande called the "Taos Box" is used for whitewater rafting between the John Dunn Bridge, at the northern end, and the Taos Junction Bridge.

== History ==
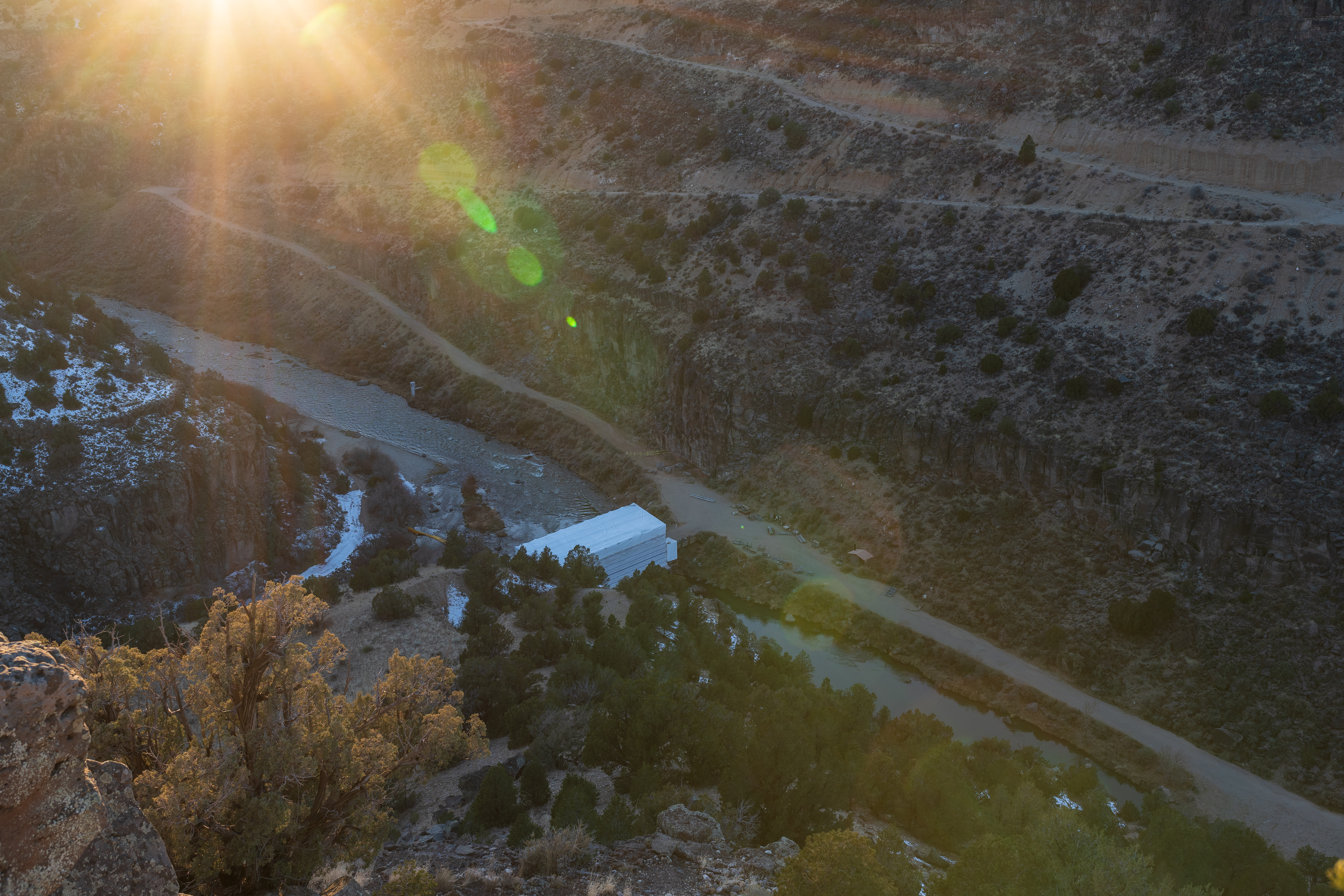
John Dunn Bridge under construction on 11 November 2022

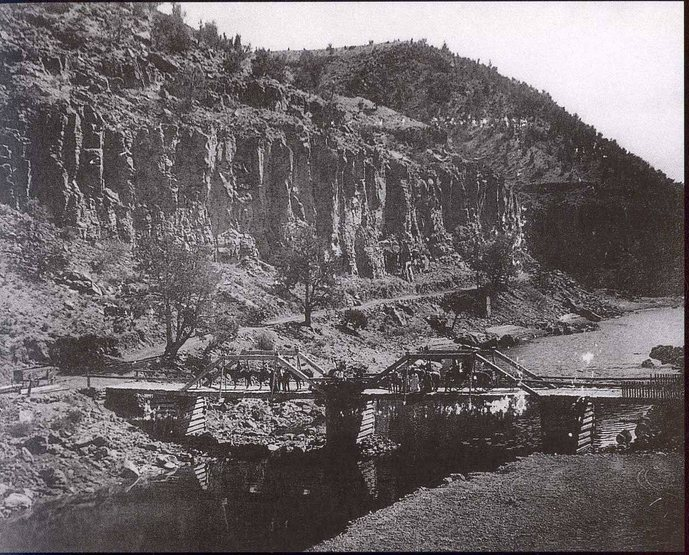
Previous John Dunn Bridge, photograph taken about 1900, prior to construction of the current John Dunn Bridge in 1908

In or after 1893 John Dunn bought a bridge that crossed the Rio Grande and established a business taking passengers and freight from the Denver and Rio Grande Railroad at Tres Piedras to Taos. The bridge burned down and he rebuilt it in 1908.

He built a hotel near the bridge there for travelers. The hotel provided fresh fish from the Rio Grande and fresh milk from his milk cow. It was a toll bridge for which he charged $1 per person and less for livestock. He provided daily mail service from the Denver and Rio Grande Railroad at Tres Piedras to Embudo, Taos Junction and Taos, that was otherwise delivered unpredictably.

He operated the bridge until 1912 when he sold it to the Territory of New Mexico who made it a free bridge.

The bridge was closed in 2007 for the winter following a rockslide in October of that year.

== Recreation ==
Fishing is available on the Rio Hondo near the bridge and on the Rio Grande. Kayaking and whitewater rafting are popular recreation activities on Rio Grande, particularly for experienced rafters. A put-in spot is located near the bridge.

Black Rock Hot Springs are located off a dirt road on the western side of the Rio Grande after crossing the bridge.
