= Vietnam Veterans Memorial (New Mexico) =

Protected area in New Mexico, United States

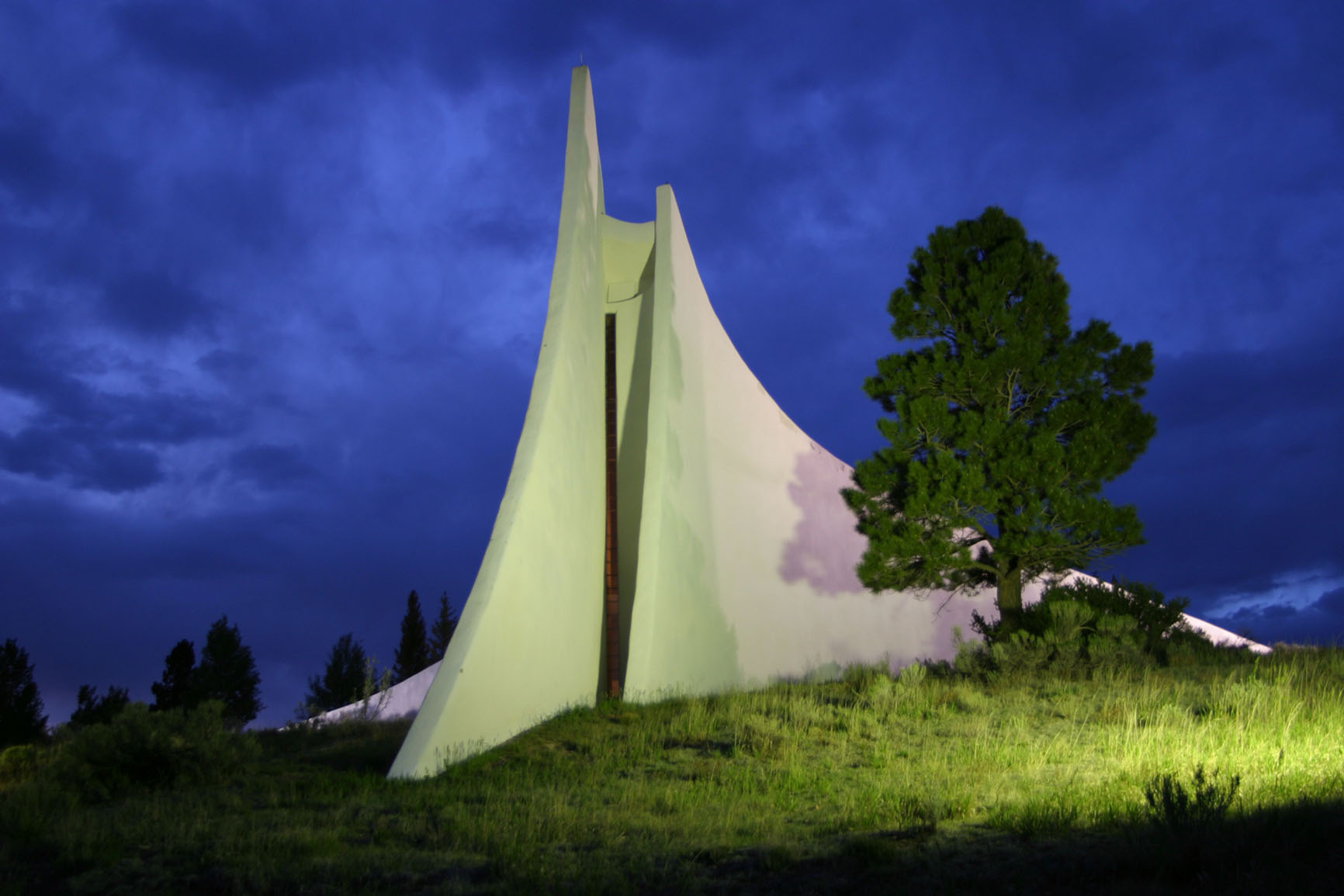
- The Peace and Brotherhood Chapel at the Vietnam Veterans Memorial

- Location within New Mexico Location within the United States
- Location: Colfax County, New Mexico, USA
- Coordinates: 36°26′27″N 105°17′40″W
- Established: 1971
- Governing body: New Mexico Department of Veterans’ Services
- Website: Official website

Vietnam Veterans Memorial is a national memorial established in honor of Vietnam War veterans, near United States Highway 64 in Angel Fire, New Mexico. Until 2017, it was a New Mexico state park, and it is now under the Department of Veteran Services.

The Chapel was dedicated May 22, 1971. "The Chapel was the first major memorial created to honor the veterans of the Vietnam War." As the "Disabled American Veterans Vietnam Veterans National Memorial", it was recognized by the United States Congress as a "memorial of national significance" in 1987.

== Gallery ==
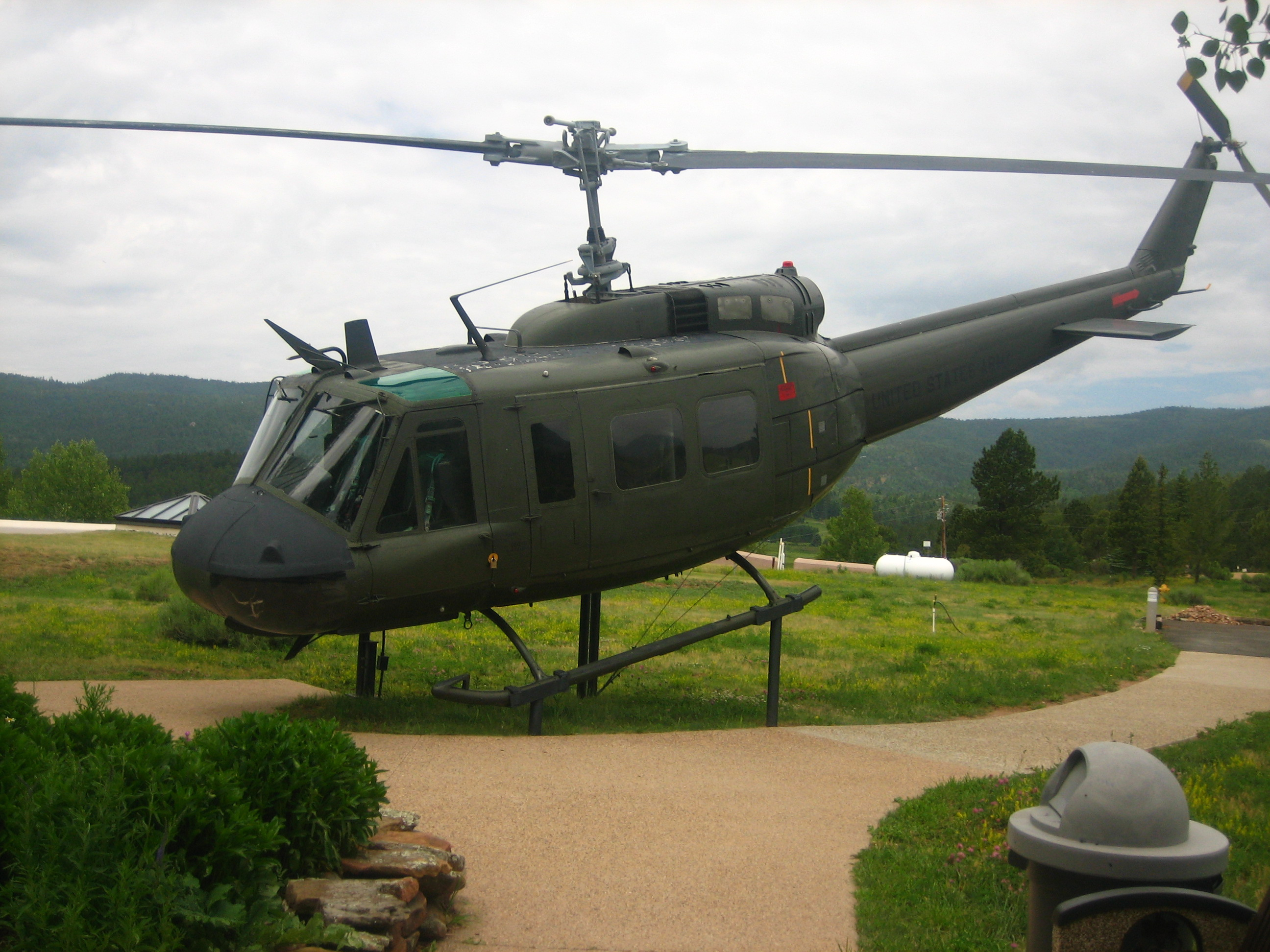
UH-1D Huey helicopter flown in Vietnam

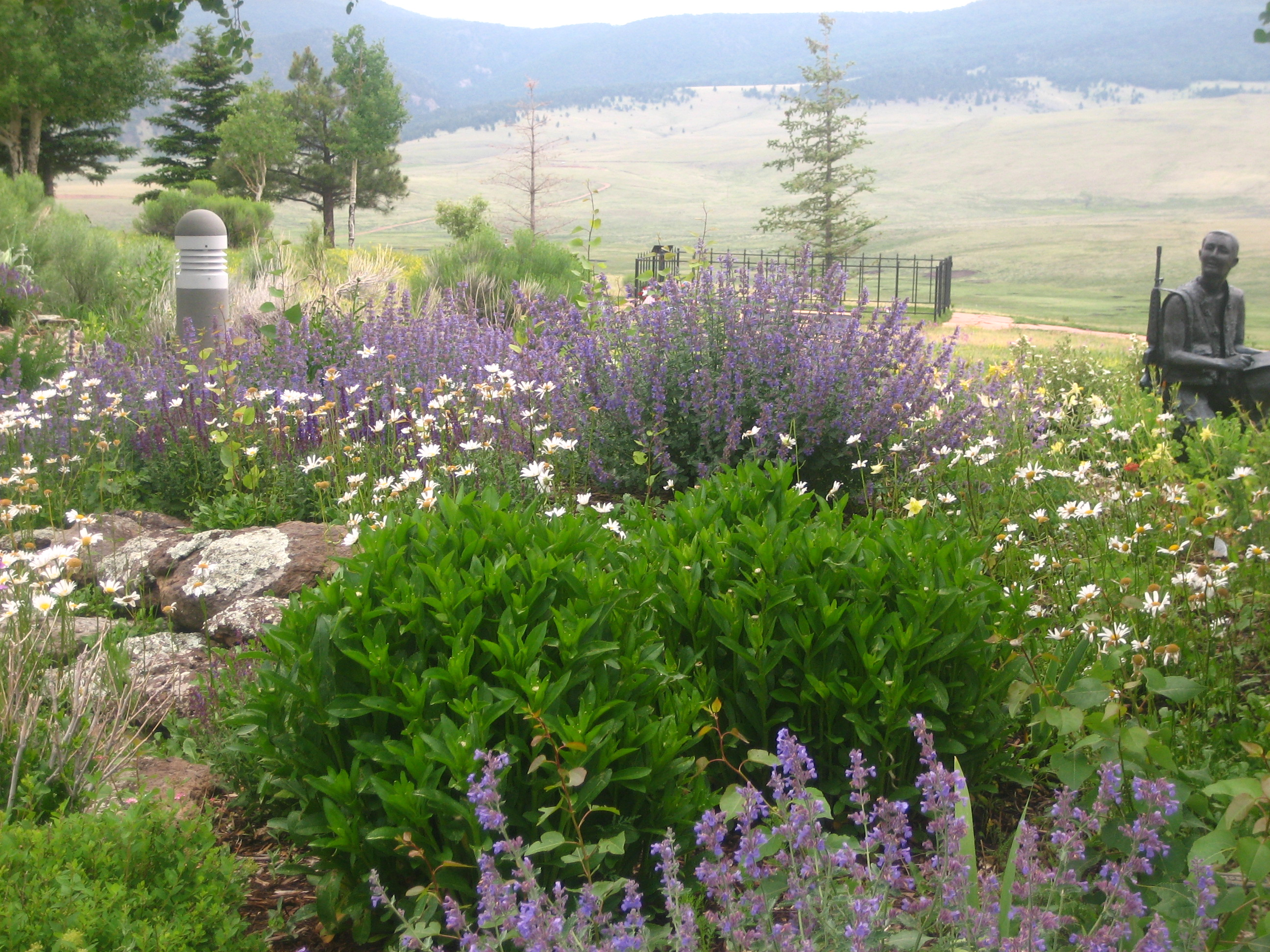
A garden in the park

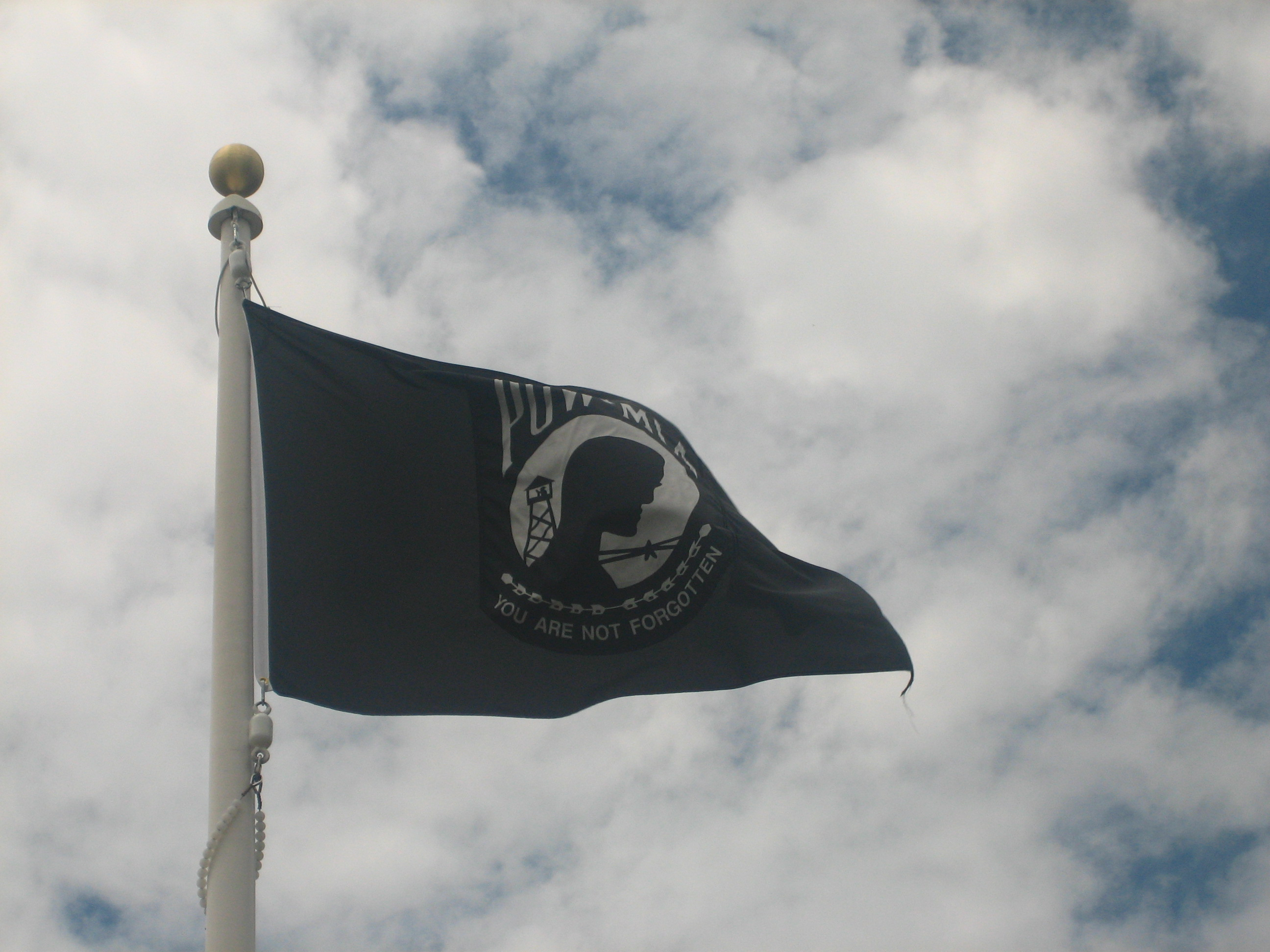
The POW-MIA flag

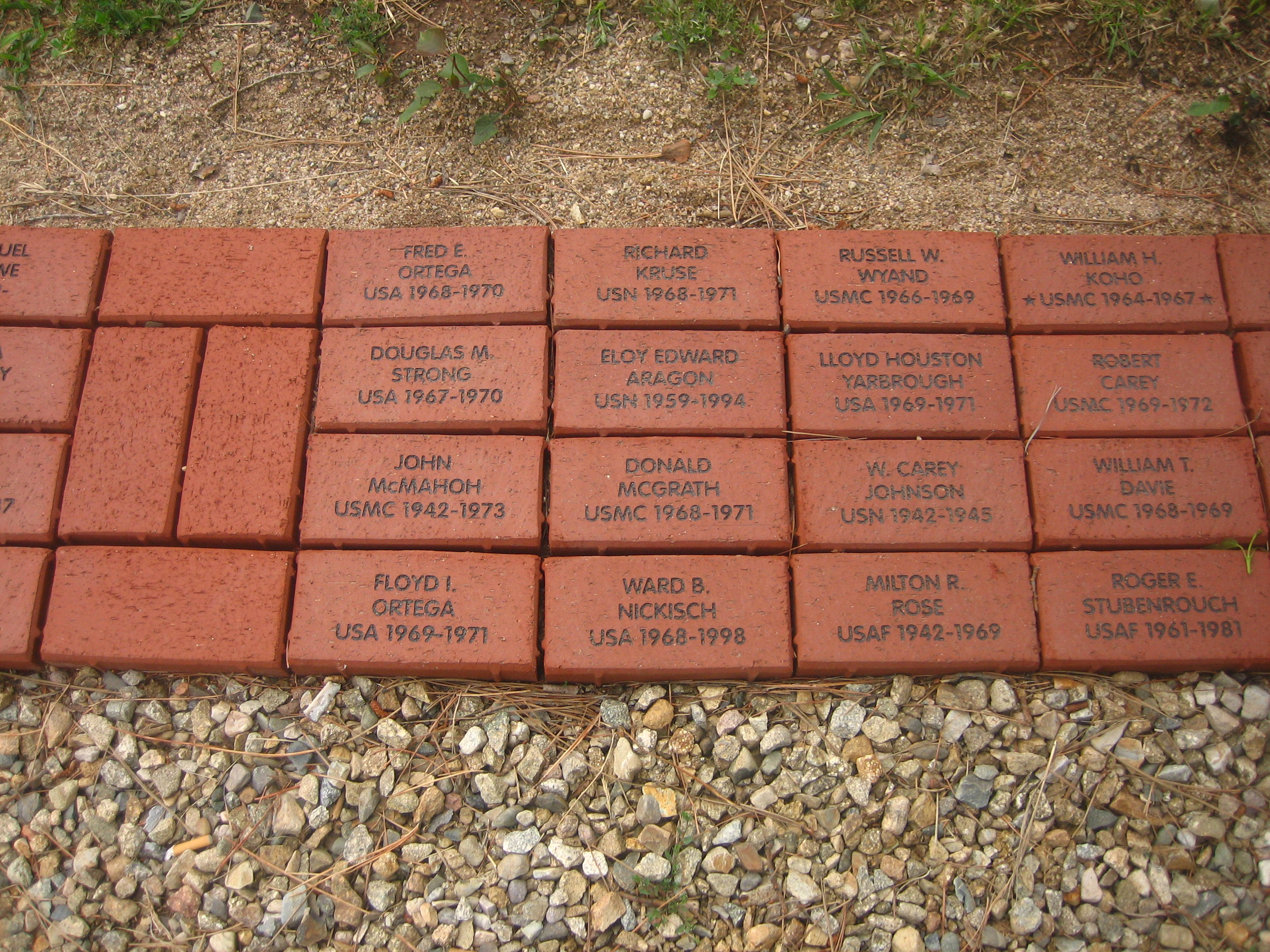
Names of soldiers inscribed on bricks

== See also ==
- List of national memorials of the United States
