= Questa Independent Schools =

School district in New Mexico, United States

Questa Independent School District, also known as Questa Independent Schools, is a school district headquartered in Questa, New Mexico. It has two district-operated schools: Alta Vista Elementary & Intermediate School and Questa Junior/Senior High School. There is an affiliated charter school, Roots & Wings Charter School, in Lama.

Located in Taos County, the district includes Questa, Amalia, Costilla, and Red River.

== History ==
In 1983, 12 children in Red River, including two in high school, attended the schools they were zoned to in Questa, while the remaining 68 children attended other schools. Some parents speaking to The Taos News felt that the Questa schools were not academically strong. John Hanron of The Taos News stated that the fact that many Red River parents did not use Questa schools made it less likely that the Questa district would build a school in Red River.

From 2012 to 2019, the acting secretary of the New Mexico Public Education Department suspended the Questa school board. However Geoffrey Plant of the Taos News stated that the board acted swiftly to address complaints about IT issues regarding virtual education.
