= Red River, New Mexico =

- Town
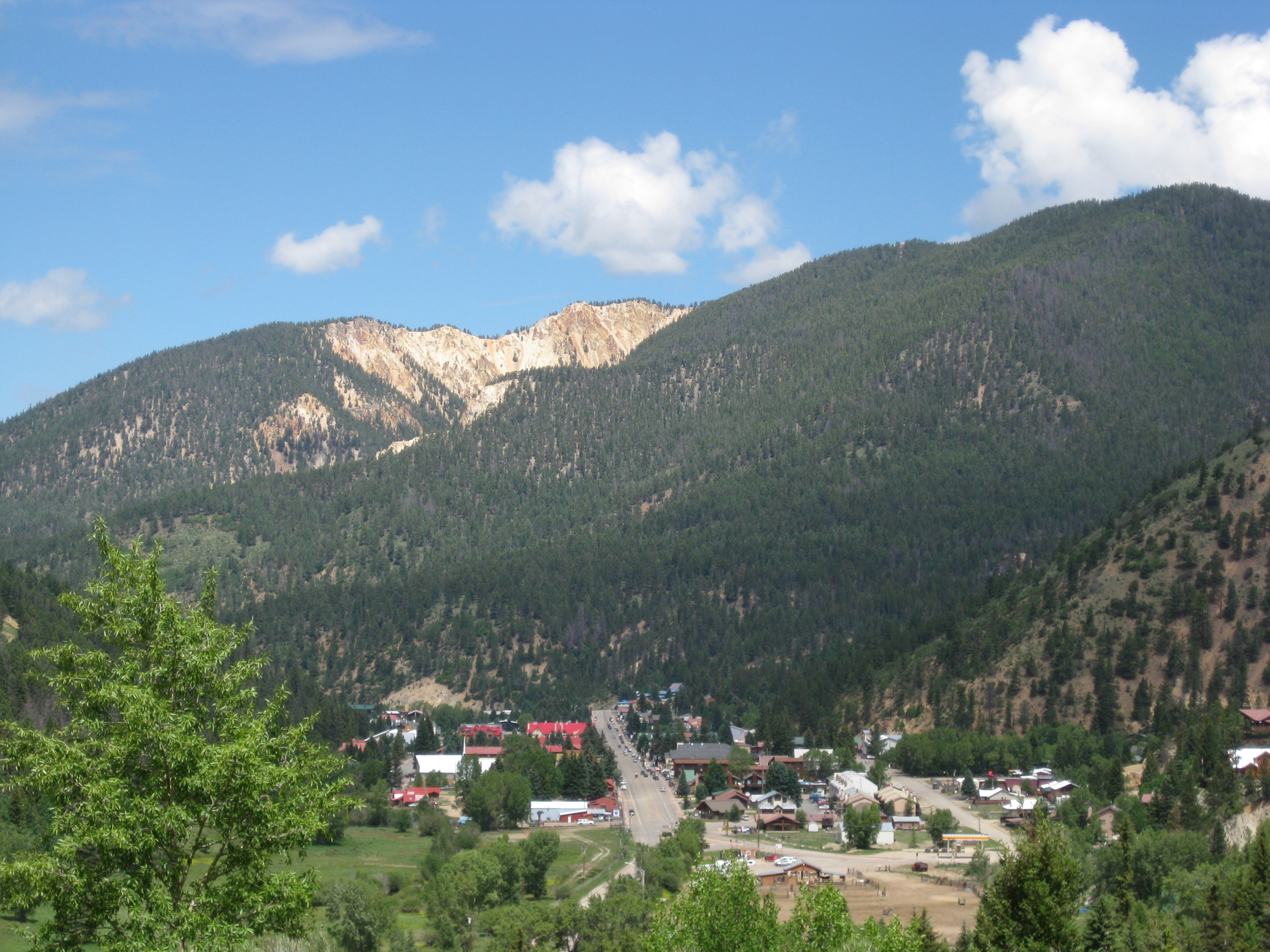
- The town of Red River, New Mexico

- Location of Red River, New Mexico

- Location in the United States
- Coordinates: 36°42′14″N 105°23′51″W
- Country: United States
- State: New Mexico
- County: Taos
- Date Established: 1895

Government
  - Mayor: "Linda Calhoun".

Area
  - Total: 1.02 sq mi (2.64 km^{2})
  - Land: 1.02 sq mi (2.63 km^{2})
  - Water: 0.0039 sq mi (0.01 km^{2})
- Elevation: 8,688 ft (2,648 m)

Population (2020)
  - Total: 542
  - Density: 533.9/sq mi (206.13/km^{2})
- Time zone: UTC-7 (Mountain (MST))
  - Summer (DST): UTC-6 (MDT)
- ZIP code: 87558
- Area code: 575
- FIPS code: 35-62200
- GNIS feature ID: 2412537
- Website: www.redriver.org

Red River is a resort town in Taos County, New Mexico, US in the Sangre de Cristo Mountains. The population was 542 at the 2020 census. Red River is on the Enchanted Circle Scenic Byway, and is 36 miles (58 km) from Taos.

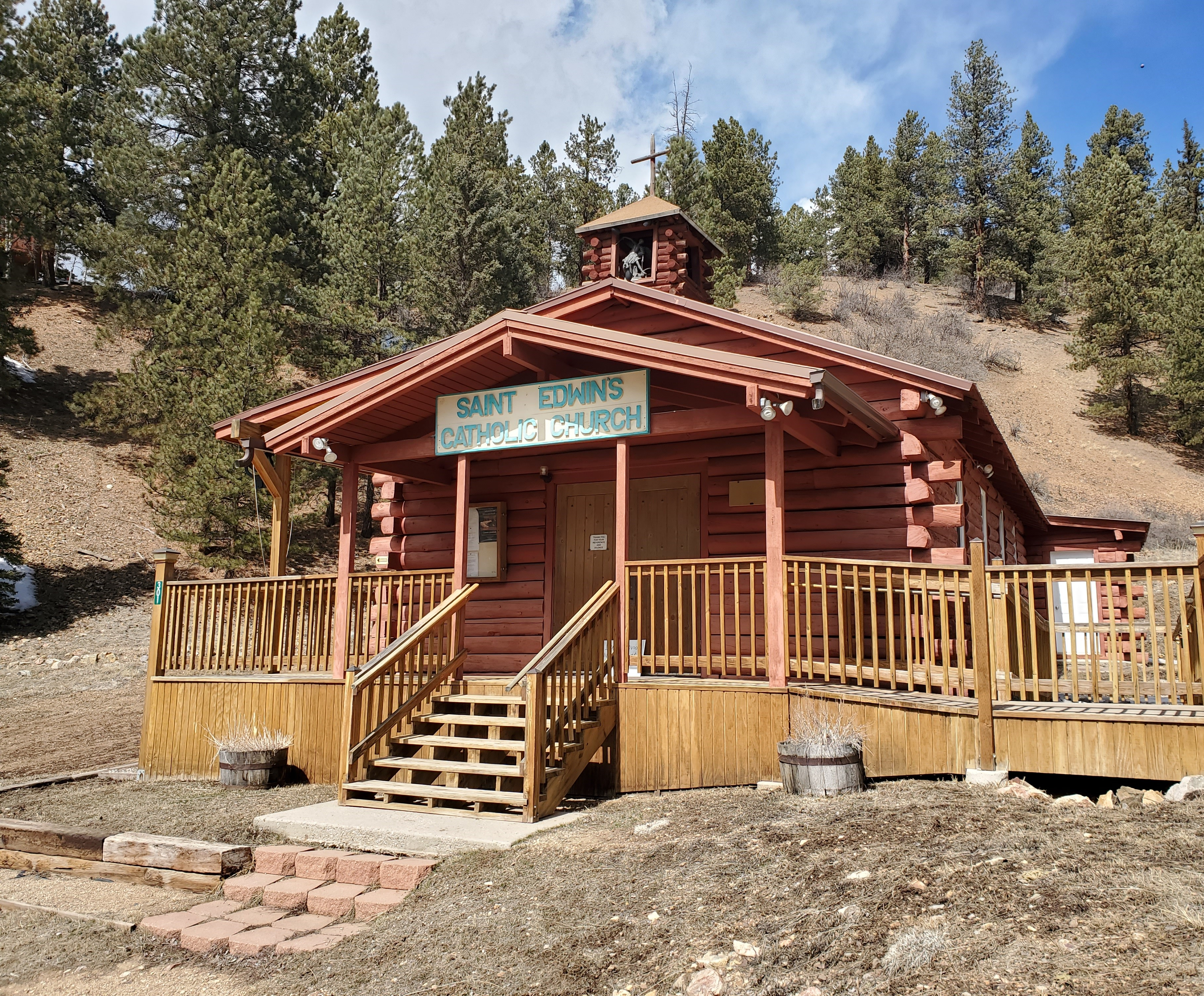
St. Edwin's Catholic Church in Red River

== History ==
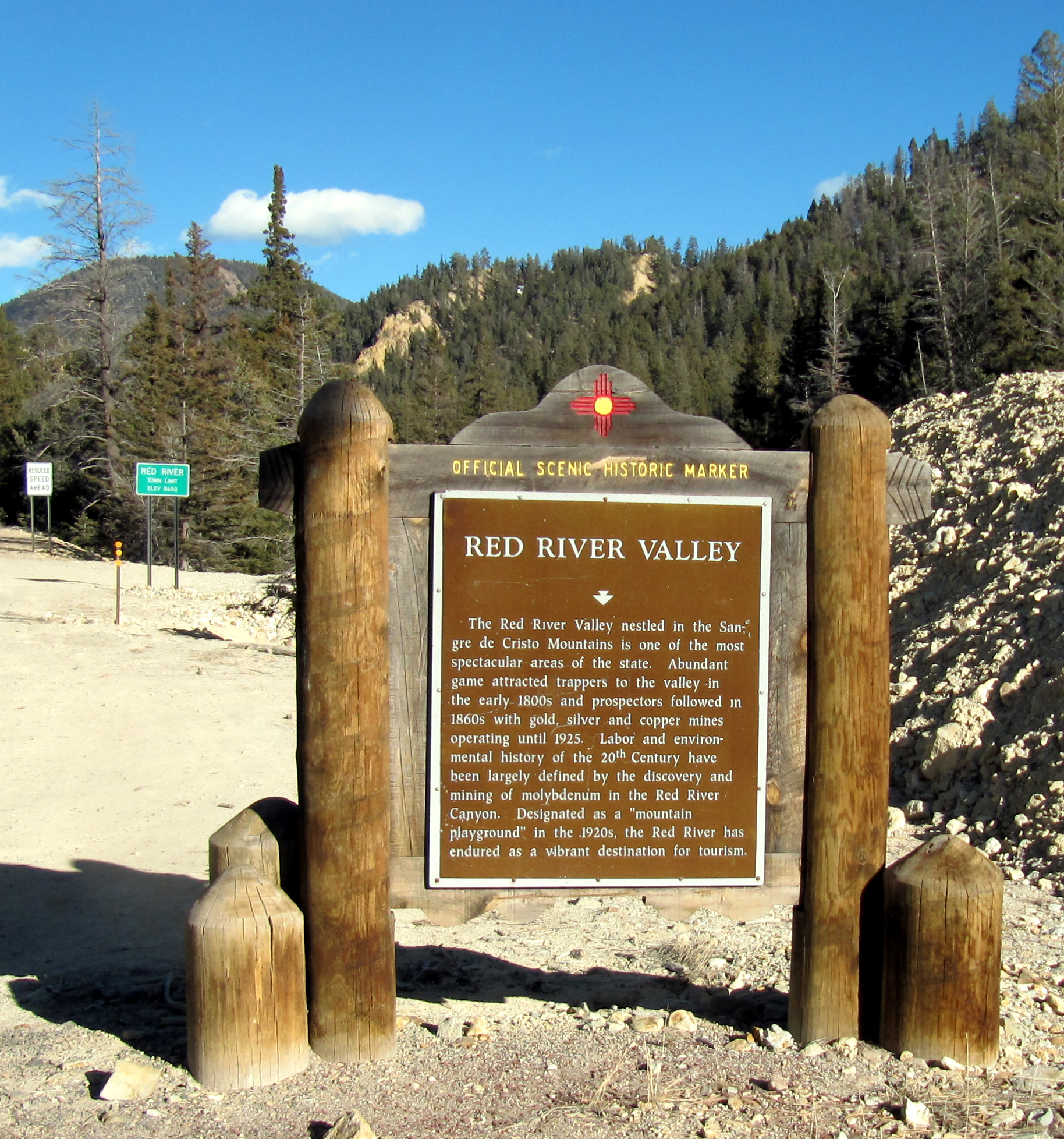

Prior to the arrival of European-Americans, the area now occupied by Red River was used as a summer hunting ground by the Jicarilla Apache and Utes, who hunted big horn sheep, mule deer, elk, Mountain cottontail, and mallards, amongst other species.

The town of Red River had its beginnings late in the 19th century, when miners from nearby Elizabethtown in the Moreno Valley were drawn in by gold strikes in the area and trappers sought game. It was named after the perennial stream, Red River, that flows through the town, coming from the northern slopes of Wheeler Peak. By 1895, Red River was a booming mining camp, with gold, silver and copper in some abundance, and a population estimated at three thousand. Mining hit its peak in 1897, and by 1905 the mining and the population dwindled but the town survived, gaining a reputation as a great getaway from hot weather and as a trout fishing paradise. The last serious mining efforts extended until 1931. By that time tourism had become the principal economic livelihood.

In 2019, the Christmas tree displayed at the United States Capitol in Washington, D.C. was harvested in Red River.

== Geography ==
Red River Ski Area with the town of Red River in the background

Red River is located in the Sangre de Cristo Mountains, part of the southern Rocky Mountains, and is surrounded by the Carson National Forest.

According to the United States Census Bureau, the town has a total area of 1.0 square mile (2.6 km^{2}), all land.

The Enchanted Circle Scenic Byway, also known as New Mexico Route 38, passes through Red River.

== Demographics ==
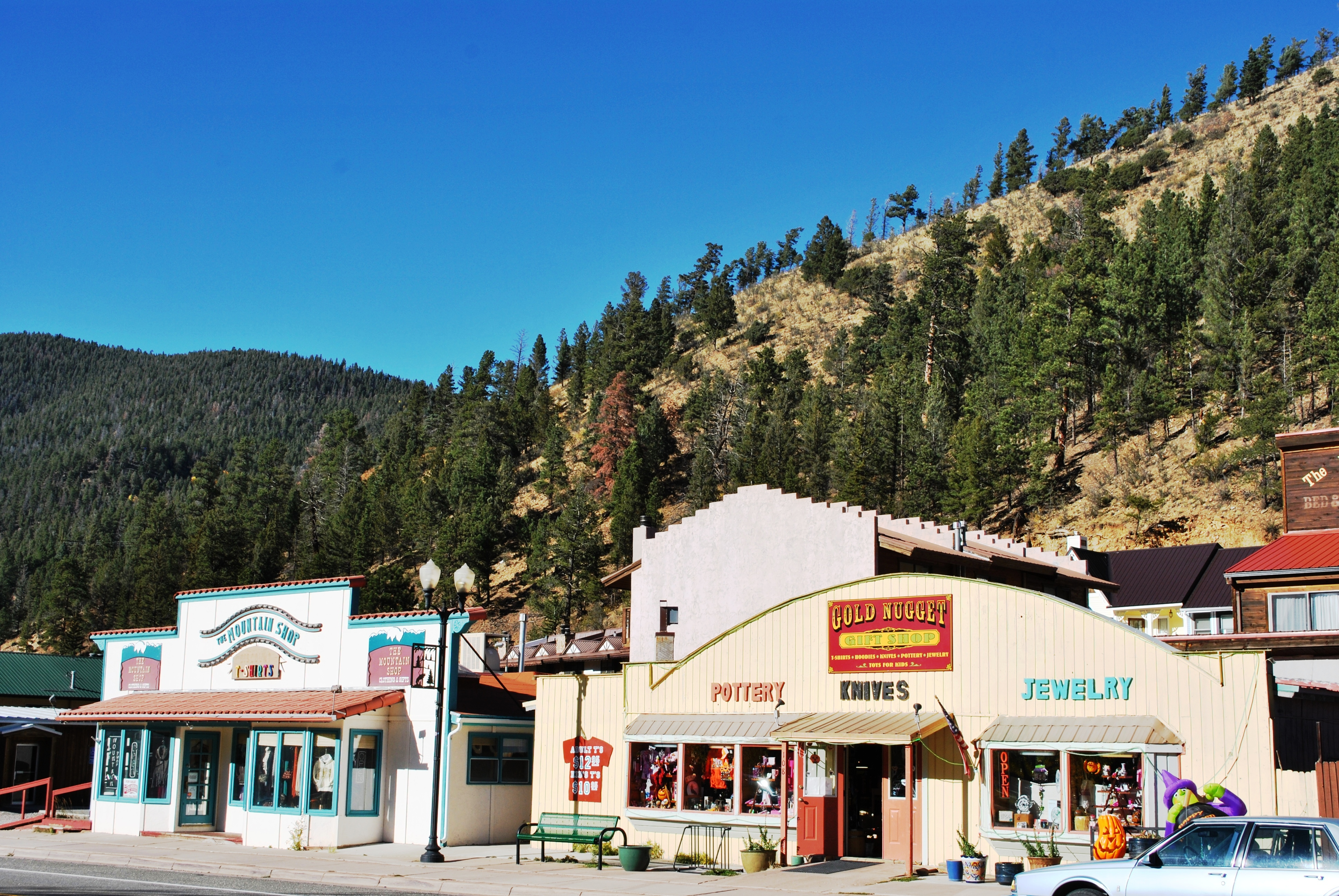
Red River Historic District

Historical population
Census	Pop.	Note	%±
1980	332		—
1990	387		16.6%
2000	484		25.1%
2010	477		−1.4%
2020	542		13.6%
U.S. Decennial Census

As of the census of 2000, there were 484 people, 234 households, and 138 families residing in the town. The population density was 474.9 inhabitants per square mile (183.4/km^{2}). There were 880 housing units at an average density of 863.5 per square mile (333.4/km^{2}). The racial makeup of the town was 92.56% White, 1.03% Native American, 3.72% from other races, and 2.69% from two or more races. Hispanic or Latino of any race were 9.30% of the population.

There were 234 households, out of which 20.1% had children under the age of 18 living with them, 49.6% were married couples living together, 5.6% had a female householder with no husband present, and 40.6% were non-families. 32.9% of all households were made up of individuals, and 6.8% had someone living alone who was 65 years of age or older. The average household size was 2.07 and the average family size was 2.60.

In the town, the population was spread out, with 16.7% under the age of 18, 7.0% from 18 to 24, 27.1% from 25 to 44, 35.5% from 45 to 64, and 13.6% who were 65 years of age or older. The median age was 45 years. For every 100 females, there were 97.6 males. For every 100 females age 18 and over, there were 98.5 males.

The median income for a household in the town was $31,667, and the median income for a family was $39,792. Males had a median income of $31,667 versus $19,750 for females. The per capita income for the town was $17,883. About 5.4% of families and 9.7% of the population were below the poverty line, including 7.4% of those under age 18 and none of those age 65 or over.

== Climate ==
Red River has a humid continental climate (Dfb), bordering on a subarctic climate (Dfc) with four seasons. Summertime is very warm with refreshingly cool nights, and winter is cold, but not extremely cold, with massive amounts of snowfall for New Mexico, averaging 156.7 inches (398 cm) a year.

Climate data for Red River, New Mexico, 1991–2020 normals, extremes 1906–2021
Month	Jan	Feb	Mar	Apr	May	Jun	Jul	Aug	Sep	Oct	Nov	Dec	Year
Record high °F (°C)	58 (14)	64 (18)	74 (23)	76 (24)	88 (31)	94 (34)	92 (33)	94 (34)	87 (31)	79 (26)	74 (23)	66 (19)	94 (34)
Mean maximum °F (°C)	49.2 (9.6)	51.1 (10.6)	58.7 (14.8)	65.3 (18.5)	74.8 (23.8)	81.8 (27.7)	83.0 (28.3)	80.6 (27.0)	76.9 (24.9)	69.5 (20.8)	57.8 (14.3)	50.2 (10.1)	84.5 (29.2)
Mean daily maximum °F (°C)	35.2 (1.8)	37.2 (2.9)	44.8 (7.1)	52.3 (11.3)	62.0 (16.7)	72.4 (22.4)	74.6 (23.7)	72.4 (22.4)	67.7 (19.8)	56.2 (13.4)	43.7 (6.5)	35.1 (1.7)	54.5 (12.5)
Daily mean °F (°C)	21.0 (−6.1)	23.3 (−4.8)	30.5 (−0.8)	37.7 (3.2)	45.8 (7.7)	54.4 (12.4)	58.1 (14.5)	56.3 (13.5)	50.7 (10.4)	40.4 (4.7)	29.6 (−1.3)	21.6 (−5.8)	39.1 (4.0)
Mean daily minimum °F (°C)	6.8 (−14.0)	9.4 (−12.6)	16.2 (−8.8)	23.0 (−5.0)	29.6 (−1.3)	36.3 (2.4)	41.6 (5.3)	40.2 (4.6)	33.8 (1.0)	24.7 (−4.1)	15.5 (−9.2)	8.1 (−13.3)	23.8 (−4.6)
Mean minimum °F (°C)	−8.0 (−22.2)	−5.0 (−20.6)	−0.7 (−18.2)	10.3 (−12.1)	21.1 (−6.1)	29.0 (−1.7)	36.7 (2.6)	35.1 (1.7)	26.1 (−3.3)	14.0 (−10.0)	−0.6 (−18.1)	−8.0 (−22.2)	−11.4 (−24.1)
Record low °F (°C)	−40 (−40)	−35 (−37)	−23 (−31)	−14 (−26)	2 (−17)	18 (−8)	28 (−2)	26 (−3)	14 (−10)	−2 (−19)	−23 (−31)	−34 (−37)	−40 (−40)
Average precipitation inches (mm)	1.05 (27)	1.46 (37)	1.85 (47)	1.99 (51)	1.79 (45)	1.11 (28)	3.14 (80)	3.01 (76)	2.03 (52)	1.78 (45)	1.59 (40)	1.22 (31)	22.02 (559)
Average snowfall inches (cm)	19.1 (49)	26.1 (66)	31.4 (80)	26.7 (68)	6.2 (16)	0.0 (0.0)	0.0 (0.0)	0.0 (0.0)	0.0 (0.0)	9.7 (25)	19.0 (48)	18.5 (47)	156.7 (399)
Average extreme snow depth inches (cm)	14.0 (36)	15.4 (39)	17.2 (44)	7.7 (20)	3.3 (8.4)	0.0 (0.0)	0.0 (0.0)	0.0 (0.0)	0.0 (0.0)	5.3 (13)	10.3 (26)	12.0 (30)	22.6 (57)
Average precipitation days (≥ 0.01 in)	7.2	8.6	9.2	8.9	9.2	8.9	16.3	16.2	9.3	6.9	7.3	7.3	115.3
Average snowy days (≥ 0.1 in)	6.7	8.3	7.6	5.7	1.5	0.0	0.0	0.0	0.0	2.5	5.7	6.9	44.9
Source 1: NOAA
Source 2: National Weather Service

== Economy ==
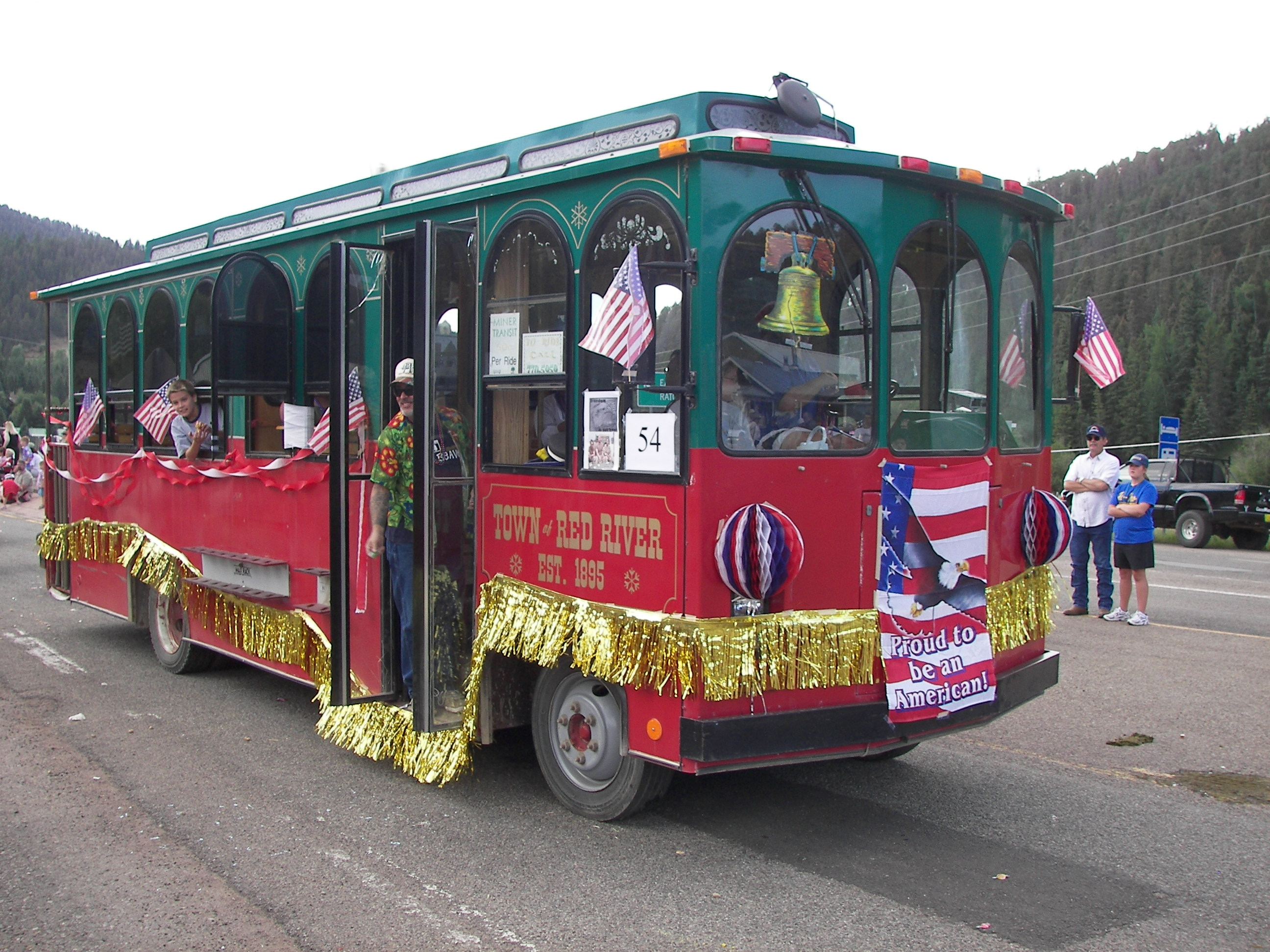
Town trolley in the annual Fourth of July parade

The main industry in Red River is tourism. Red River is located at the base of the Red River Ski Area, located 8,750 feet above sea level in the southern Rocky Mountains. Winter activities include skiing, snowboarding and snowmobiling. In summertime, visitors can hike, bike, fish, and ride horseback in the mountains. The town is serviced by a bus system which provides free access anywhere within town limits of Red River.

An annual Red River Memorial Motorcycle Rally has been held in the town for many years, attended by tens of thousands.

== Education ==
It is in the Questa Independent Schools school district. In 1983, 12 children in Red River, including two in high school, attended the schools they were zoned to in Questa, while the remaining 68 children attended other schools. 32 of the students were enrolled at Taos Christian Academy. 32 went to Cimarron Municipal Schools, with 22 going to the Eagle Nest elementary school and 10 to the Cimarron secondary school. Some parents speaking to The Taos News felt that the Questa schools were not academically strong. John Hanron of The Taos News stated that the fact that many Red River parents did not use Questa schools made it less likely that the Questa district would build a school in Red River.
