= Eagle Nest, New Mexico =

- Village
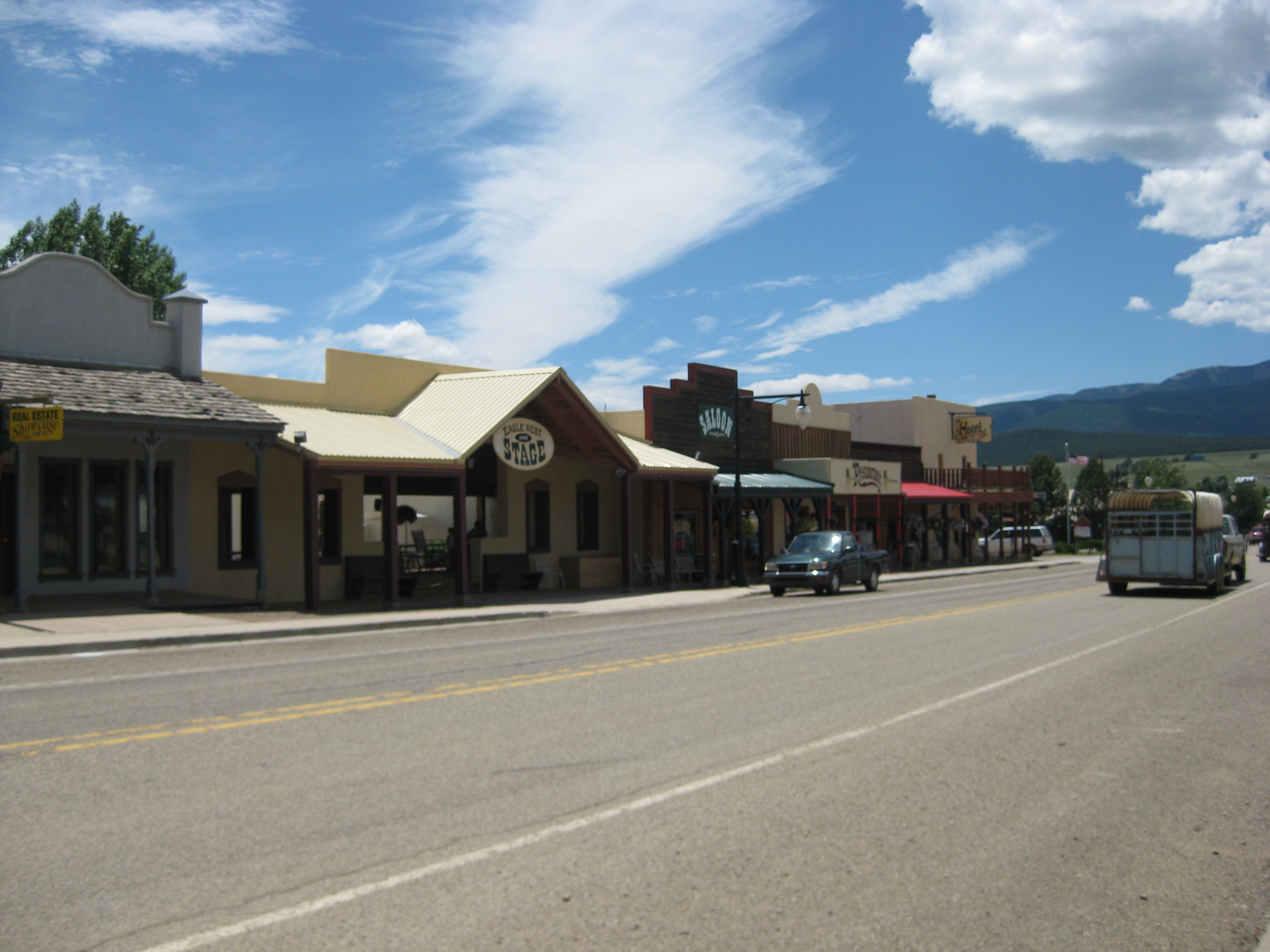

- Location of Eagle Nest, New Mexico

- Location in the United States
- Coordinates: 36°32′42″N 105°15′07″W
- Country: United States
- State: New Mexico
- County: Colfax

Area
  - Total: 5.34 sq mi (13.84 km^{2})
  - Land: 4.48 sq mi (11.61 km^{2})
  - Water: 0.86 sq mi (2.23 km^{2})
- Elevation: 8,216 ft (2,504 m)

Population (2020)
  - Total: 315
  - Density: 70.2/sq mi (27.12/km^{2})
- Time zone: UTC-7 (Mountain (MST))
  - Summer (DST): UTC-6 (MDT)
- ZIP codes: 87710, 87718
- Area code: 575
- FIPS code: 35-22020
- GNIS feature ID: 2413548
- Website: www.eaglenest.org

Eagle Nest is a village in Colfax County, New Mexico. As of the 2020 census, Eagle Nest had a population of 315. Located along the Enchanted Circle Scenic Byway, Eagle Nest is a small summer-home and resort destination. Originally named Therma, the village was renamed Eagle Nest in the 1930s. The town is located in the Sangre de Cristo Mountains (a sub-range of the Rocky Mountains) in northern New Mexico near the Colorado border.

== Geography ==
Eagle Nest is located in western Colfax County in the Moreno Valley, between the Cimarron Range to the east and the main mass of the Sangre de Cristo Mountains to the west. The village is at the north end of Eagle Nest Lake, a reservoir on the Cimarron River.

According to the United States Census Bureau, the village has a total area of 5.1 square miles (13.1 km^{2}), of which 4.2 square miles (10.9 km^{2}) is land and 0.85 square miles (2.2 km^{2}), or 16.76%, is water.

== Demographics ==
Historical population
Census	Pop.	Note	%±
1980	202		—
1990	189		−6.4%
2000	306		61.9%
2010	290		−5.2%
2020	315		8.6%
U.S. Decennial Census

As of the census of 2000, there were 306 people, 141 households, and 90 families residing in the village. The population density was 71.0 inhabitants per square mile (27.4/km^{2}). There were 333 housing units at an average density of 77.3 per square mile (29.8/km^{2}). The racial makeup of the village was 84.97% White, 0.33% African American, 3.27% Native American, 6.21% from other races, and 5.23% from two or more races. Latino were 12.75% of the population.

There were 141 households, out of which 27.7% had children under the age of 18 living with them, 50.4% were married couples living together, 8.5% had a female householder with no husband present, and 35.5% were non-families. 31.2% of all households were made up of individuals, and 3.5% had someone living alone who was 65 years of age or older. The average household size was 2.17 and the average family size was 2.65.

In the village, the population was spread out, with 22.5% under the age of 18, 6.5% from 18 to 24, 23.2% from 25 to 44, 41.2% from 45 to 64, and 6.5% who were 65 years of age or older. The median age was 44 years. For every 100 females, there were 101.3 males. For every 100 females age 18 and over, there were 102.6 males.

The median income for a household in the village was $36,477, and the median income for a family was $38,750. Males had a median income of $22,292 versus $18,333 for females. The per capita income for the village was $17,974. About 18.4% of families and 22.7% of the population were below the poverty line, including 35.5% of those under the age of eighteen and 20.8% of those 65 or over.

== Eagle Nest Lake ==
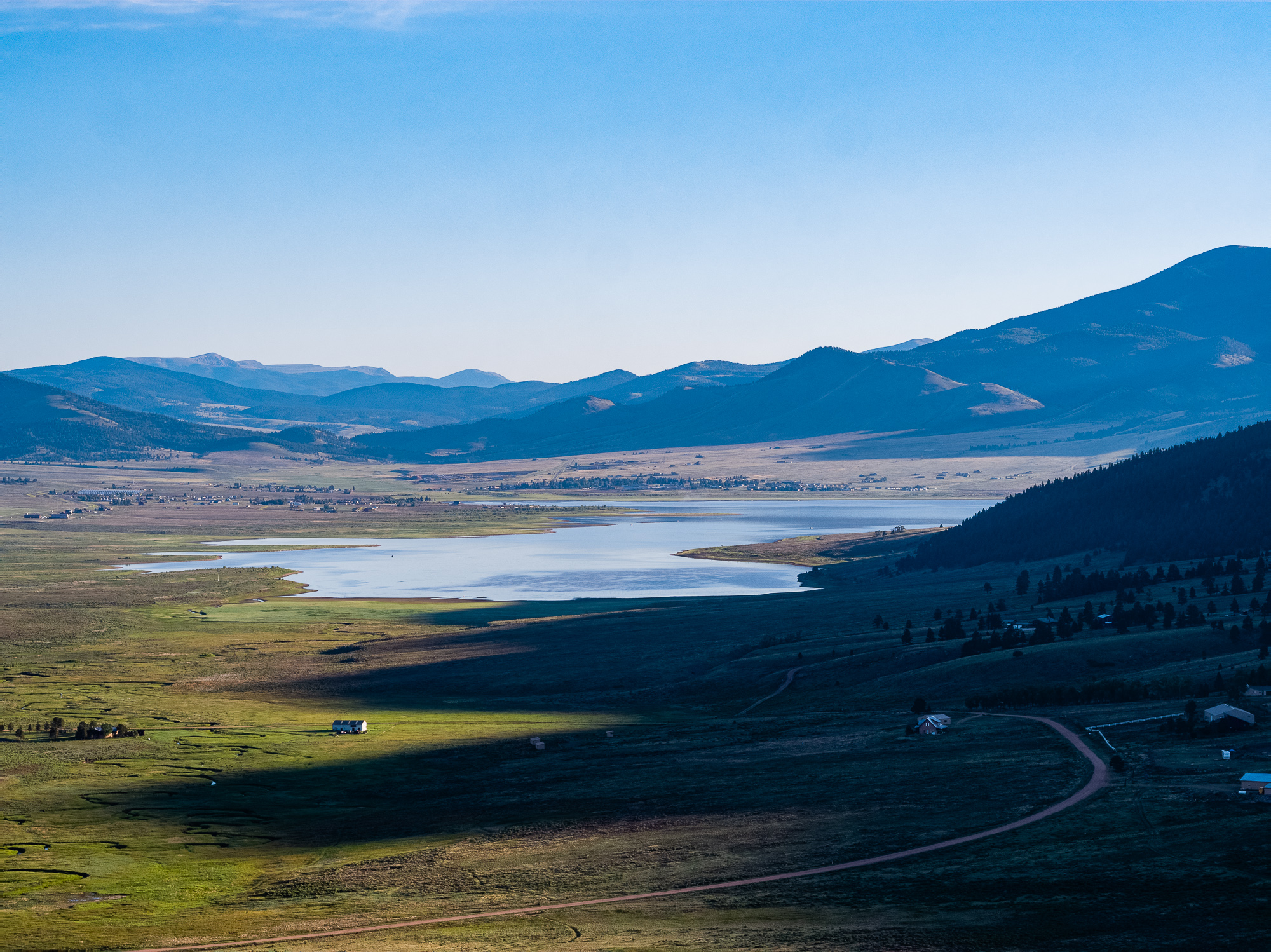

Eagle Nest Lake State Park is New Mexico's newest state park, and a popular camping, fishing and sightseeing attraction. A new visitor center was scheduled to be opened in 2010. The main game fish caught in the 2,400-acre (10 km^{2}) lake are kokanee salmon and rainbow trout.

== Climate ==
Eagle Nest has a humid continental climate (Köppen Dfb), bordering on a subalpine climate (Dfc), with very large day-night temperature variations, very warm afternoons and chilly mornings in summer, and extremely cold mornings in winter. On average, 250 mornings have minima below 32 °F (0 °C) and 40.3 mornings fall below 0 °F (−18 °C), though maxima top freezing on all but 25.5 afternoons. Eagle Nest holds numerous low temperature records for New Mexico, including the coldest temperatures ever recorded in the state during January, March, April, May, July, and November.

Snowfall is fairly heavy, averaging 62.8 in (159.5 cm) and reaching 140 in (355.6 cm) between July 1934 and June 1935, but the abundant sunshine and relatively low latitude limit cover even in mid-winter to 4 in (10.2 cm).

Climate data for Eagle Nest, New Mexico, 1991–2020 normals, extremes 1929–present
Month	Jan	Feb	Mar	Apr	May	Jun	Jul	Aug	Sep	Oct	Nov	Dec	Year
Record high °F (°C)	62 (17)	74 (23)	81 (27)	76 (24)	86 (30)	93 (34)	92 (33)	90 (32)	89 (32)	81 (27)	79 (26)	68 (20)	93 (34)
Mean maximum °F (°C)	51.6 (10.9)	54.1 (12.3)	63.0 (17.2)	69.0 (20.6)	76.8 (24.9)	85.4 (29.7)	86.6 (30.3)	84.0 (28.9)	80.9 (27.2)	73.9 (23.3)	63.1 (17.3)	54.1 (12.3)	86.6 (30.3)
Mean daily maximum °F (°C)	38.6 (3.7)	41.8 (5.4)	49.1 (9.5)	56.2 (13.4)	65.7 (18.7)	76.5 (24.7)	78.8 (26.0)	76.8 (24.9)	71.8 (22.1)	61.6 (16.4)	48.8 (9.3)	39.1 (3.9)	58.7 (14.8)
Daily mean °F (°C)	21.7 (−5.7)	25.9 (−3.4)	33.5 (0.8)	40.2 (4.6)	48.7 (9.3)	57.3 (14.1)	61.5 (16.4)	60.0 (15.6)	53.6 (12.0)	43.4 (6.3)	32.1 (0.1)	22.8 (−5.1)	41.7 (5.4)
Mean daily minimum °F (°C)	4.7 (−15.2)	10.0 (−12.2)	17.9 (−7.8)	24.2 (−4.3)	31.8 (−0.1)	38.1 (3.4)	44.3 (6.8)	43.2 (6.2)	35.4 (1.9)	25.1 (−3.8)	15.4 (−9.2)	6.4 (−14.2)	24.7 (−4.0)
Mean minimum °F (°C)	−15.9 (−26.6)	−13.3 (−25.2)	−3.6 (−19.8)	8.2 (−13.2)	19.3 (−7.1)	27.2 (−2.7)	34.7 (1.5)	34.8 (1.6)	22.9 (−5.1)	9.6 (−12.4)	−5.4 (−20.8)	−16.8 (−27.1)	−22.7 (−30.4)
Record low °F (°C)	−47 (−44)	−44 (−42)	−34 (−37)	−36 (−38)	−2 (−19)	14 (−10)	19 (−7)	24 (−4)	10 (−12)	−7 (−22)	−38 (−39)	−41 (−41)	−47 (−44)
Average precipitation inches (mm)	0.60 (15)	0.95 (24)	1.26 (32)	1.49 (38)	1.25 (32)	1.13 (29)	2.89 (73)	2.81 (71)	1.62 (41)	1.34 (34)	0.92 (23)	0.94 (24)	17.20 (437)
Average snowfall inches (cm)	9.2 (23)	13.2 (34)	13.4 (34)	7.9 (20)	2.2 (5.6)	0.1 (0.25)	0.0 (0.0)	0.0 (0.0)	0.0 (0.0)	3.6 (9.1)	8.8 (22)	13.5 (34)	71.9 (181.95)
Average precipitation days (≥ 0.01 in)	6.5	7.5	8.3	7.5	7.2	7.8	15.1	15.0	9.0	6.2	6.1	7.7	103.9
Average snowy days (≥ 0.1 in)	4.2	4.7	4.7	3.3	0.5	0.0	0.0	0.0	0.0	1.2	2.6	5.0	26.2
Source 1: NOAA
Source 2: National Weather Service

== Education ==
The school district is Cimarron Municipal Schools.
