= Indian reservation =

Land managed by Native American nations under the United States Bureau of Indian Affairs

Indian reservations
- Also known as: Domestic dependent nations
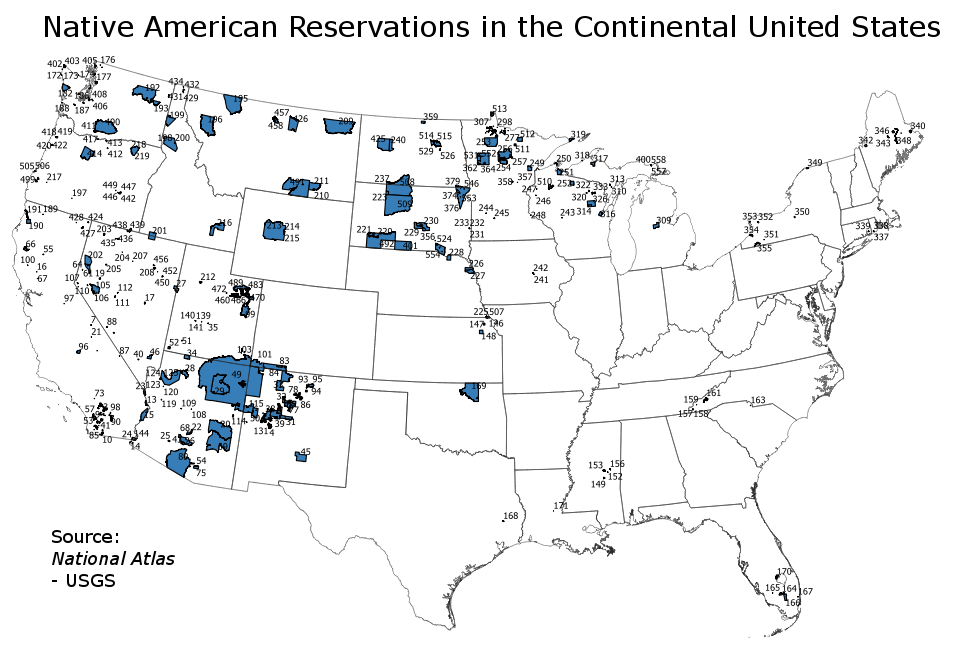
- Map of Indian reservations in continental US
- Category: Political divisions
- Location: United States
- Created: 1758 (Brotherton) – present
- Number: 326
- Populations: About 1 million (total); Largest: Navajo Nation (165,158)
- Areas: 1.32 acres (0.53 ha) (Cemetery of the Pit River Tribe in California) – 27,413 sq mi (71,000 km^{2}) (Navajo Nation Reservation located in Arizona, New Mexico, and Utah)

An Indian reservation in the United States is an area of land held and governed by a Native American tribal nation officially recognized by the U.S. federal government. The reservation's government is autonomous, but subject to regulations passed by the United States Congress and is administered by the United States Bureau of Indian Affairs. It is not subject however, to a state or local government of the U.S. state in which it is located. Some of the country's 574 federally recognized tribes govern more than one of the 326 Indian reservations in the United States, while some share reservations, and others have no reservation at all. Historical piecemeal land allocations under the Dawes Act facilitated sales to non–Native Americans, resulting in some reservations becoming severely fragmented, with pieces of tribal and privately held land being treated as separate enclaves. This intersection of private and public real estate creates significant administrative, political, and legal difficulties.

The total area of all reservations is 56,200,000 acres (22,700,000 ha; 87,800 sq mi; 227,000 km^{2}), approximately 2.3% of the total area of the United States and about the size of the state of Idaho. While most reservations are small compared to the average U.S. state, twelve Indian reservations are larger than the state of Rhode Island. The largest reservation, the Navajo Nation Reservation, is similar in size to the state of West Virginia. Reservations are unevenly distributed throughout the country, the majority being situated west of the Mississippi River and occupying lands that were first reserved by treaty (Indian Land Grants) from the public domain.

Because recognized Native American nations are subject to federal law, they possess limited tribal sovereignty. Thus, laws within tribal lands may vary from those of the surrounding and adjacent states. For example, these laws can permit casinos on reservations located within states which do not allow gambling. The tribal council generally has jurisdiction over the reservation. Legal jurisdiction on tribal lands is shared between tribes and the federal government, depending on the tribal affiliation of the parties involved and the specific crime or civil matter, and in some areas Public Law 280 is applicable. Different reservations have different systems of government, which may or may not replicate the forms of government found outside the reservation. Most Native American reservations were established by the federal government but a small number, mainly in the East, owe their origin to state recognition.

The term "reservation" is a legal designation. It comes from the conception of the Native American nations as independent sovereigns at the time the U.S. Constitution was ratified. Thus, early peace treaties (often signed under conditions of duress or fraud), in which Native American nations surrendered large portions of their land to the United States, designated parcels which the nations, as sovereigns, "reserved" to themselves, and those parcels came to be called "reservations". The term remained in use after the federal government began to forcibly relocate nations to parcels of land to which they often had no historical or cultural connection. Compared to other population centers in the U.S., reservations are disproportionately located on or near toxic sites hazardous to the health of those living or working in close proximity, including nuclear testing grounds and contaminated mines.

The majority of Native Americans (excluding Alaska Natives, who, with one exception, no longer have reservations) live outside of reservations, mainly in larger western cities such as Phoenix and Los Angeles. In 2012, there were more than 2.5 million Native Americans, with 1 million living on reservations.

== History ==
=== Colonial and early U.S. history ===
Indian (Native American) tribes and linguistic stocks in 1650.

From the beginning of the European colonization of the Americas, Europeans often removed Indigenous peoples from their homelands. The means varied, including treaties made under considerable duress, forceful ejection, violence, and in a few cases voluntary moves based on mutual agreement. The removal caused many problems such as tribes losing the means of livelihood by being restricted to a defined area, poor quality of land for agriculture, and hostility between tribes.

Early English settlers in the Americas entered into treaties with Native American tribes as a method of legitimizing their conquests in the face of competing claims by the Spanish Empire and violent resistance from the tribes themselves. Applying the term "treaty" to such unequal relationships may seem paradoxical from a modern perspective because in modern English, the word "treaty" usually connotes an agreement between two states of theoretically equal sovereignty, not an agreement between conquered people and a conqueror. However, in premodern times, it was common for European princes to routinely enter into unequal treaties with lesser dependent powers.

The first reservation was established by the Treaty of Easton with the colonial governments of New Jersey and Pennsylvania on August 29, 1758. Located in southern New Jersey, it was called Brotherton Indian Reservation and also Edgepillock or Edgepelick. The area was 3,284 acres (13.29 km^{2}). Today it is called Indian Mills in Shamong Township.

In 1764 the British government's Board of Trade proposed the "Plan for the Future Management of Indian Affairs". Although never adopted formally, the plan established the British government's expectation that land would only be bought by colonial governments, not individuals, and that land would only be purchased at public meetings. Additionally, this plan dictated that the Indians would be properly consulted when ascertaining and defining the boundaries of colonial settlement.

The private contracts that once characterized the sale of Indian land to various individuals and groups—from farmers to towns—were replaced by treaties between sovereigns. This protocol was adopted by the United States Government after the American Revolution.

On March 11, 1824, U.S. Vice President John C. Calhoun founded the Office of Indian Affairs (now the Bureau of Indian Affairs) as a division of the United States Department of War (now the United States Department of Defense), to solve the land problem with 38 treaties with American Indian tribes.

=== Letters from the presidents of the United States on Indian reservations (1825–1837) ===
Indian Treaties, and Laws and Regulations Relating to Indian Affairs (1825) was a document signed by President Andrew Jackson in which he states that "we have placed the land reserves in a better state for the benefit of society" with approval of Indigenous reservations before 1850. The letter is signed by Isaac Shelby and Jackson. It discusses several regulations regarding the Native Americans and the approval of Indigenous segregation and the reservation system.

President Martin Van Buren negotiated a treaty with the Saginaw Chippewas in 1837 to build a lighthouse. The President of the United States of America was directly involved in the creation of new treaties regarding Indian Reservations before 1850. Van Buren stated that indigenous reservations are "all their reserves of land in the state of Michigan, on the principle of said reserves being sold at the public land offices for their benefit and the actual proceeds being paid to them." The agreement dictated that the indigenous tribe sell their land to build a lighthouse.

A treaty signed by John Forsyth, the Secretary of State on behalf of Van Buren, also dictates where indigenous peoples must live in terms of the reservation system in America between the Oneida People in 1838. This treaty allows the indigenous peoples five years on a specific reserve "the west shores of Saganaw bay". The creation of reservations for indigenous people of America could be as little as a five-year approval before 1850. Article two of the treaty claims "the reserves on the river Angrais and at Rifle river, of which said Indians are to have the usufruct and occupancy for five years." Indigenous people had restraints pushed on them by the five-year allowance.

=== Early land sales in Virginia (1705–1713) ===
Scholarly author Buck Woodard used executive papers from Governor William H. Cabell in his article, "Indian Land sales and allotment in Antebellum Virginia" to discuss Indigenous reservations in America before 1705, specifically in Virginia. He claims "the colonial government again recognized the Nottoway's land rights by treaty in 1713, at the conclusion of the Tuscaro War." The indigenous peoples of America had land treaty agreements as early as 1713.

=== The beginning of the Indigenous Reservation System in America (1763–1834) ===
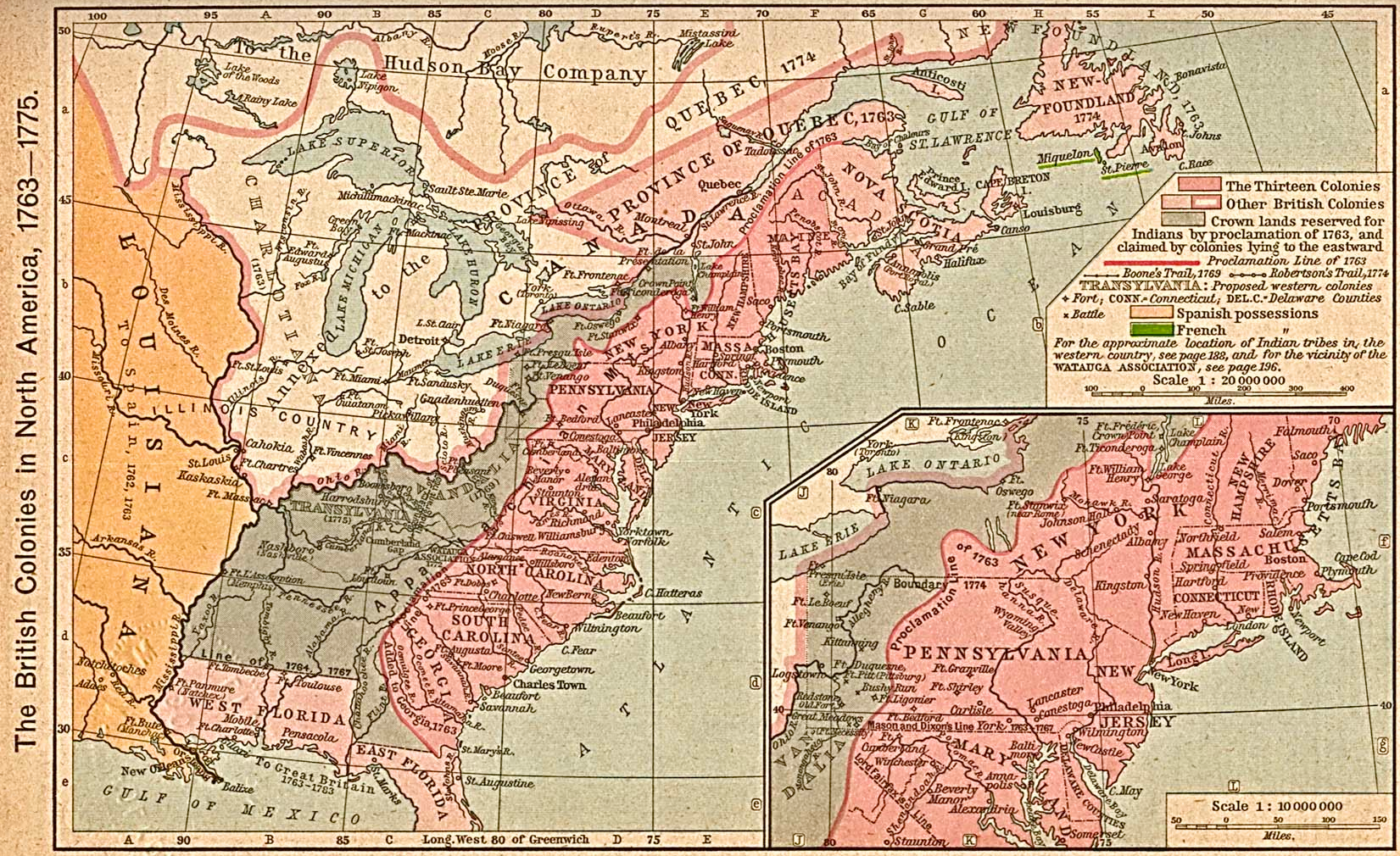
The British colonies in North America from 1763 to 1775, at the outbreak of the American Revolutionary War, including the locations of Indian Reserve (highlighted in grey) and the proposed colonies of Charlotiana, Transylvania, and Vandalia

The American Indigenous Reservation system started with "the Royal Proclamation of 1763, where Great Britain set aside an enormous resource for Indians in the territory of the present United States." The United States put forward another act when "Congress passed the Indian Removal Act in 1830". A third act pushed through was "the federal government relocated "portions of [the] 'Five Civilized Tribes' from the southeastern states in the Non-Intercourse Act of 1834." All three of these laws set into motion the Indigenous Reservation system in the United States of America, resulting in the forceful removal of Indigenous peoples into specific land Reservations.

=== Treaty between America and the Menominee Nation (1831) ===
Scholarly author James Oberly discusses "The Treaty of 1831 between the Menominee Nation and the United States" in his article, "Decision on Duck Creek: Two Green Bay Reservations and Their Boundaries, 1816–1996", showing yet another treaty regarding Indigenous Reservations before 1850. There is a conflict between the Menomee Nation and the State of Wisconsin and "the 1831 Menomee Treaty … ran the boundary between the lands of the Oneida, known in the Treaty as the "New York Indians". This Treaty from 1831 is the cause of conflicts and is disputed because the land was good hunting grounds.

=== 1834 Trade and Intercourse Act (1834) ===
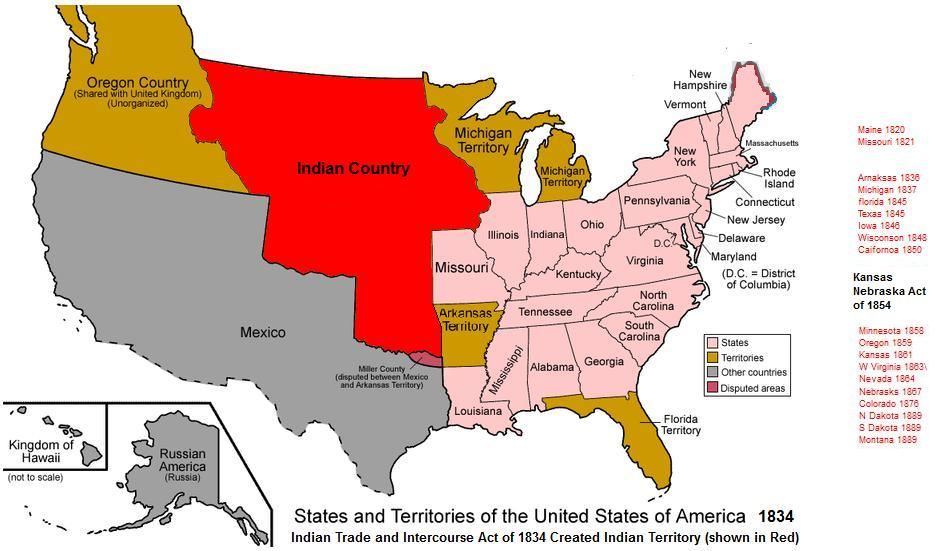
The Indian Country (highlighted in red) in 1834

The Trade and Intercourse Act of 1834 says "In the 1834 Indian Trade and Intercourse Act, the United States defined the boundaries of Indian County." Also, "For Unrau, Indigenous Country is less on Indigenous homeland and more a place where the U.S. removed Indians from east of the Mississippi River and applied unique laws." The United States of America applied laws on Indigenous Reservations depending on where they were located like the Mississippi River. This act came too, because "the federal government began to compress Indigenous lands because it needed to send troops to Texas during the Mexican-American War and protect American immigration traveling to Oregon and California." The Federal Government of America had their own needs and desires for Indigenous Land Reservations. He says, "the reconnaissance of explorers and other American officials understood that Indigenous Country possessed good land, bountiful game, and potential mineral resources." The American Government claimed Indigenous land for their own benefits with these creations of Indigenous Land Reservations .

=== Indigenous Reservation System in Texas (1845) ===
States such as Texas had their own policy when it came to Indian Reservations in America before 1850. Scholarly author George D. Harmon discusses Texas' own reservation system which "Prior to 1845, Texas had inaugurated and pursued her own Indian Policy of the U.S." Texas was one of the States before 1850 that chose to create their own reservation system as seen in Harmon's article, "The United States Indian Policy in Texas, 1845–1860." The State of "Texas had given only a few hundred acres of land in 1840, for the purpose of colonization". However, "In March 1847, … [a] special agent [was sent] to Texas to manage the Indian affairs in the State until Congress should take some definite and final action." The United States of America allowed its states to make up their own treaties such as this one in Texas for the purpose of colonization.

=== Rise of Indian removal policy (1830–1868) ===
The passage of the Indian Removal Act of 1830 marked the systematization of a U.S. federal government policy of moving Native populations away from European-populated areas, whether forcibly or voluntarily.

One example was the Five Civilized Tribes, who were removed from their historical homelands in the Southeastern United States and moved to Indian Territory, in a forced mass migration that came to be known as the Trail of Tears. Some of the lands these tribes were given to inhabit following the removals eventually became Indian reservations.

In 1851, the United States Congress passed the Indian Appropriations Act which authorized the creation of Indian reservations in Indian Territory (which became Oklahoma). Relations between white settlers and Natives had grown increasingly worse as the settlers encroached on territory and natural resources in the West.

=== Forced assimilation (1868–1887) ===
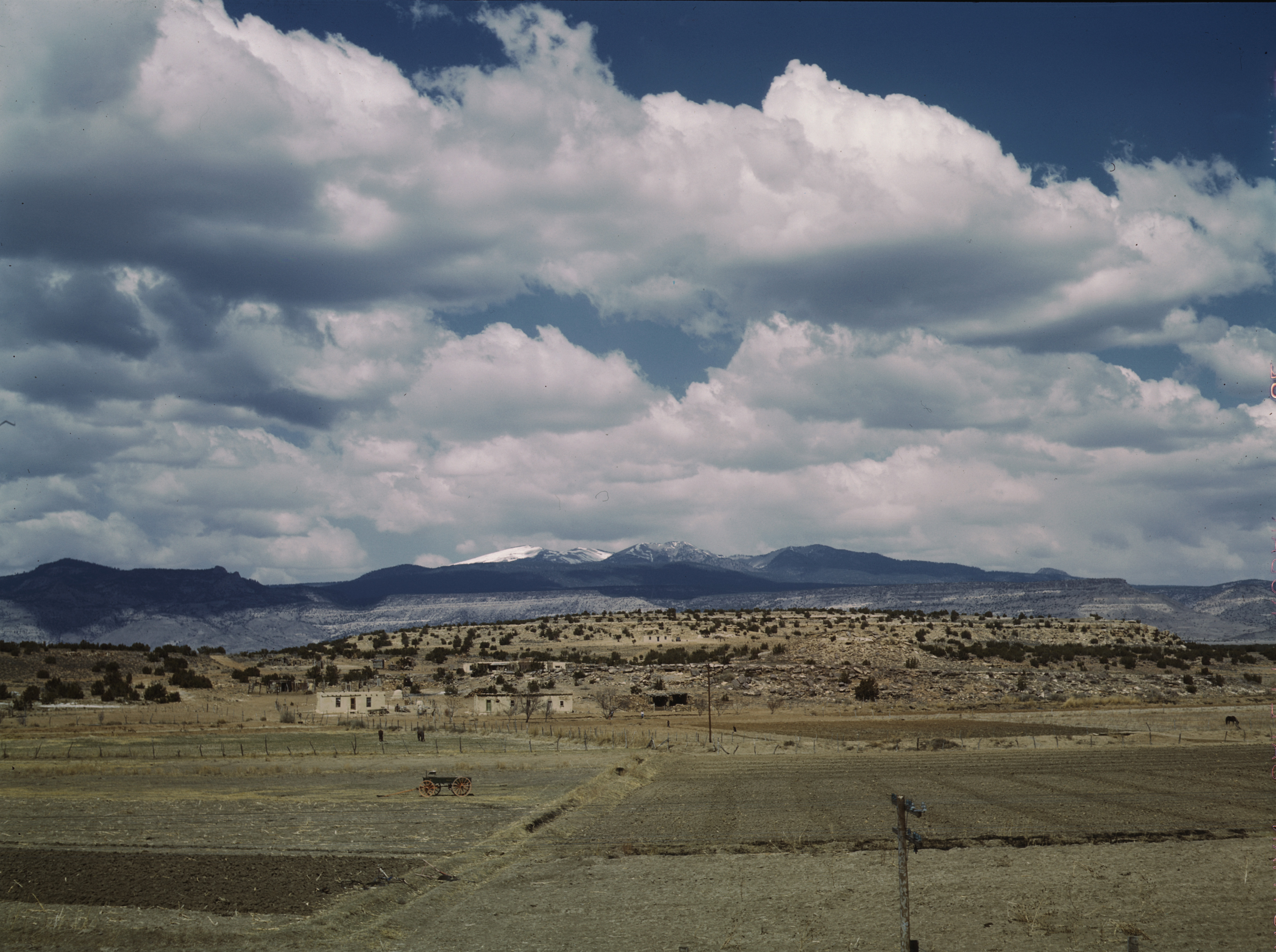
Most Indian reservations, like the Laguna Indian reservation in New Mexico (pictured here in March 1943), are in the western United States, often in regions suitable more for ranching than farming.

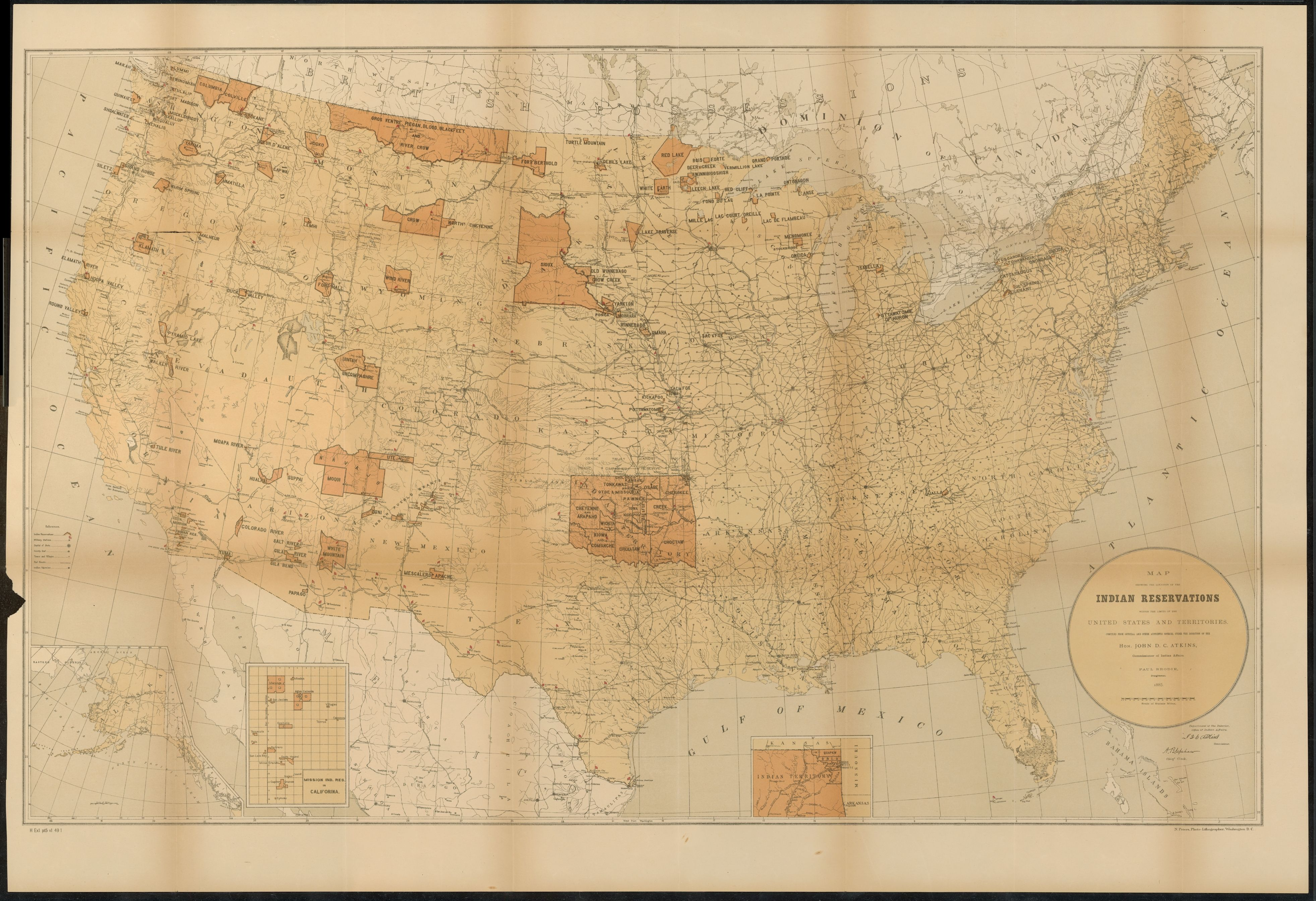
Paul Brodie's Map Showing the Location of the Indian Reservations within the Limits of the United States and Territories, 1885

In 1868, President Ulysses S. Grant pursued a "Peace Policy" as an attempt to avoid violence. The policy included a reorganization of the Indian Service, with the goal of relocating various tribes from their ancestral homes to parcels of lands established specifically for their inhabitation. The policy called for the replacement of government officials by religious men, nominated by churches, to oversee the Indian agencies on reservations in order to teach Christianity to the Native American tribes. The Quakers were especially active in this policy on reservations.

The policy was controversial from the start. Reservations were generally established by executive order. In many cases, white settlers objected to the size of land parcels, which were subsequently reduced. A report submitted to Congress in 1868 found widespread corruption among the federal Native American agencies and generally poor conditions among the relocated tribes.

Many tribes ignored the relocation orders at first and were forced onto their limited land parcels. Enforcement of the policy required the United States Army to restrict the movements of various tribes. The pursuit of tribes in order to force them back onto reservations led to a number of wars with Native Americans which included some massacres. The most well-known conflict was the Sioux War on the northern Great Plains, between 1876 and 1881, which included the Battle of Little Bighorn. Other famous wars in this regard included the Nez Perce War and the Modoc War, which marked the last conflict officially declared a war.

By the late 1870s, the policy established by President Grant was regarded as a failure, primarily because it had resulted in some of the bloodiest wars between Native Americans and the United States. By 1877, President Rutherford B. Hayes began phasing out the policy, and by 1882 all religious organizations had relinquished their authority to the federal Indian agency.

=== Individualized reservations (1887–1934) ===
In 1887, Congress undertook a significant change in reservation policy by the passage of the Dawes Act, or General Allotment (Severalty) Act. The act ended the general policy of granting land parcels to tribes as-a-whole by granting small parcels of land to individual tribe members. In some cases, for example, the Umatilla Indian Reservation, after the individual parcels were granted out of reservation land, the reservation area was reduced by giving the "excess land" to white settlers. The individual allotment policy continued until 1934 when it was terminated by the Indian Reorganization Act.

=== Indian New Deal (1934–present) ===
The Indian Reorganization Act of 1934, also known as the Howard-Wheeler Act, was sometimes called the Indian New Deal and was initiated by John Collier. It laid out new rights for Native Americans, reversed some of the earlier privatization of their common holdings, and encouraged tribal sovereignty and land management by tribes. The act slowed the assignment of tribal lands to individual members and reduced the assignment of "extra" holdings to nonmembers.

For the following 20 years, the U.S. government invested in infrastructure, health care, and education on the reservations. Likewise, over two million acres (8,000 km^{2}) of land were returned to various tribes. Within a decade of Collier's retirement the government's position began to swing in the opposite direction. The new Indian Commissioners Myers and Emmons introduced the idea of the "withdrawal program" or "termination", which sought to end the government's responsibility and involvement with Indians and to force their assimilation.

The Indians would lose their lands but were to be compensated, although many were not. Even though discontent and social rejection killed the idea before it was fully implemented, five tribes were terminated—the Coushatta, Ute, Paiute, Menominee and Klamath—and 114 groups in California lost their federal recognition as tribes. Many individuals were also relocated to cities, but one-third returned to their tribal reservations in the decades that followed.

On July 9, 2020, the Supreme Court of the United States determined in McGirt v. Oklahoma that the reservations of the Five Tribes, comprising much of Eastern Oklahoma, were never disestablished by Congress and thus are still "Indian Country" for the purposes of criminal law. However, in 2022, the Supreme Court decided the case of Oklahoma v. Castro-Huerta and held that state courts have concurrent jurisdiction with federal courts over crimes allegedly committed within Indian country against victims who are American Indians by those defendants who are not.

== Governance ==
Federally recognized Native American tribes possess limited tribal sovereignty and are able to exercise the right of self-governance, including but not limited to the ability to pass laws, regulate power and energy, create treaties, and hold tribal court hearings. Laws on tribal lands may vary from those of the surrounding area. The laws passed can, for example, permit legal casinos on reservations. The tribal council, not the local government or the United States federal government, often has jurisdiction over reservations. Different reservations have different systems of government, which may or may not replicate the forms of government found outside the reservation.

=== Land tenure and federal Indian law ===
With the establishment of reservations, tribal territories diminished to a fraction of their original areas; customary Native American practices of land tenure were sustained only for a time, and not in every instance. Instead, the federal government established regulations that subordinated tribes to the authority, first, of the military, and then of the Bureau (Office) of Indian Affairs. Under federal law, the government patented reservations to tribes, which became legal entities that at later times have operated in a corporate manner. Tribal tenure identifies jurisdiction over land-use planning and zoning, negotiating (with the close participation of the Bureau of Indian Affairs) leases for timber harvesting and mining.

Tribes generally have authority over other forms of economic development such as ranching, agriculture, tourism, and casinos. Tribes hire both members, other Indians and non-Indians in varying capacities; they may run tribal stores, gas stations, and develop museums (e.g., there is a gas station and general store at Fort Hall Indian Reservation, Idaho, and a museum at Foxwoods, on the Mashantucket Pequot Indian Reservation in Connecticut).

Tribal citizens may utilize several resources held in tribal tenures such as grazing range and some cultivable lands. They may also construct homes on tribally held lands. As such, members are tenants-in-common, which may be likened to communal tenure. Even if some of this pattern emanates from pre-reservation tribal customs, generally the tribe has the authority to modify tenant-in-common practices.

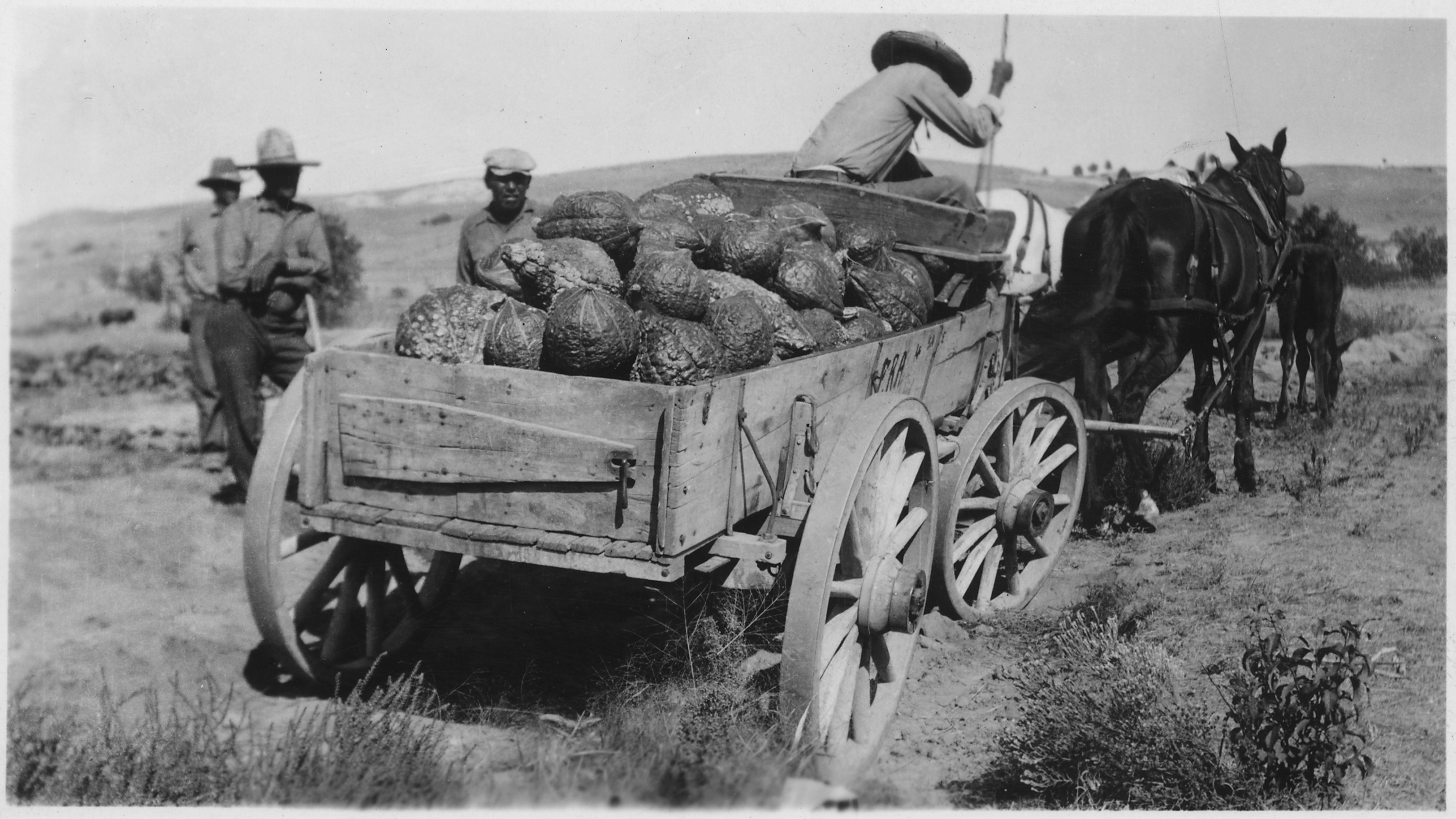
Wagon loaded with squash, Rosebud Indian Reservation, ca. 1936

With the General Allotment Act (Dawes), 1887, the government sought to individualize tribal lands by authorizing allotments held in individual tenure. Generally, the allocation process led to grouping family holdings and, in some cases, this sustained pre-reservation clan or other patterns. There had been a few allotment programs ahead of the Dawes Act. However, the vast fragmentation of reservations occurred from the enactment of this act up to 1934, when the Indian Reorganization Act was passed. However, Congress authorized some allotment programs in the ensuing years, such as on the Palm Springs/Agua Caliente Indian Reservation in California.

Allotment set in motion a number of circumstances:

- individuals could sell (alienate) the allotment – under the Dawes Act, it was not to happen until after twenty-five years.
- individual allottees who would die intestate would encumber the land under prevailing state devisement laws, leading to complex patterns of heirship. Congress has attempted to mollify the impact of heirship by granting tribes the capacity to acquire fragmented allotments owing to heirship by financial grants. Tribes may also include such parcels in long-range land use planning.
- With alienation to non-Indians, their increased presence on numerous reservations has changed the demography of Indian Country. One of many implications of this fact is that tribes can not always effectively embrace the total management of a reservation, for non-Indian owners and users of allotted lands contend that tribes have no authority over lands that fall within the tax and law-and-order jurisdiction of local government.

The demographic factor, coupled with landownership data, led, for example, to litigation between the Devils Lake Sioux and the State of North Dakota, where non-Indians owned more acreage than tribal members even though more Native Americans resided on the reservation than non-Indians. The court decision turned, in part, on the perception of Indian character, contending that the tribe did not have jurisdiction over the alienated allotments. In a number of instances—e.g., the Yakama Indian Reservation—tribes have identified open and closed areas within reservations. One finds the majority of non-Indian landownership and residence in the open areas and, contrariwise, closed areas represent exclusive tribal residence and related conditions.

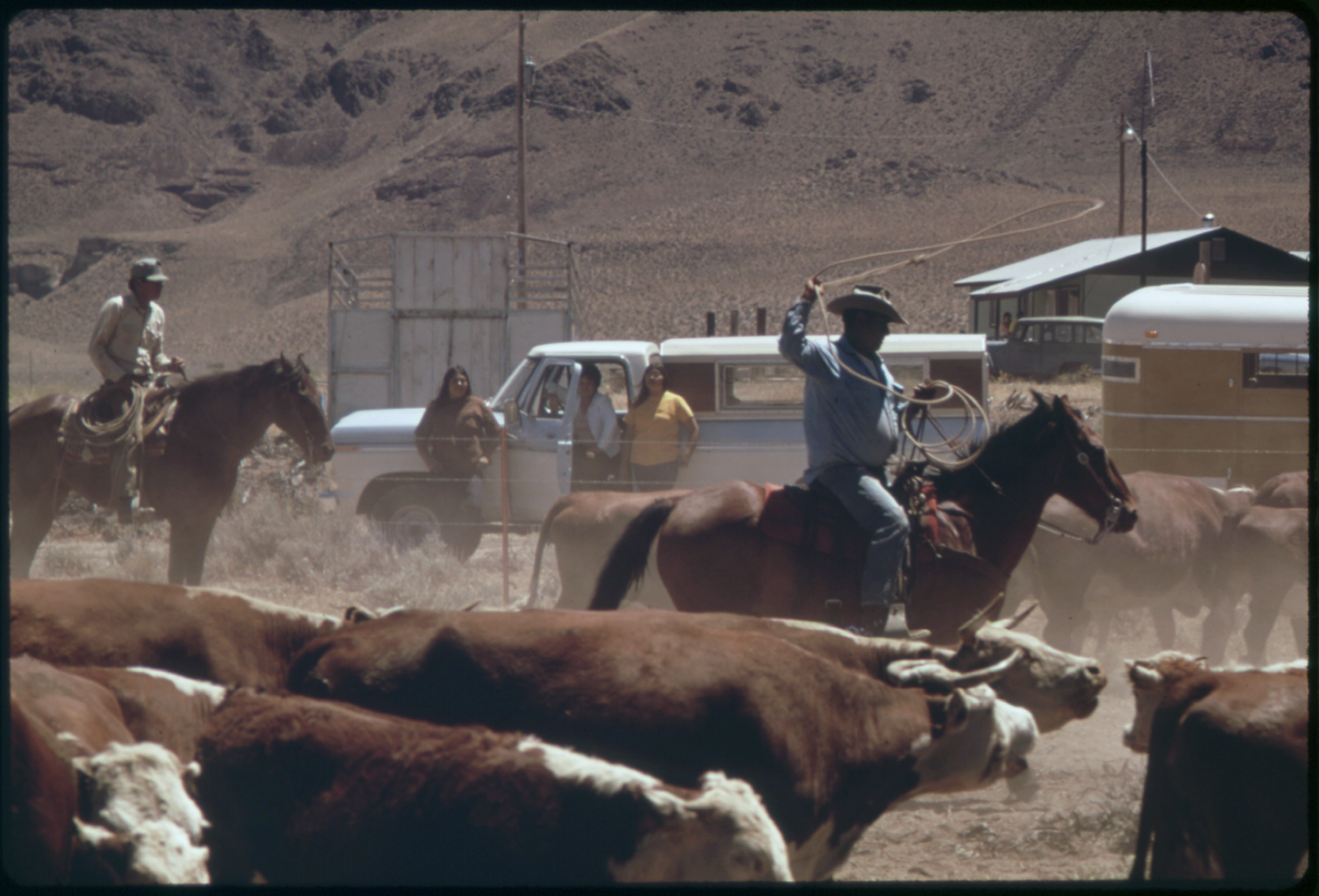
Spring roundup of Paiute-owned cattle begins at Pyramid Lake Indian Reservation, 1973.

Indian country today consists of tripartite government—i. e., federal, state and/or local, and tribal. Where state and local governments may exert some, but limited, law-and-order authority, tribal sovereignty is diminished. This situation prevails in connection with Indian gaming, because federal legislation makes the state a party to any contractual or statutory agreement.

Finally, occupancy on reservations can be by virtue of tribal or individual tenure. There are many churches on reservations; most would occupy tribal land by consent of the federal government or the tribe. Bureau of Indian Affairs (BIA) agency offices, hospitals, schools, and other facilities usually occupy residual federal parcels within reservations. Many reservations include one or more sections (about 640 acres) of land for schools, but such land typically remains part of the reservation (e.g., Enabling Act of 1910 at Section 20). As a general practice, such land may sit idle or be used for cattle grazing by tribal ranchers.

=== Gaming ===
In 1979, the Seminole tribe in Florida opened a high-stakes bingo operation on its reservation in Florida. The state attempted to close the operation down but was stopped in the courts. In the 1980s, the case of California v. Cabazon Band of Mission Indians established the right of reservations to operate other forms of gambling operations. In 1988, Congress passed the Indian Gaming Regulatory Act, which recognized the right of Native American tribes to establish gambling and gaming facilities on their reservations as long as the states in which they are located have some form of legalized gambling.

Today, many Native American casinos are used as tourist attractions, including as the basis for hotel and conference facilities, to draw visitors and revenue to reservations. Successful gaming operations on some reservations have improved the ability of tribes to provide investment towards infrastructure and education.

=== Law enforcement and crime ===
Serious crime on Indian reservations has historically been required (by the 1885 Major Crimes Act, 18 U.S.C. §§1153, 3242, and court decisions) to be investigated by the federal government, usually the Federal Bureau of Investigation, and prosecuted by United States Attorneys of the United States federal judicial district in which the reservation lies.

Tribal courts were limited to sentences of one year or less, until on July 29, 2010, the Tribal Law and Order Act was enacted which in some measure reforms the system permitting tribal courts to impose sentences of up to three years provided proceedings are recorded and additional rights are extended to defendants. The Justice Department on January 11, 2010, initiated the Indian Country Law Enforcement Initiative which recognizes problems with law enforcement on Indian reservations and assigns top priority to solving existing problems.

The Department of Justice recognizes the unique legal relationship that the United States has with federally recognized tribes. As one aspect of this relationship, in much of Indian Country, the Justice Department alone has the authority to seek a conviction that carries an appropriate potential sentence when a serious crime has been committed. Our role as the primary prosecutor of serious crimes makes our responsibility to citizens in Indian Country unique and mandatory. Accordingly, public safety in tribal communities is a top priority for the Department of Justice.

Emphasis was placed on improving prosecution of crimes involving domestic violence and sexual assault.

Passed in 1953, Public Law 280 (PL 280) gave jurisdiction over criminal offenses involving Indians in Indian Country to certain States and allowed other States to assume jurisdiction. Subsequent legislation allowed States to retrocede jurisdiction, which has occurred in some areas. Some PL 280 reservations have experienced jurisdictional confusion, tribal discontent, and litigation, compounded by the lack of data on crime rates and law enforcement response.

As of 2012, a high incidence of rape continued to impact Native American women.

==== Violence and substance abuse ====
A survey of death certificates over a four-year period showed that deaths among Indians due to alcohol are about four times as common as in the general U.S. population and are often due to traffic collisions and liver disease with homicide, suicide, and falls also contributing. Deaths due to alcohol among American Indians are more common in men and among Northern Plains Indians. Alaska Natives showed the least incidence of death. Under federal law, alcohol sales are prohibited on Indian reservations unless the tribal councils allow it.

Gang violence has become a major social problem. A December 13, 2009, article in The New York Times about growing gang violence on the Pine Ridge Indian Reservation estimated that there were 39 gangs with 5,000 members on that reservation alone. As opposed to traditional "Most Wanted" lists, Native Americans are often placed on regional Crime Stoppers lists offering rewards for their whereabouts.

== Disputes over land sovereignty ==
When the Europeans encountered the New World, the American colonial government determined a precedent of establishing the land sovereignty of North America through treaties between countries. This precedent was upheld by the United States government. As a result, most Native American land was purchased by the United States government, a portion of which was designated to remain under Native sovereignty. The United States government and Native Peoples do not always agree on how land should be governed, which has resulted in a series of disputes over sovereignty.

=== Black Hills land dispute ===
The Federal Government and The Lakota Sioux tribe members have been involved in sorting out a legal claim for the Black Hills since signing the 1868 Fort Laramie Treaty, which created what is known today as the Great Sioux Nation covering the Black Hills and nearly half of western South Dakota. This treaty was acknowledged and respected until 1874 when General George Custer discovered gold, sending a wave of settlers into the area and leading to the realization of the value of the land from United States President Grant. President Grant used tactical military force to remove the Sioux from the land and assisted in the development of the Congressional appropriations bill for Indian Services in 1876, a "starve or sell" treaty signed by only 10% of the 75% tribal men required based on specifications from the Fort Laramie Treaty that relinquished the Sioux's rights to the Black Hills. Following this treaty, the Agreement of 1877 was passed by Congress to remove the Sioux from the Black Hills, stating that the land was purchased from the Sioux despite the insufficient number of signatures, the lack of transaction records, and the tribe's claim that the land was never for sale.

The Black Hills are sacred to the Sioux as a place central to their spirituality and identity, and contest of ownership of the land has been pressured in the courts by the Sioux Nation since they were allowed legal avenue in 1920. Beginning in 1923, the Sioux made a legal claim that their relinquishment from the Black Hills was illegal under the Fifth Amendment, and no amount of money can make up for the loss of their sacred land. This claim went all the way up to the Supreme Court United States v. Sioux Nation of Indians case in 1979 after being revived by Congress, and the Sioux were awarded over $100 million as they ruled that the seizure of the Black Hills was in fact illegal. The Sioux have continually rejected the money, and since then the award has been accruing interest in trust accounts and amounts to about $1 billion in 2015.

During President Barack Obama's campaign, he made indications that the case of the Black Hills was going to be solved with innovative solutions and consultation, but this was questioned when White House Counsel Leonard Garment sent a note to The Ogala people saying, "The days of treaty-making with the American Indians ended in 1871; ...only Congress can rescind or change in any way statutes enacted since 1871." The He Sapa Reparations Alliance was established after Obama's inauguration to educate the Sioux people and propose a bill to Congress that would allocate 1.3 million acres of federal land within the Black Hills to the tribe. To this day, the dispute of the Black Hills is ongoing with the trust estimated to be worth nearly $1.3 billion and sources believe principles of restorative justice may be the best solution to addressing this century-old dispute.

=== Haudenosaunee land claims in Upstate New York ===
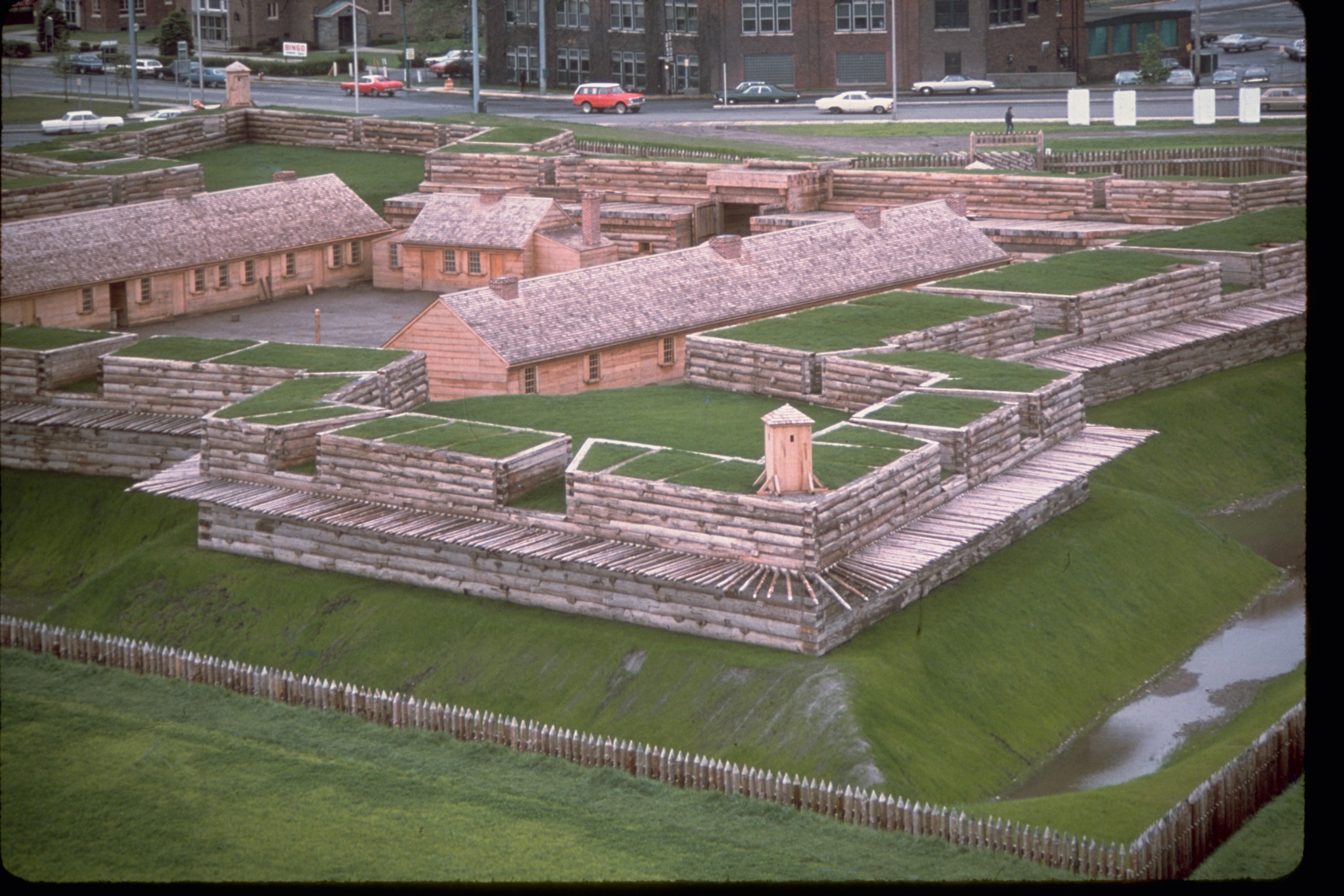
Fort Stanwix, New York

While the 1783 Treaty of Paris, which ended the American Revolution, addressed land sovereignty disputes between the British Crown and the colonies, it neglected to settle hostilities between Indigenous people—specifically those who fought on the side of the British, as four of the members of the Haudenosaunee did—and colonists. In October 1784 the newly formed United States government facilitated negotiations with representatives from the Six Nations in Fort Stanwix, New York. The treaty produced in 1784 resulted in Indians giving up their territory within the Ohio River Valley and the U.S. guaranteeing the Haudenosaunee six million acres—about half of what is present-day New York—as permanent homelands.

Unenthusiastic about the treaty's conditions, the state of New York secured a series of 26 "leases", many of them lasting 999 years on all Native territories within its boundaries. Led to believe that they had already lost their land to the New York Genesee Company, the Haudenosaunee agreed to land leasing which was presented by New York Governor George Clinton as a means by which the Indigenous nations could maintain sovereignty over their land. On August 28, 1788, the Oneida people leased five million acres to the state in exchange for $2,000 in cash, $2,000 in clothing, $1,000 in provisions and $600 annual rent. The other two tribes followed with similar arrangements.

The Holland Land Company gained control over all but ten acres of the Native land leased to the state on 15 September 1797. These 397 square miles were subsequently parceled out and subleased to whites, allegedly ending the Native title to land. Despite Haudenosaunee protests, federal authorities did virtually nothing to correct the injustice. Certain of losing all of their lands, in 1831 most of the Oneidas asked that what was left of their holdings be exchanged for 500,000 acres purchased from the Menominees in Wisconsin. President Andrew Jackson, committed to Indian Removal west of the Mississippi, agreed.

The Treaty of Buffalo Creek signed on 15 January 1838, directly ceded 102,069 acres of Seneca land to the Ogden company for $202,000, a sum that was divided evenly between the government—to hold in trust for Indians—and non-Indian individuals who wanted to buy and improve the plots. All that was left of the Cayuga, Oneida, Onondaga and Tuscarora holding was extinguished at a total cost of $400,000 to Ogden.

After Indian complaints, a second Treaty of Buffalo was written in 1842 in attempts to mediate tension. Under this treaty the Haudenosaunee were given the right to reside in New York and small areas of reservations were restored by the U.S. government.

These agreements were largely ineffective in protecting Native American land. By 1889 eighty percent of all Haudenosaunee reservation land in New York was leased by non-Haudenosaunees.

=== Navajo–Hopi land dispute ===
The modern-day Navajo and Hopi Indian Reservations are located in Northern Arizona, near the Four Corners area. The Hopi reservation is 2,531.773 square miles (6,557.26 km^{2}) within Arizona and lies surrounded by the greater Navajo reservation which spans 27,413 square miles (71,000 km^{2}) and extends slightly into the states of New Mexico and Utah. The Hopi, also known as the Pueblo people, made many spiritually motivated migrations throughout the Southwest before settling in present-day Northern Arizona. The Navajo people also migrated throughout western North America following spiritual commands before settling near the Grand Canyon area. The two tribes peacefully coexisted and even traded and exchanged ideas with each other. Their way of life was threatened when the "New people", what the Navajo called white settlers, began conquering native tribes across the continent and claiming their land, as a result of Andrew Jackson's Indian Removal Act. War ensued between the Navajo people, who call themselves the Diné, and new Americans. The result was the Long Walk in the early 1860s in which the entire tribe was forced to walk roughly 400 miles (640 km) from Fort Canby (present-day Window Rock, Arizona) to Bosque Redondo in New Mexico. This march is similar to the well-known Cherokee Trail of Tears and like it, many of the tribe did not survive the trek. The roughly 11,000 tribe members were imprisoned here in what the United States government deemed an experimental Indian reservation that failed because it became too expensive, there were too many people to feed, and they were continuously raided by other Native tribes. Consequently, in 1868, the Navajo were allowed to return to their homeland after signing the Treaty of Bosque Redondo. The treaty officially established the "Navajo Indian Reservation" in Northern Arizona. The term reservation is one that creates territorialities or claims on places. This treaty gave them the right to the land and semi-autonomous governance of it. The Hopi reservation, on the other hand, was created through an executive order by President Arthur in 1882.

A few years after the two reservations were established, the Dawes Allotment Act was passed under which communal tribal land was divvied up and allocated to each household in an attempt to enforce European-American farming styles where each family owns and works their own plot of land. This was a further act of enclosure by the U.S. government. Each family received 640 acres (260 ha) or less and the remaining land was deemed "surplus" because it was more than the tribes needed. This "surplus" land was then made available for purchase by American citizens.

The land designated to the Navajo and Hopi reservation was originally considered barren and unproductive by white settlers until 1921 when prospectors scoured the land for oil. The mining companies pressured the U.S. government to set up Native American councils on the reservations so that they could agree to contracts, specifically leases, in the name of the tribe.

During World War II, uranium was mined on the Diné and Hopi reservations. The dangers of radiation exposure were not adequately explained to the Native people, who made up almost all the workforce of these mines, and lived in their immediate adjacency. As a result, some residents who lived near the uranium projects used the quarried rock from the mines to build their houses, these materials were radioactive and had detrimental health effects on the residents, including increased rates of kidney failure and cancer. During extraction some Native children would play in large water pools which were heavily contaminated with uranium created by mining activities. The companies also failed to properly dispose of the radioactive waste which did and will continue to pollute the environment, including the Natives' water sources. Many years later, these same men who worked the mines died from lung cancer, and their families received no form of financial compensation.

In 1979, the Church Rock uranium mill spill was the largest release of radioactive waste in U.S. history. The spill contaminated the Puerco River with 1,000 tons of solid radioactive waste and 93 million gallons of acidic, radioactive tailings solution which flowed downstream into the Navajo Nation. The Navajos used the water from this river for irrigation and their livestock but were not immediately informed about the contamination and its danger.

After the war ended, the American population boomed and energy demands soared. The utility companies needed a new source of power so they began the construction of coal-fired power plants. They placed these power plants in the four corners region. In the 1960s, John Boyden, an attorney working for both Peabody Coal and the Hopi tribe, the nation's largest coal producer, managed to gain rights to the Hopi land, including Black Mesa, a sacred location to both tribes which lay partially within the Joint Use Area of both tribes.

Some consider this to be an example of environmental racism and injustice, per the principles established by the Participants of the First National People of Color Environmental Leadership Summit, because the Navajo and Hopi people, which are communities of color, low income, and political alienation, were disproportionately affected by the proximity and the resulting pollution of these power plants which disregard their right to clean air, their land was degraded, and because the related public policies are not based on mutual respect of all people.

The mining companies, however, wanted more land but the joint ownership of the land made negotiations difficult. At the same time, Hopi and Navajo tribes were squabbling over land rights while Navajo livestock continuously grazed on Hopi land. Boyden took advantage of this situation, presenting it to the House Subcommittee on Indian Affairs claiming that if the government did not step in and do something, a bloody war would ensue between the tribes. Congressmen agreed to pass the Navajo-Hopi Land Settlement Act of 1974 which forced any Hopi and Navajo people living on the other's land to relocate. This affected 6,000 Navajo people and ultimately benefitted coal companies the most who could now more easily access the disputed land. Instead of using military violence to deal with those who refused to move, the government passed what became known as the Bennett Freeze to encourage the people to leave. The Bennett Freeze banned 1.5 million acres (6,100 km^{2}) of Navajo land from any type of development, including paving roadways and even roof repair. This was meant to be a temporary incentive to push tribe negotiations but lasted over forty years until 2009 when President Obama lifted the moratorium. The legacy of the Bennett Freeze looms over the region as seen by the nearly third-world conditions on the reservation – seventy-five percent of people do not have access to electricity and housing situations are poor.

=== Eastern Oklahoma ===
The reservations of the Five Civilized Tribes that were the subject of McGirt v. Oklahoma

The Oklahoma Court of Criminal Appeals has recognized in the 21st century the existence of several Indian reservations in Ottawa County

Much of what is now Oklahoma was considered Indian Territory from the 1830s. The tribes in the area attempted to join the union as the Native-led State of Sequoyah in 1905 as a means of retaining control of their lands, but this was unsuccessful and the lands were merged into Oklahoma with the Enabling Act of 1906. This act had been taken to disestablish the reservation in order for the foundation of the state to proceed. In July 2020, the Supreme Court ruled in McGirt v. Oklahoma that the area, about half of the modern state, never lost its status as a Native reservation. This includes most part of the city of Tulsa (most of Tulsa is part of the territory of the Muscogee Nation, Northwest Tulsa lies in the Osage Nation, and North Tulsa is within the Cherokee Nation). Eastern Oklahoma includes lands of the Chickasaw, Choctaw, Cherokee, Muscogee, and Seminole. The ruling is based on an 1832 treaty, which the court ruled was still in force, adding that "Because Congress has not said otherwise, we hold the government to its word."

In 2021, the Oklahoma Court of Criminal Appeals upheld a lower court ruling that the Quapaw Nation's reservation in Ottawa County in northeastern Oklahoma was never disestablished. In 2024, the Oklahoma Court of Criminal Appeals ruled that the Wyandotte Nation's reservation was also never disestablished. Court rulings also confirmed the existence of the reservations of the Miami Tribe of Oklahoma, Peoria Tribe of Indians of Oklahoma, and Ottawa Tribe of Oklahoma.

== Life and culture ==
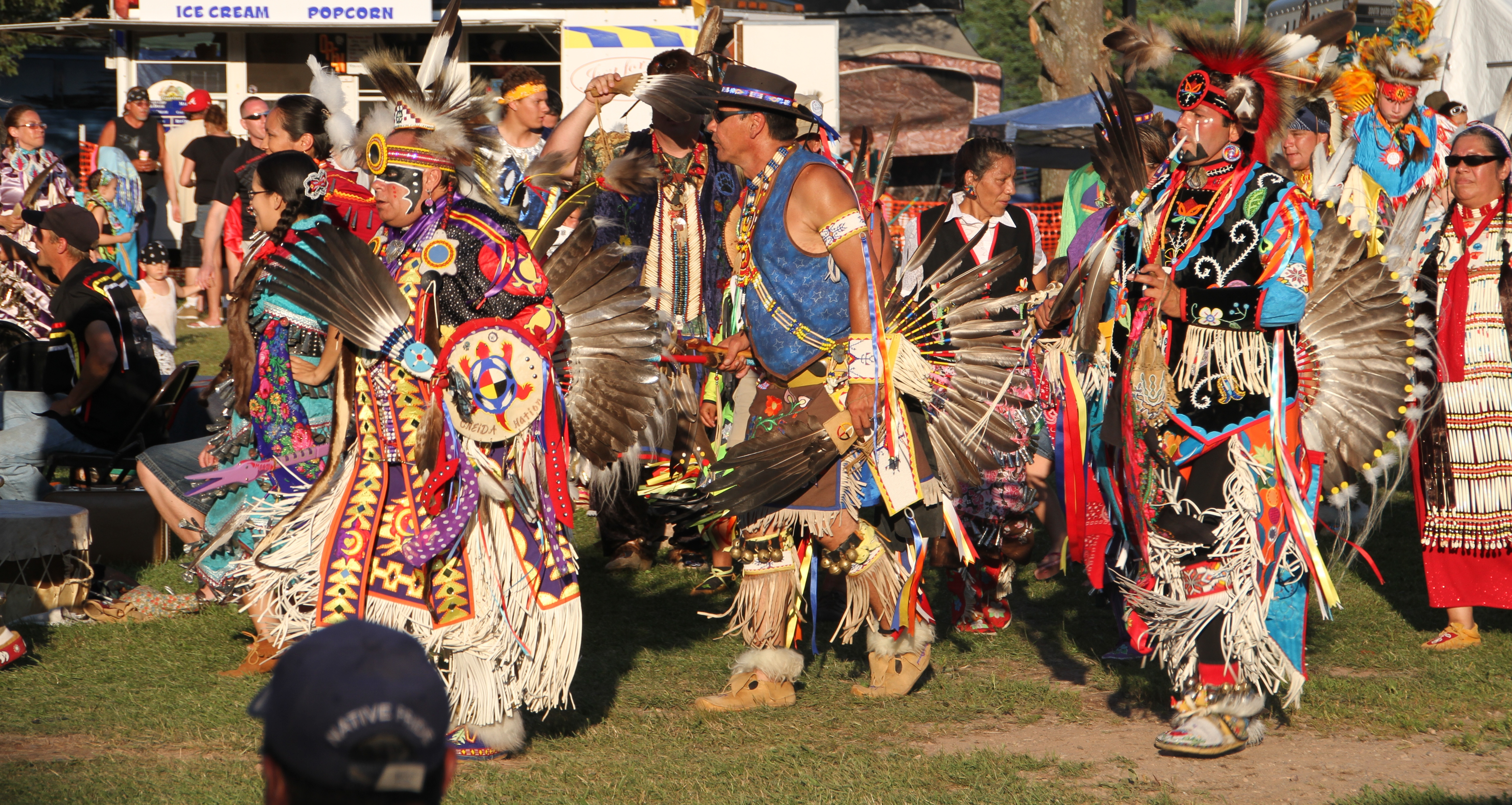
Red Cliff Indian Reservation in Wisconsin during their annual powwow

Many Native Americans who live on reservations interact with the federal government through two agencies: the Bureau of Indian Affairs and the Indian Health Service.

The standard of living on some reservations is comparable to that in the developing world, with problems of infant mortality, low life expectancy, poor nutrition, poverty, and alcohol and drug abuse. The two poorest counties in the United States are Buffalo County, South Dakota, home of the Crow Creek Indian Reservation, and Oglala Lakota County, South Dakota, home of the Pine Ridge Indian Reservation, according to data compiled by the 2000 census. This disparity in living standards can partly be explained by centuries-long instances of settler colonialism which have systematically harmed Indigenous peoples' relations with land, and have attempted to erase their cultural ways of life. Potawatomi scholar Kyle Powys Whyte has stated,

"While Indigenous peoples, as any society, have long histories of adapting to change, colonialism caused changes at such a rapid pace that many Indigenous peoples became vulnerable to harms, from health problems related to new diets to erosion of their cultures to the destruction of Indigenous diplomacy, to which they were not as susceptible prior to colonization."

This has resulted in an ever widening disparity between Native peoples and the rest of the United States.

It is commonly believed that environmentalism and a connectedness to nature are ingrained in the Native American culture. However, this is a generalization. In recent years, cultural historians have set out to reconstruct and complicate this notion as what they claim to be a culturally inaccurate romanticism. Others recognize the differences between the attitudes and perspectives that emerge from a comparison of Western European philosophy and Traditional Ecological Knowledge (TEK) of Indigenous peoples, especially when considering natural resource conflicts and management strategies involving multiple parties.

== Environmental issues ==
The lands on which reservations are located are disproportionately low in natural resources and quality soil conducive to fostering economic prosperity. Starting in the mid-20th century reservations came to be increasingly located in areas contaminated with toxic runoff from current or historical industrial activities conducted by outside entities including private corporations as well as the federal government. According to anthropologists Merrill Singer and Derrick Hodge: "The toxic and poor land quality of Native American lands is neither a historical accident nor the result of any cultural deficiency on their part, but rather is the result of aggressive westward economic expansion. This process was calculated and unconcerned with indigenous wellbeing. [...] Thus, federal policy, including the Indian Removal Act of 1830, was designed to displace Native Americans from coveted land and to relocate them to areas seen as relatively "valueless by nineteenth century standards".

Communities living on Native reservations are also disproportionately affected by environmental hazards. Due to them being deemed as "undesirable", lands on and near reservations are often used by the U.S. government and private industries as areas for environmentally hazardous activities. These activities include uranium mining, nuclear waste disposal, and military testing. Due to this, many reservation communities have been subjected to adverse health issues. Specifically, according to scholar Traci Lynn Voyles, the Navajo Nation has been affected for decades by uranium mining and nuclear waste dumping:

"Radiation-related diseases are now endemic to many parts of the Navajo Nation, claiming the health and lives of former miners to be sure but also those of Navajos who would never see the inside of a mine. Diné children have a rate of testicular and ovarian cancer fifteen times the national average, and a fatal neurological disease called Navajo neuropathy has been closely linked to ingesting uranium-contaminated water during pregnancy".

Other reservation communities have been subjected to instances like this as well. According to scholar Winona LaDuke, the Paiute- Shoshone community was deliberately exposed to radiation throughout the latter half of the 20th century:

"In 1951 the Atomic Energy Commission set up the Nevada Test Site within Western Shoshone territory as a proving grounds for nuclear weapons. Between 1951 and 1992, the U.S. and UK exploded 1,054 nuclear devices above and below ground [...] According to Sanchez, the Atomic Energy Commission would deliberately wait for clouds to blow north before conducting tests, so that the fallout would avoid any heavily populated areas such as Las Vegas and Los Angeles. This meant that the Shoshones would get a larger dose."

Many Indigenous communities have also been subjected to the degradation of sacred lands in favor of resource extraction. Around 79 percent of the lithium deposits on U.S. soil are within 35 miles of Indian reservations. Thacker Pass is home to both one of the largest lithium deposits in the world and home to a sacred burial site of multiple tribes including the Pitt River and Paiute. In 2021, the mining company Lithium Nevada was granted permission to mine the area by the Bureau of Land Management. Tribal members argue that these permits were unlawfully issued, and that "the BLM notified only three of Nevada's 27 tribes about the mine".

Historically, Indigenous groups have had little say when it comes to which land they are designated to occupy, as well as what happens to the land. This can be explained by the following excerpt from an academic journal on the impacts of climate change in the Arctic: "While a government-to-government relationship is now officially required, these cases (which continue to define the indigenous/federal relationship in the U.S.) instituted a federal 'trust responsibility' for indigenous people in the U.S., codifying a legal relationship of paternalism that limits the autonomy of tribal governments. The United States government is thus under a legal obligation to protect the lands, resources and traditionally used areas of indigenous peoples, and government agencies are required to consult with tribal governments and Alaska Native Corporations in natural resource decision-making. While some view this form of representation as the best and only practical means of influencing Northern policy, the actual involvement of tribal governments has been limited, and seen as perfunctory, and may be precluded by the procedural and structural mandates of federal law and legal precedent." We can see this with the amount of reservations placed near massive construction projects that lead to pollution, such as landfills or the Dakotas Access Pipeline. In addition, the lands that Indigenous people are designated to occupy by the federal government typically have difficulties already. As explained by scholars Gregory Hooks and Chad Smith in their academic journal connecting the focus on production to environmental issues, "Federally owned and Native American lands tended to be in close proximity, and they had a great deal in common: they were concentrated in the states west of the Mississippi, and they tended to be lands that were too dry, remote, or barren to attract the attention of settlers and corporations."

Reservations are often designated or located close to "superfund sites" areas designated by the U.S. Environmental Protection Agency (EPA) as polluted and hazardous to live in and requiring action to clean up. In 2014, of 1,322 Superfund sites in the United States, 532 or almost 25% where in Indian Country. Some of these include the Jackpile-Paguate Uranium Mine on the Pueblo of Laguna, the St. Regis Paper Company on the Leech Lake Band of Ojibwe's reservation, and the Sulphur Bank Mercury Mine on the Elem Band of Pomo Indians' reservation.

== See also ==
- Hawaiian home land
- Indian Claims Commission
- Indian colony
- Indian country
- List of historical Indian reservations in the United States
- List of Indian reservations in the United States
- Native American reservation politics
- Osage in Kansas
- Reservation poverty
- Reservations in Nebraska

Outside the U.S.:

- Ranchería
- Rancherie (term used in British Columbia)
- Indigenous Protected Area in Australia
- Native Community Lands in Bolivia
- Indigenous territory (Brazil)
- Indian reserve in Canada
- Indigenous territory (Colombia)
- Indigenous territories of Costa Rica
- Autonomous administrative divisions of India
- Indigenous Area (Taiwan)
