= List of ghost towns in New Mexico =

This is a partial list of ghost towns in New Mexico in the United States of America.

== Conditions ==
Ghost towns can include sites in various states of disrepair and abandonment. Some sites no longer have any trace of buildings or civilization and have reverted to empty land. Other sites are unpopulated but still have standing buildings. Still others may support full-time residents, though usually far less than at their historical peak, while others may now be museums or historical sites.

For ease of reference, the sites listed have been placed into one of the following general categories.

Barren site

- Site is no longer in existence
- Site has been destroyed, covered with water, or reverted to empty land
- May have a few difficult to find foundations/footings at most

Neglected site

- Little more than rubble remains at the site
- Dilapidated, often roofless buildings remain at the site

Abandoned site

- Building or houses still standing, but all or almost all are abandoned
- No population, with the possible exception of a caretaker
- Site no longer in use, except for one or two buildings

Semi-abandoned site

- Buildings or houses still standing, but most are abandoned
- A few residents may remain

Historic site

- Buildings or houses still standing
- Site has been converted to a historical site, museum, or tourist attraction
- Still a busy community, but population is smaller than its peak years

== Ghost towns ==
Town name	Other name(s)	County	Location	Settled	Abandoned	Current status	Remarks
Alamocita	New Alamosa	Sierra		1867	1880	Submerged	Town was abandoned in 1880, due to change in the course of the Rio Grande, some ranches remained. Site was submerged by the Elephant Butte Reservoir.
Aleman	Aleman Ranch	Sierra		1868	1875	Historic site	Buildings on the Bar Cross Ranch
Anaconda	-	Cibola		1952	1982	Barren site	A former mining town that also once contained the only medical facility between Albuquerque and Gallup.
Arkansas Junction	-	Lea	32°41′38.44″N 103°21′3.76″W			Semi-abandoned site	Not much is left of the former community except a cafe that serves the local oil field workers.
Baldy Town	Baldy Camp, Chihuahua, Aztec Spring	Colfax	36° 37′ 26.32″ N, 105° 10′ 18.97″ W	1888	1940	Historic site	The site is part of the Philmont Boy Scout Ranch. It has stone ruins and mill foundations which are a part of historic programming.
Bard	-	Quay		-	-	Abandoned site	-
Blackdom	-	Chaves		1901	-	-	-
Bland	-	Sandoval	35°45′31.29″N 106°28′2.08″W	1893	early 1900s	Barren site	Destroyed in the 2011 Las Conchas Fire, some foundations remain.
Bonanza City	-	Santa Fe		1880	early 1900s	Barren site	-
Bramlett	-	Hidalgo		-	-	-	-
Buckman	-	Santa Fe		1899	1925	Barren site	-
Cabezon	-	Sandoval		-	-	-	Private property. Several structures remain.
Cambray	-	Luna		1892	-	Neglected site	Private property. Structures remain in various states of disrepair.
Canta Recio	-	Socorro		1875	1920	Barren site	Site was submerged by the Elephant Butte Reservoir.
Carpenter	-	Grant		-	-	-	-
Chise	Chiz	Sierra		-	-	-	Populated Place.
Chloride	-	Sierra		1881	1956	Historic site	An unincorporated community
Clairmont	-	Catron		-	-	-	-
Cloverdale	-	Hidalgo		-	-	-	-
Cooney	-	Catron		-	-	-	-
Cuchillo	Cuchillo Negro	Sierra		1867-1871	-	Historic site	An unincorporated community. Name change came after the 1900 Census, it was recorded under its present name in the 1910 Census.
Cuervo	-	Guadalupe		1901	-	Abandoned site	-
Dawson	-	Colfax		1901	1950	Abandoned Site	Once Large City, suffered two major mining incidents totaling some 400 casualties, Phelps Dodge Company cleared the town of relics and infrastructure
El Ojo Del Padre	-	Sandoval		-	-	-	-
Elephant Butte	-	Sierra		-	-	-	-
Elizabethtown	-	Colfax		1866	1917	Abandoned Site	Once largest town in New Mexico. Ruins of one stone structure is all that remains, most wooden structures lost in 1903 fire.
Endee	-	Quay		c.1885	-	Abandoned site	Founded as a supply center for ranches in the area.
Folsom	-	Union		-	-	-	-
Gary	-	Hidalgo		-	-	-	-
Glenrio	Rock Island	Quay (partially in Deaf Smith County, Texas)		-	-	-	-
Gage	-	Luna		-	-	-	-
Gobernador	-	Rio Arriba		-	-	-	-
Gran Quivira	-	Socorro		-	-	-	(now part of the Salinas Pueblo Missions National Monument)
Hagan	-	Sandoval		1902	1931	Neglected site	-
Hermosa	-	Sierra		-	-	-	Mostly private property, but several structures remain. Ranch is owned by Ted Turner.
Jicarilla		Lincoln		1892	1942	Abandoned site	Half a dozen structures remain at the site, including both former schoolhouses.
Kelly	-	Socorro		-	-	Historic site	Founded in 1866 after Patrick H. Kelly staked lead, Zinc and silver; mining sustained the town until prices declined. Small population and guided tours remain.
La Belle	Labelle	Taos		1894	1910	Barren site	The town was founded as a result of a gold mine and ceased when the mining ended.
Lake Valley	-	Sierra		-	-	Historic site	-
Lanark	-	Doña Ana		-	-	-	-
Mentmore	-	McKinley		-	-	-	(still has post office and zip code 87319)
Montoya	-	Quay		1902	-	Abandoned site	Originally founded as a railroad stop in 1902. A Sinclair gasoline station operated from 1925 to the mid-1970s.
Mogollon	-	Catron		-	-	-	-
Mowry City	-	Doña Ana		-	-	-	-
Newkirk	Conant (formerly)	Guadalupe		c. 1900-1910	-	Semi-abandoned site	In the 2010 census, Newkirk had a population of 7.
Old Hachita	-	Grant		-	-	-	Several structures remain, including mine headframes.
Paraje	-	Socorro		1857	1942	Barren site	Site was submerged by the Elephant Butte Reservoir. Later exposed, some ruins and artifacts can be seen.
Pinos Altos (High Pines)	-	Grant		1860	-	Historic site	Still has some people there, located near Silver City
Pittsburg	-	Colfax		-	-	-	-
Red Hill	-	Catron		-	-	-	-
Road Fork	-	Hidalgo		-	-	-	-
Santa Barbara	Hatch	Doña Ana		1851, 1853	1851, 1860	Historic site	The village was abandoned in 1851 because of Apache raids and in 1860 by a Navajo raid. It was not re-occupied until 1875 and was renamed as Hatch.
San Albino	-	Sierra		1869	1914	Barren site	Site was submerged by the Elephant Butte Reservoir.
San José	-	Sierra		1869	1916	Barren site	Site was submerged by the Elephant Butte Reservoir.
San Marcial	-	Socorro		1854, 1866	1866, 1929	Neglected site	Destroyed by flood 1866, rebuilt on opposite bank of the Rio Grande, destroyed by flood in 1929 and abandoned.
San Ygnacio de la Alamosa	Alamosa, Cañada Alamosa	Sierra		1859	1867	Barren site	Abandoned after destruction by flooding in 1867. Site was submerged by the Elephant Butte Reservoir.
Santa Rita	Santa Rita del Cobre	Grant		1801, 1873	1838, 1967	Barren site	Town site swallowed up by the open pit copper mine several times.
Shakespeare	Mexican Springs, Grant, Ralston City	Hidalgo		1862	1929	Historic site	Currently part of a privately owned ranch, sometimes open to tourists.
Steins	Stein's Pass	Hidalgo		1880	1944	-	-
Tejon	-	Guadalupe		-	-	-	-
Twining	-	Taos		-	-	-	(site of Taos Ski Valley)
Tyrone	-	Grant		-	-	-	-
Valedon	-	Hidalgo		-	-	-	-
Vinegaroon	-	Otero		-	-	-	(east of La Luz, New Mexico; at the mouth of La Borcita)
White Oaks		Lincoln		1879	Early 1900s	Historic site	
Zapata	Zapato	Sierra		1869	1908	Abandoned site	Site was submerged by the Elephant Butte Reservoir.

== See also ==
- American Old West
- New Mexico Territory
