= Canta Recio, New Mexico =

Ghost town in Socorro County, New Mexico

Coordinates: 33.559°N 107.083°W

Canta Recio (meaning sings loudly in Spanish), was a native New Mexican settlement, now a ghost town in Socorro County, New Mexico, United States. It was located 40 miles south of Socorro, on the west bank of the Rio Grande, south of Milligan Gulch.

== History ==
Canta Recio was a small settlement, established by 1875 as the first Apache War was ending. It was located along the road on the west side of the Rio Grande, south of Fort Craig. By 1880, it was the first stop after San Marcial on the stage route to the mining towns of the Black Range. It remained in existence until 1920, when the land of the area was condemned for the Elephant Butte Reservoir and inundated. Nothing remains of this place.

== See also ==
- List of ghost towns in New Mexico
