= Twining, New Mexico =

Unincorporated community in New Mexico, United States

- Unincorporated community
- Location within New Mexico Location within the United States
- Coordinates: 36°35′41″N 105°27′01″W
- Country: United States
- State: New Mexico
- County: Taos
- Elevation: 9,429 ft (2,874 m)
- Time zone: UTC-7 (Mountain (MST))
  - Summer (DST): UTC-6 (MDT)
- Area code: 575
- GNIS feature ID: 911939

Twining is a ghost town in Taos County, New Mexico, United States.

Originally called Amizette, this was a small mining district with copper, gold and silver lodes, established in 1893 but abandoned by 1895. About 1902, Prospector William Frazer discovered further copper and gold in the canyon east of the townsite, and persuaded New Jersey banker Albert C. Twining to invest $300,000 in a smelter. On its first firing, molten ore froze to the sides of the furnace, making it unusable. Bankruptcy followed, and the townsite was abandoned by 1910.

In 1955 the site was acquired by Ernie Blake, who developed it into Taos Ski Valley. Virtually no trace now remains of the original village.

== See also ==
- List of ghost towns in New Mexico
