= Old Hachita, New Mexico =

Ghost town in Grant County, New Mexico, United States

Coordinates: 31°54′50″N 108°25′58″W

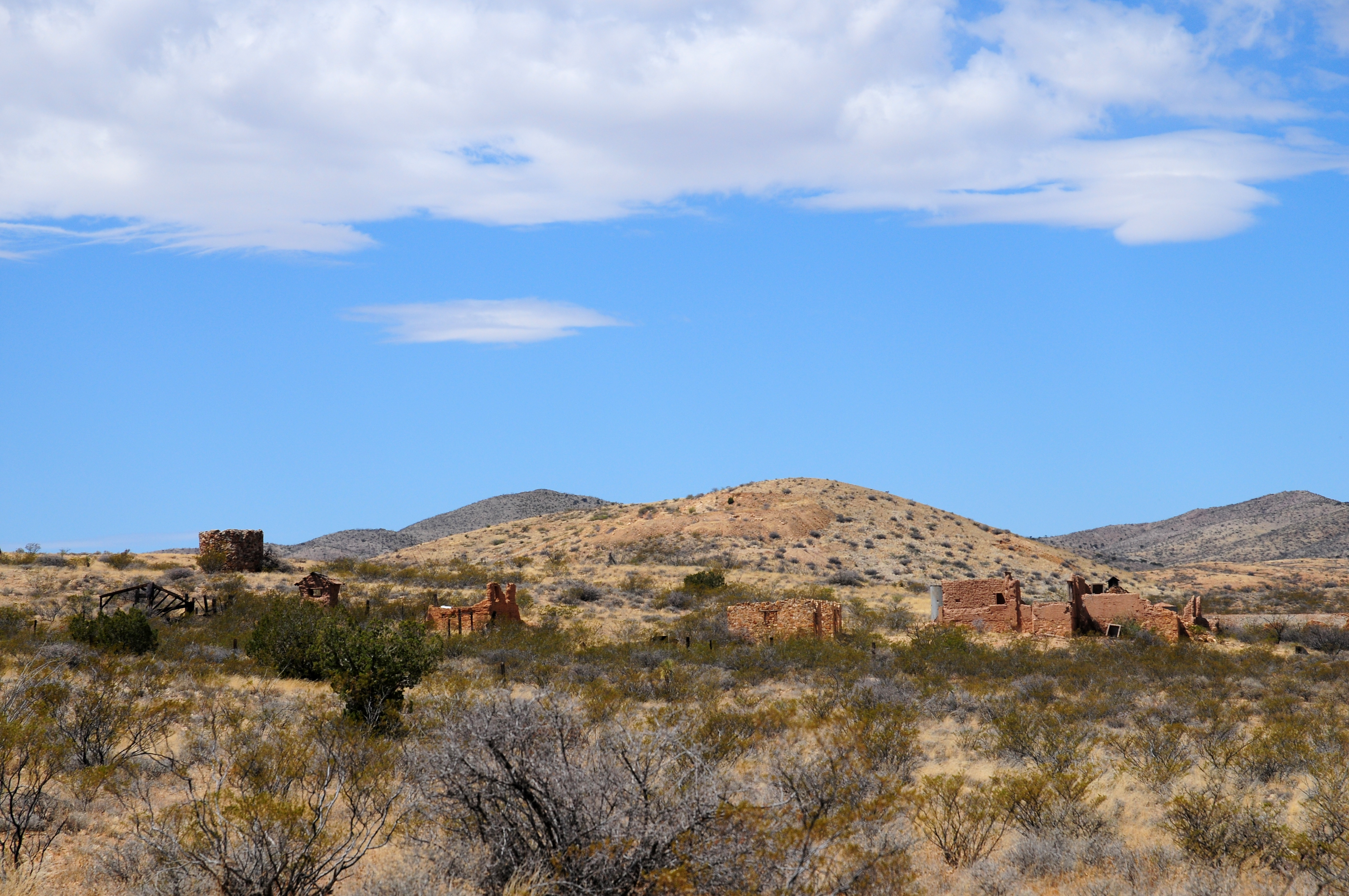
Site of Old Hachita, New Mexico

Old Hachita is a ghost town in New Mexico. Once a sizeable mining town, Old Hachita is now abandoned.

== See also ==
- List of ghost towns in New Mexico
