= Lanark, New Mexico =

Coordinates: 31°58′12″N 106°48′59″W

Lanark is a ghost town in Doña Ana County, New Mexico about 30 miles northwest of El Paso, Texas and close to Kilbourne Hole.

== History ==
Lanark had a U.S. Post Office from 1905 until 1923. Extant is a "small collection of buildings, water tank, and fuel depot built for trains on the Southern Pacific Railroad track from El Paso, Texas to Los Angeles."

== See also ==
- List of ghost towns in New Mexico
