= Jicarilla, New Mexico =

Ghost town in New Mexico, US

Coordinates: 33°52′08″N 105°39′47″W

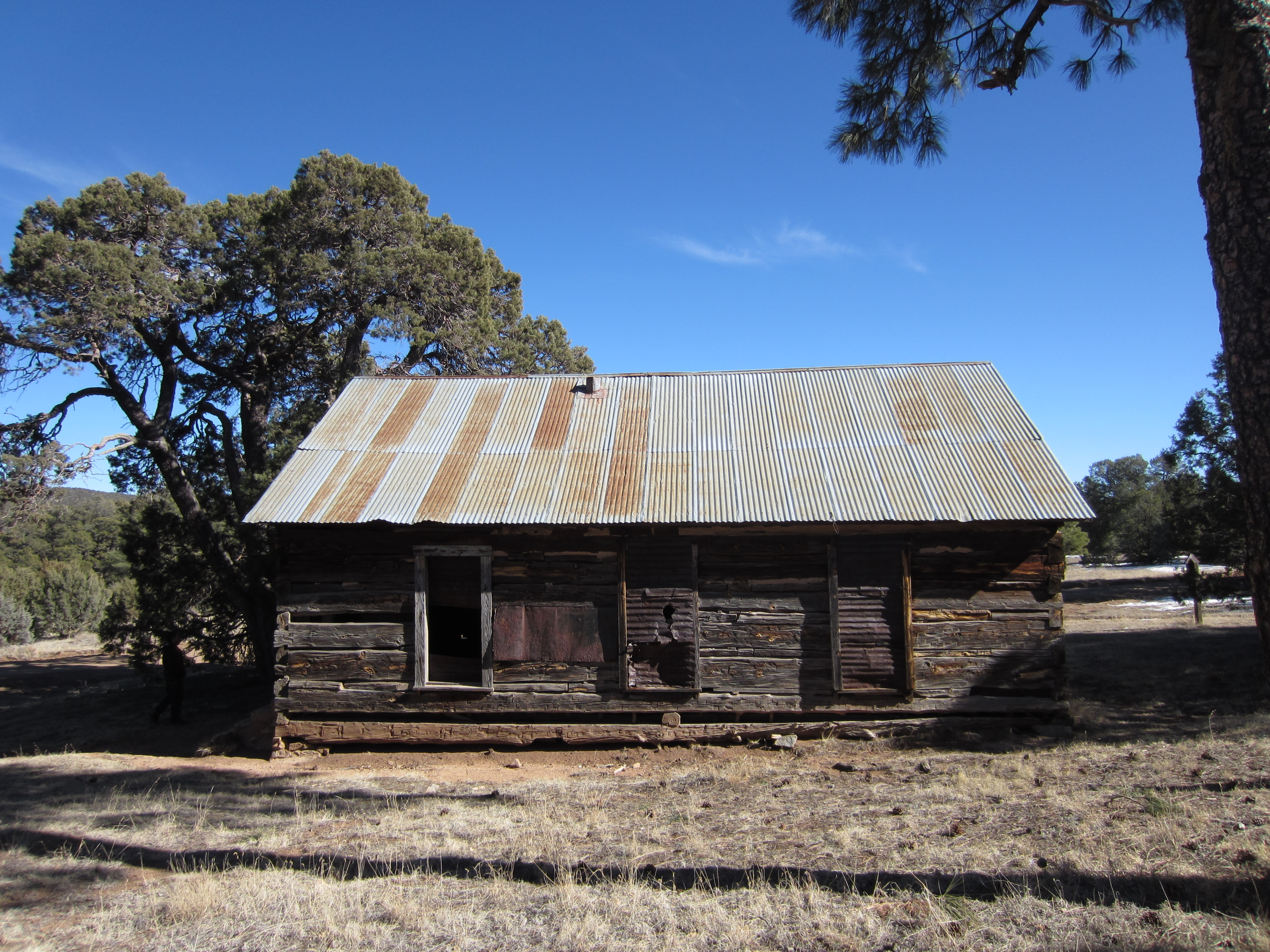
Jicarilla, New Mexico abandoned school house, built 1907

Jicarilla is a ghost town in Lincoln County, in the U.S. state of New Mexico. It became a boomtown in 1892 following the discovery of gold and coal in the nearby Jicarilla Mountains.

Known as the Ghost Town, there is not much left standing today. Jicarilla lasted for about 50 years, between 1892 and 1942.

== History ==
A post office was established at Jicarilla in 1892, and remained in operation until 1927. The community was named after the Jicarilla Apache Nation.

The Jicarilla Schoolhouse, a one-room log schoolhouse, was built in 1907 and is listed on the National Register of Historic Places.

== See also ==
- List of ghost towns in New Mexico
