= Jicarilla Mountains =

Mountain range in New Mexico, United States

- Location within New Mexico

Highest point
- Peak: Ancho Peak
- Elevation: 2,385 m (7,825 ft)
- Coordinates: 33°51′09″N 105°39′50″W

Geography
- Location: Lincoln County, New Mexico
- Range coordinates: 33°52′N 105°40′W

The Jicarilla Mountains, also called Sacramento Mountains, are a mountain range in Lincoln County, New Mexico in the southwestern United States, south to the Guadalupe Mountains, one of the highest peaks in the territory and a placer mining district in New Mexico. The Jicarilla Mountains were named after the Jicarilla Apache Nation. The Sacramento Mountains lie to the southwest.

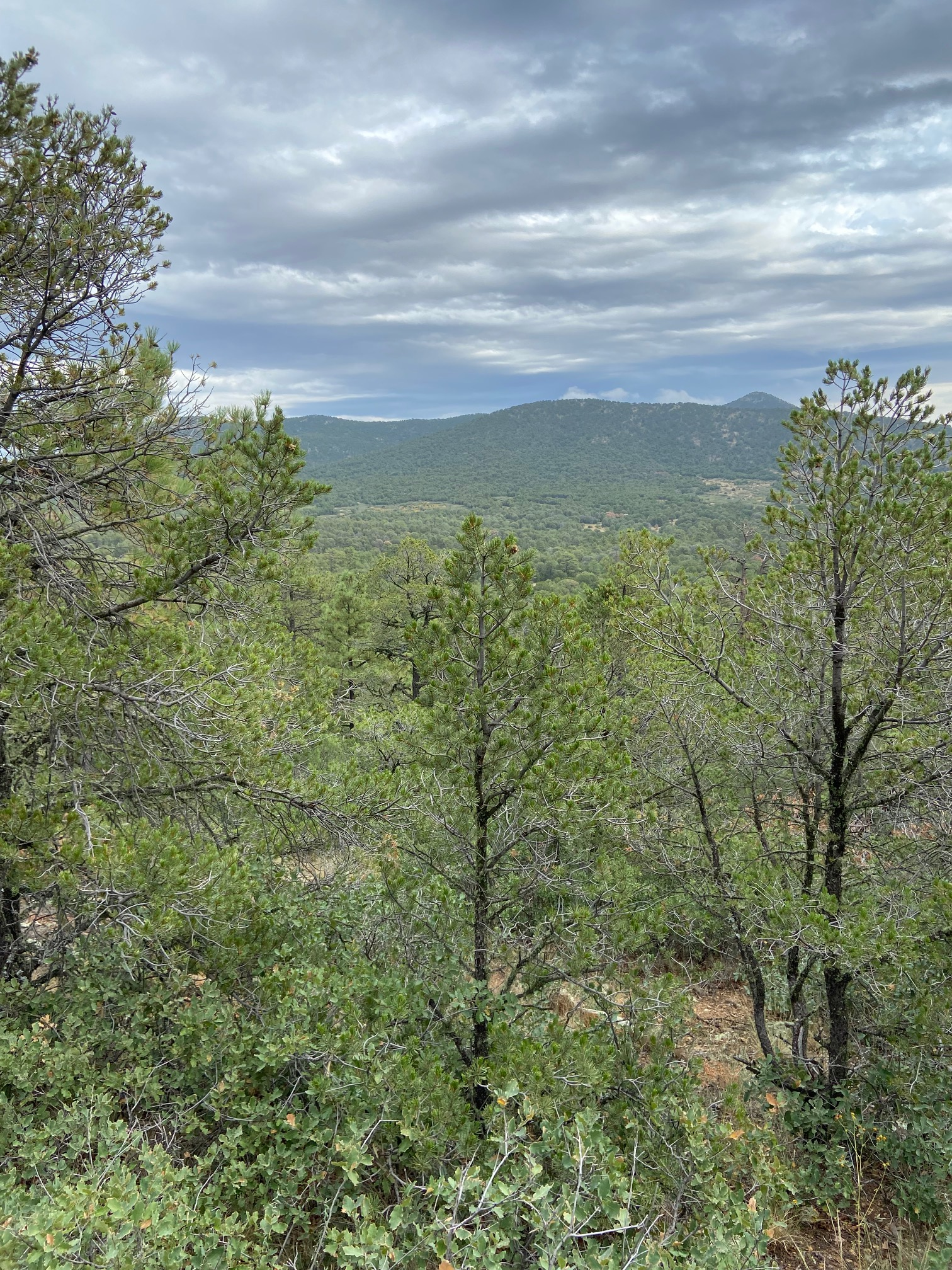
Jicarilla Mountains, September 2024

In 1850 the first gold seekers began to arrive to the Jicarilla Mountains, but it would take time before the first mines were established by enterprising gentlemen, who had the machinery to put down wells, because it placed deposits and very rich quartz lodes and gold fields in the vicinity, which made mines very productive. Mines of the locality were much richer than the Black Hills and richer than any ever discovered in California, which induced emigrants to visit it and Apache Indians were removed to their reservation. On 26 May 1877 it was reported a gold strike.

Jicarilla and White Oaks are two towns that were abandoned when the mines were no longer profitable in the early 1900s.
