= Zapata, New Mexico =

Coordinates: 33°18′06″N 107°10′50″W

Zapata, sometimes called Zapato, or San Ignacio is a ghost town in Sierra County, New Mexico, United States. Its site was submerged by the Elephant Butte Reservoir some years after it had been abandoned.

== History ==
Zapata, also named San Ignacio in the 1880 census, began on January 4, 1869 with the recording of a land title to a parcel of land by Antonio José García. The parcel was 2,000 yards long by 600 yards wide running along on the west bank of the Rio Grande across from the east bank where the "Pass of Alamocito", led Fra Cristobal Range to the Jornada del Muerto desert through Reynolds Canyon and Flying Eagle Canyon. It was three miles south of the site of San Ygnacio de la Alamosa, abandoned in 1867.

The site had been abandoned and was in ruins by 1908 when it was surveyed. It was submerged under the Reservoir by 1916.

== See also ==
- List of ghost towns in New Mexico
