= Jicarilla Schoolhouse =

- U.S. National Register of Historic Places
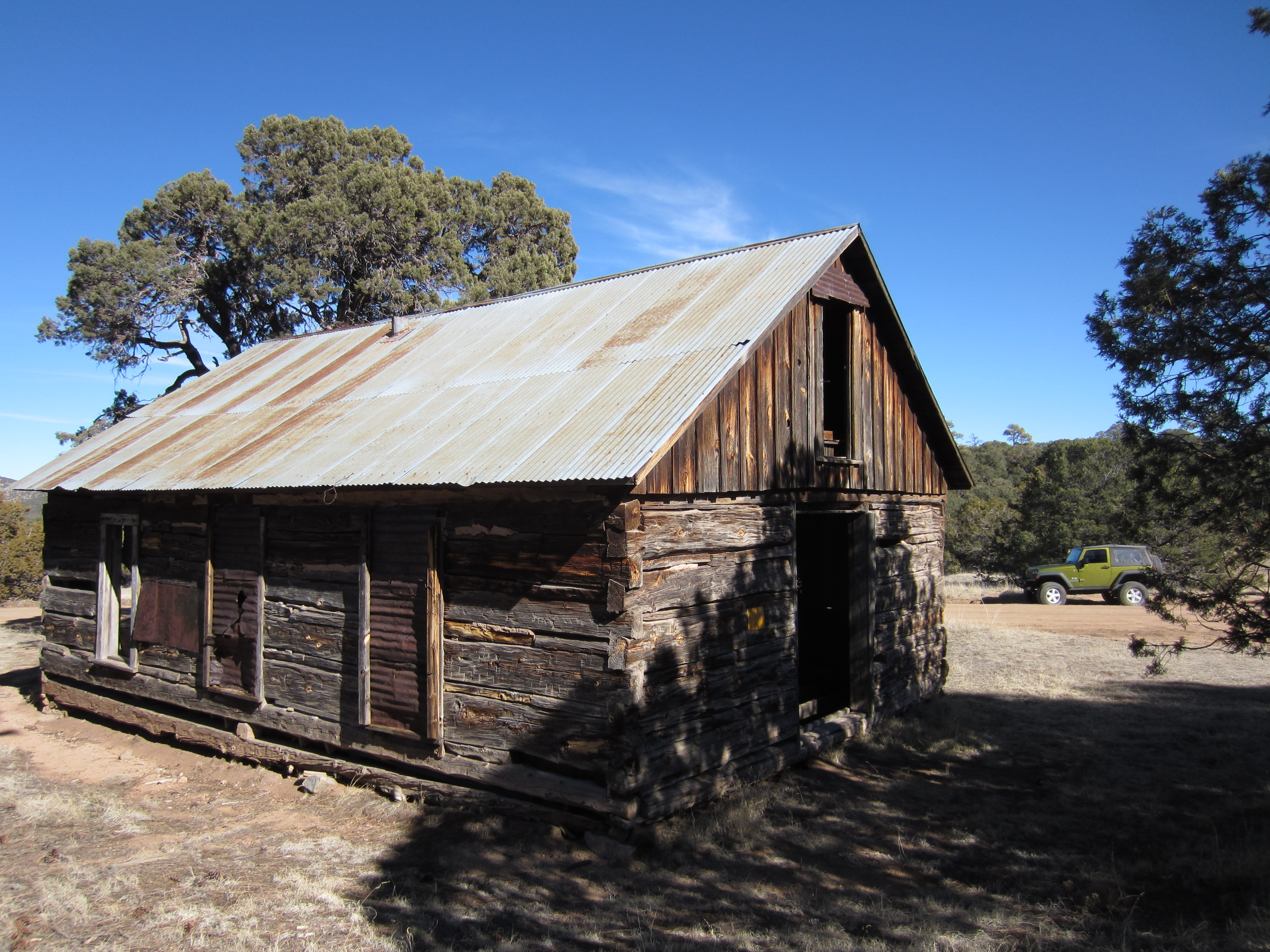

- Location within New Mexico
- Location: NM 349, Lincoln National Forest, Jicarilla, New Mexico
- Coordinates: 33°51′40″N 105°39′16″W
- Area: less than one acre
- Built: 1907
- Built by: Phillips Reasoner, Sr.
- NRHP reference No.: 83001623
- Added to NRHP: April 14, 1983

The Jicarilla Schoolhouse, in Jicarilla, New Mexico on New Mexico State Road 349 in Lincoln National Forest, was built in 1907. It was listed on the National Register of Historic Places in 1983.

A one-room schoolhouse built of squared pine logs, it was in its time the most substantial building in the Jicarilla Mountains and was the pride of its community of homesteaders.
