= Clairmont, New Mexico =

Clairmont
- Ghost town
- Location within the state of New Mexico Clairmont (the United States)
- Coordinates: 33°26′41″N 108°46′46″W
- Country: United States
- State: New Mexico
- County: Catron

Population (2000)
  - Total: 0
- Time zone: UTC-5 (Mountain (MST))
  - Summer (DST): MDT
- Area code: 575

Clairmont is a ghost town located 19 miles northeast of Glenwood in Catron County, New Mexico, United States.

== History ==
As early as 1822 the site is reported to have been a mining camp, surviving through the 1880s as a supply center for prospectors. It is located near Copper Creek, today there are old log cabins and a corral on the site. In 1883 the town had a post office. Clairmont is noted by historians as having been a significant mining community.
