= La Belle, New Mexico =

- Ghost town
- Location within New Mexico Location within the United States
- Coordinates: 36°45′46″N 105°18′02″W
- Country: United States
- State: New Mexico
- County: Taos

Population (2010)
  - Total: 0
- Time zone: UTC-7 (Mountain (MST))
  - Summer (DST): UTC-6 (MDT)
- Area code: 575

La Belle (also known as Labelle) is a ghost town in Taos County, New Mexico, United States. It is located approximately eight miles northeast of Red River.

== History ==
Minerals had been discovered in the area in 1866, but settlement did not occur until several decades later. The town was established as a mining camp and named after Belle Dixon, the wife of a prospector who was one of the first investors in the area, on August 28, 1894. By December, La Belle boasted 80 buildings, including three saloons, a hotel, a restaurant, a mercantile store, and butcher, blacksmith, and feed shops. In March 1895, the population reached 700 inhabitants, and there was a demand for a schoolhouse, which was completed by July. The La Belle Cresset newspaper was published in the town. At its peak, three hotels operated in La Belle: the Southern Hotel, a four-story 80-room structure that was moved from Catskill; the Exchange Hotel, a 14-room structure operated by Mr. and Mrs. Nadock that later became known as the Nadock Hotel; and a third building. The Nadock Hotel served as an official stagecoach stop for newcomers. A post office was established in 1895, as was the jail, which was reported never to hold anyone.

Prostitution flourished in La Belle during its brief existence. There was a small red-light district, and women often worked out of the second floor of saloons. In July 1895, the two Hagen brothers brought some girls in from Colorado Springs and opened a brothel.

The notorious outlaw Black Jack Ketchum and his brother Sam had a nearby ranch and were known to visit La Belle. The Ketchum brothers attended dances at the Nadock Hotel, and their partner was frequently Annie Nadock, daughter of the proprietors. Black Jack Ketchum was captured and convicted of killing Sheriff Edward Farr after a train robbery in 1899. On April 26, 1901, he was hanged in Clayton. According to legend, Ketchum buried several thousand dollars of treasure near La Belle, which has never been discovered.

La Belle became infamous for the promotion of its gold mine reserves, whose value was severely overstated at the time through deceptive photographs and advertising materials.

La Belle declined precipitously in the early 1900s; the gold mine was ultimately a disappointment because the ore was found to be low-grade. The post office closed in 1901. By 1910, the population had fallen to 10, and soon thereafter to zero. One of the only remaining buildings in La Belle is the La Belle Lodge, which was constructed in the 1950s or 1960s perhaps, long after the town's heyday.

== In media ==
A fictionalized version of La Belle served as the setting of the 2017 Netflix series Godless. In the series, 83 men were killed in a mining accident, which was based on other mining disasters but never actually took place in La Belle.

The infamous outlaw Black Jack Ketchum was captured in La Belle in 1899 and later hanged.
