= Tyrone (ghost town), New Mexico =

Coordinates: 32°38′30.5″N 108°19′31.5″W

Tyrone
- Ghost town
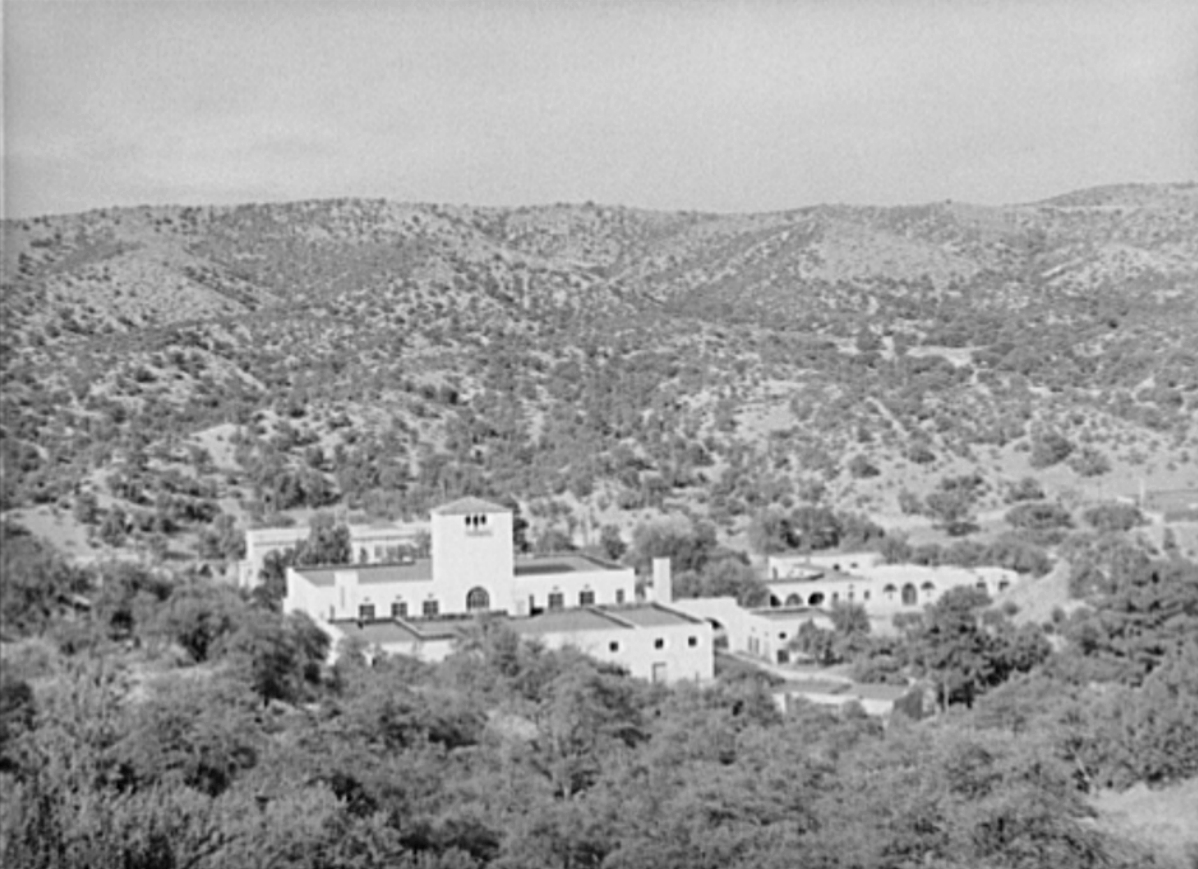
- Tyrone, New Mexico (May 1940).

- Location within New Mexico
- Country: United States
- State: New Mexico
- County: Grant
- Established: 1915
- Founder: Phelps Dodge Corporation

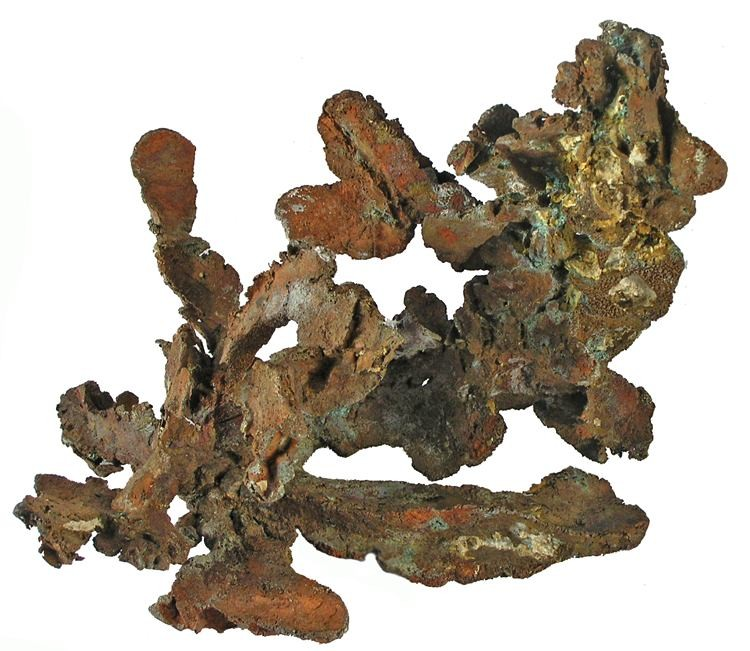
Native Copper specimen from the Tyrone Mine

Tyrone is a ghost town located in Grant County, New Mexico, United States, in the southwestern part of the state.

== Description ==
Tyrone was an elaborately planned community financed by the Phelps Dodge Corporation, based on Mediterranean and European styles, designed by well-known architect Bertram Goodhue and built in 1915 at a cost of more than a million dollars. A drop in copper prices in 1921 closed the mines and the town was deserted. The townsite was later destroyed as part of Phelps Dodge's development of the Tyrone open-pit copper mine, which began operation in 1969.

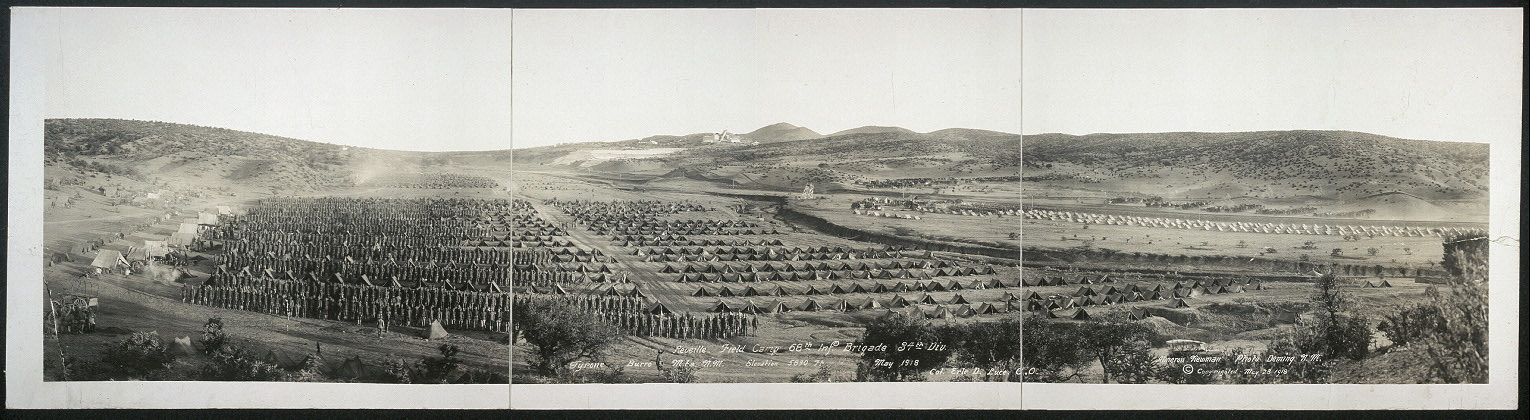
Field camp of the 68th Infantry Brigade, 34th Division in Tyrone, NM (May 1918).

== See also ==
- List of ghost towns in New Mexico

== Bibliography ==
- Haggard, C.J., "Reading the landscape: Phelps Dodge's Tyrone, New Mexico, in time and space {mining company town}," Journal of the West. 35:4, 29–39.
