= Milligan Gulch =

Valley in Socorro County, New Mexico

Milligan Gulch, originally known as La Cañada de la Cruz, or Red Canyon, is a valley in Socorro County New Mexico. Its mouth is its confluence with the Rio Grande at an elevation of 4,459 feet (1,359 meters). Its head is at 34°03′14″N 107°24′08″W at an elevation of 7,122 feet (2,171 meters) in the southernmost foothills of the Gallinas Mountains.
