= Ernie Blake =

German-American military intelligence officer and ski area developer

- Born: Ernst Hermann Bloch; March 24, 1913; Frankfurt, Germany
- Died: January 14, 1989 (aged 75); Albuquerque, New Mexico, US
- Citizenship: Swiss, American
- Education: Lyceum Alpinum Zuoz
- Alma mater: University of Frankfurt
- Known for: founder of Taos Ski Valley, New Mexico
- Spouse: Rhoda Limburg
- Children: 3

Ernie Blake (March 24, 1913 – January 14, 1989), originally Ernst Hermann Bloch, was the German-American founder, together with his wife Rhoda, of Taos Ski Valley, New Mexico. He was born in Germany, grew up in Switzerland and went to university in Germany and Switzerland before emigrating to the US in 1938. He worked for US military intelligence during World War II, when he assisted in the interrogation of the leading Nazis Hermann Göring and Albert Speer. His code name was Ernie Blake, and after the war, he chose it as his real name.

Always a keen skier, he met his future wife Rhoda whilst skiing in Vermont, and followed her to Santa Fe, New Mexico, where she was studying art. He was helping to run other ski areas and flying a small plane between them, when he spotted what was to become Taos Ski Valley.

== Early life ==
Blake was born Ernst Hermann Bloch in Frankfurt, Germany, in 1913, the son of Jenny (née Guggenheim), a Swiss mother and Adolph, a German father, who was an industrialist, and produced the raw material used to make felt hats. Ernst was a keen skater, and his mother introduced him to skiing.

He grew up close to the Swiss ski resort of St Moritz, and went to boarding school at the Lyceum Alpinum Zuoz in Zuoz, followed by a degree in history at the University of Frankfurt.

== Emigration to the US and World War II ==
In 1938, he emigrated to the United States. During World War II, he became a lieutenant in the United States army in military intelligence. He served in the European theatre, where he assisted in the interrogation of the leading Nazis Hermann Göring and Albert Speer.Ernie Blake was his code name during the war, and afterwards he chose it as his real name.

== Ski career ==
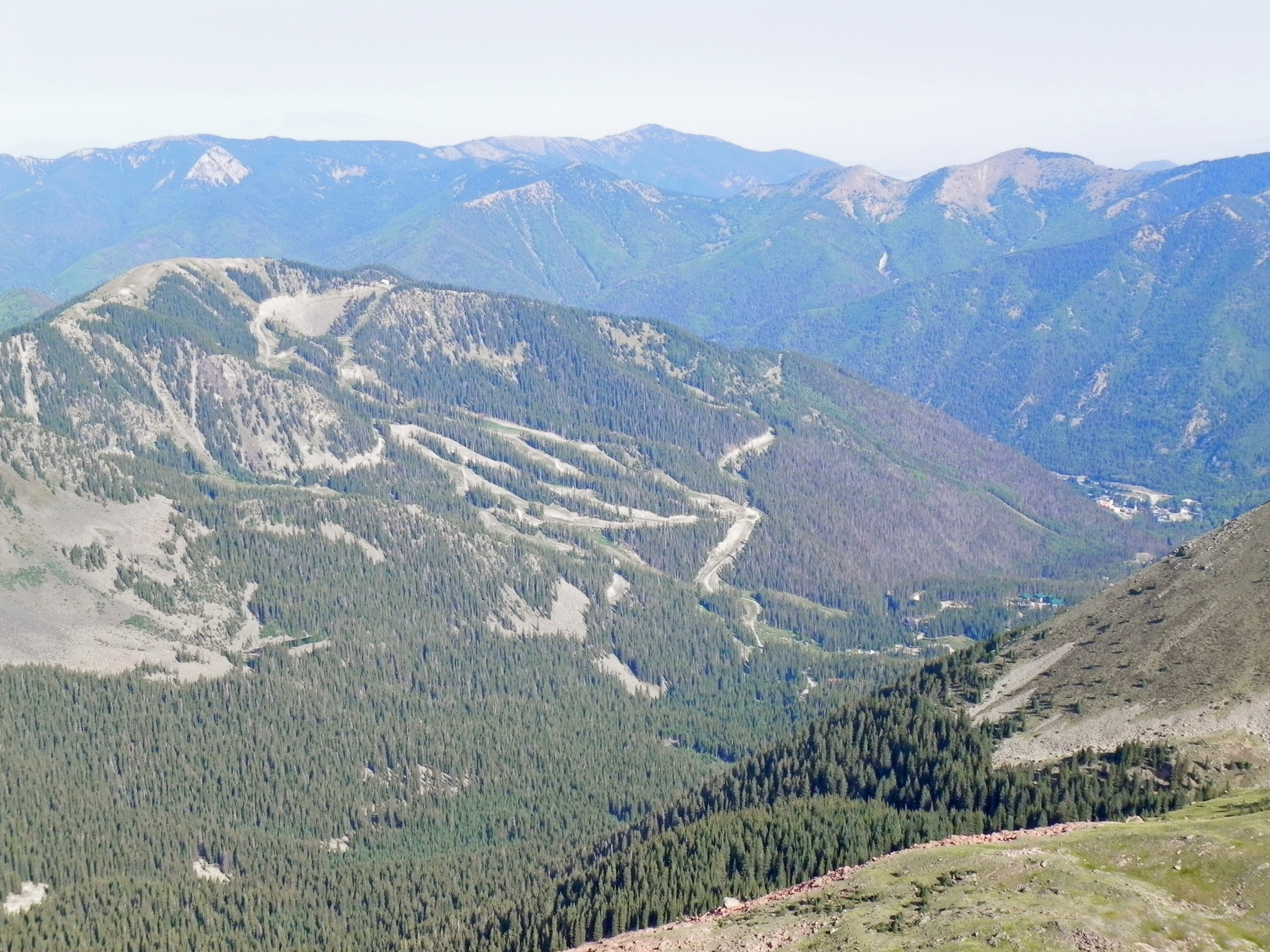
Taos Ski Valley

In December 1940 Blake met Rhoda Limburg at the top of a chairlift on Mount Mansfield in Stowe, Vermont. He followed her to Santa Fe, New Mexico, where she was studying art. They decided to marry in summer 1941. They had three children, Peter, Wendy and Mickey. By 1949, they had settled in Santa Fe. Blake was helping to run the Santa Fe ski area and the Glenwood Springs ski area in Colorado, traveling between them in a small plane he flew himself. As a result, he noticed the remote mountains 20 miles northeast of Taos and decided to start a ski area there. Blake was inducted into the US Ski Hall of Fame in 1987.

== Death ==
Blake died of pneumonia in Albuquerque on January 14, 1989.

== Legacy ==
In December 2013, the hedge fund billionaire Louis Bacon purchased Taos Ski Valley from the Blake family.
