= Anaconda, New Mexico =

Ghost town in New Mexico, United States

Coordinates: 35.252°N 107.947°W

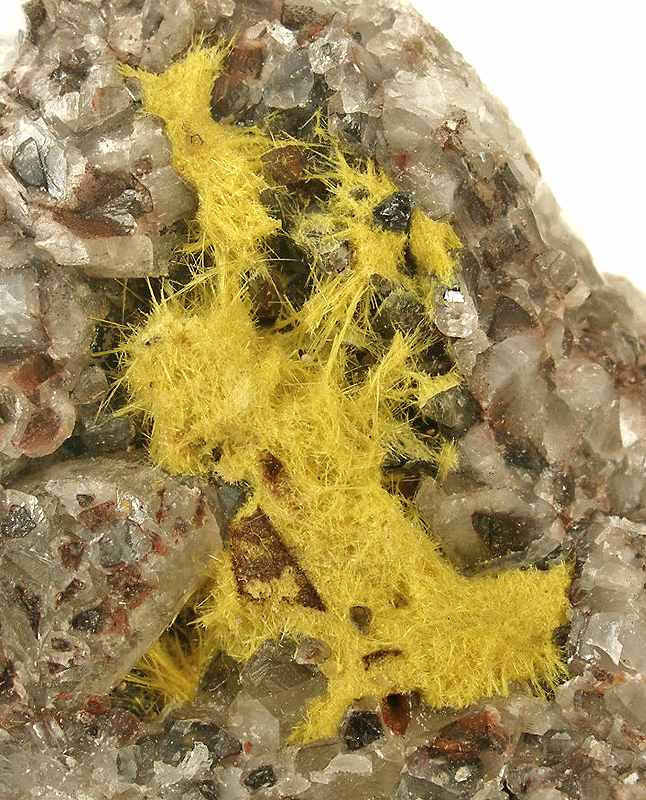
Uranophane on calcite, mineral specimen from the historic Jackpile mine.

Anaconda was a small mining community in Cibola County, New Mexico. The town came into existence in the early 1950s when the Anaconda Copper Company of Butte, Montana opened up a uranium ore processing plant 10 miles (16 km) northwest of Grants, along Route 66, to process ore from the Jackpile Mine (or Jackpile-Paguate Mine), then the world's largest open-pit uranium mine. Anaconda was the site of somewhere around 100 homes for the supervisors and management of the company. The Mill was also located on the same property. Contrary to reports, none of the homes were built using "radioactive" material from the plant. Referred to by the residents as "Camp", a carryover from the original tents used as temporary housing during the initial establishment of the operations. The housing was built in three phases. The first group of about 35 houses was constructed of cinderblock walls and had exposed beam ceilings. A building with four efficiency type apartments was included and used to house unmarried employees and was known as the Bachelors Quarters, or simply "The BQ". The two subsequent groups of approximately the same number were wood frame construction with stucco exteriors. The groups came to be called by the order of their building. Old Camp, Middle Camp and New Camp The Mill closed in early 1980s and the houses were sold and removed and the land reclaimed during the next 20 years. Testimony given before the New Mexico Legislature's Economic and Rural Development Committee in 2008 claimed that the mill had polluted local aquifers. Presently there is little to show that the area was once a community.

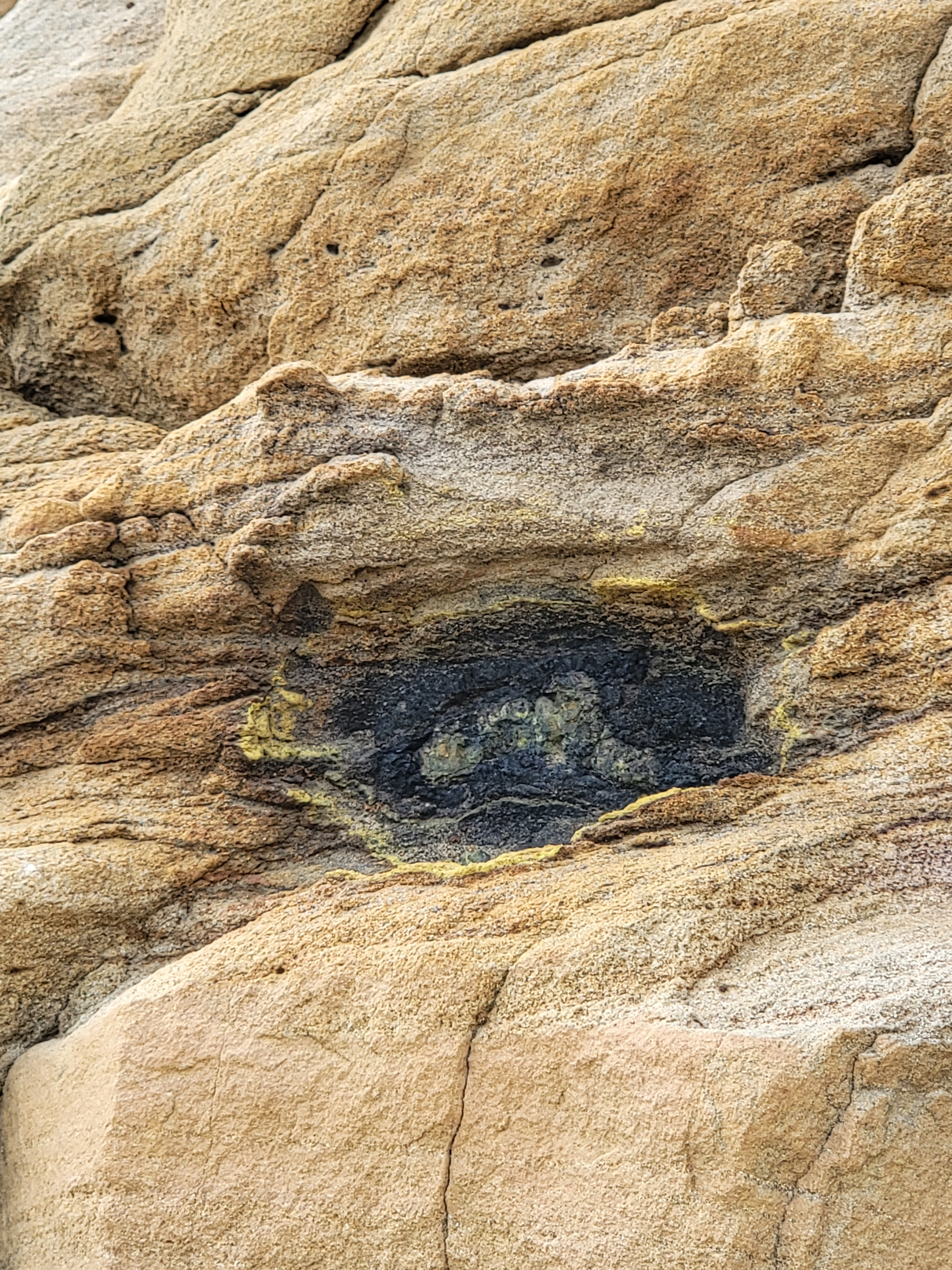
Uranium ore deposit in Jackpile-Paguate Mine.

During the time that Old Camp was built the Company also a built a clinic to serve the employees and their families. But as the only medical facility between Albuquerque and Gallup, it proved to be a blessing to the surrounding area as well. Dr. Basil Wang presided over the well-equipped multi-bed hospital and was so busy that, a second doctor was added for a time. Eventually, Anaconda employees spearheaded a drive that built the Cibola Hospital in Grants. The Anaconda Clinic building was later converted to general use and contained various departments including the Geology department during later years. A Quonset hut was added that served a number of purposes and was the community center for the camp. The floor was finished hardwood and used for basketball and volleyball, as well as rollerskating. A large kitchen in the back was used when the floor was turned into a meeting hall. Company and employee events here held here including a number of New Year's Eve celebrations.

Two additional buildings were added next to the Quonset Hut that housed a 20 yd (18.3 m) swimming pool and a four lane bowling alley. The swimming pool building was insulated with blown styrofoam on the inside. In the mid 1970s the pool building was replaced. Two outdoor tennis courts were added in the late 1950s. A golf course was added when the latter housing additions were built. There was no grass the course was periodically mainted with a grader to keep the "rough" from reclaiming the fairways. The greens were piles of oiled sand levelled on top and approximately 15 feet (4.6 meters) across. A "rake" was used to smooth the green for putting.

Beyond a pre-school held in the Quonset Hut, there were no schools. Students attended Elementary School in Bluewater Village several miles away. Junior High and High School students were bused to Grants. No store or Post Office was ever established on Company Property.

== Jackpile-Paguate mine ==
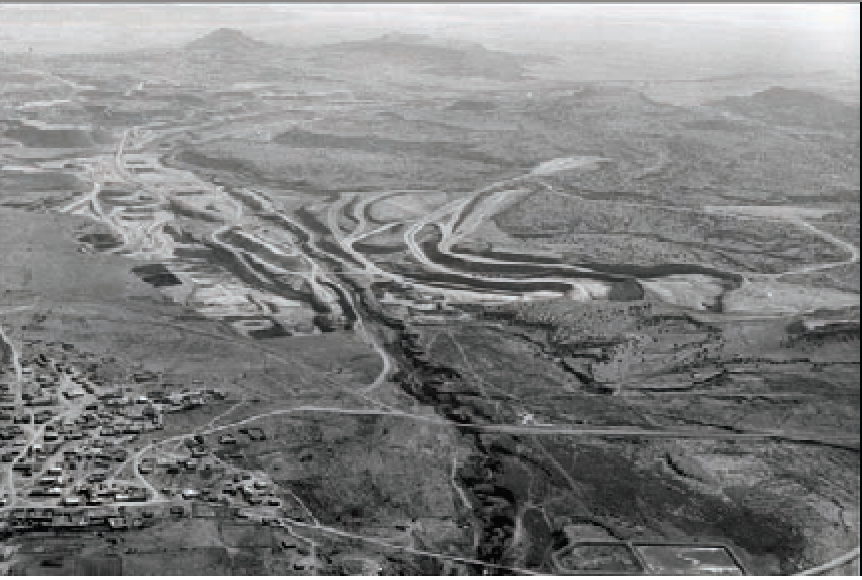
Jackpile Mine aerial, pre-1982

The Jackpile uranium mine opened in 1953 and operated until 1982. The Jackpile was one of the largest uranium mines ever developed and mined in the United States, and by far the largest mine in the Laguna uranium district. The ores of the Laguna district contain uranium, vanadium, and many other elements. Only rarely do the ores contain more than 1% uranium or vanadium; most of the ores ·average about 0.2% uranium and less vanadium. The first 3 million tons of ore shipped from the mine averaged 0.23% U_{3}O_{8} and 0.13% V_{2}O_{5} (1958 data). The ore bodies are typical "roll-front" deposits, localized in old stream channels. Carboniferous material within the ore zones is often high-grade.

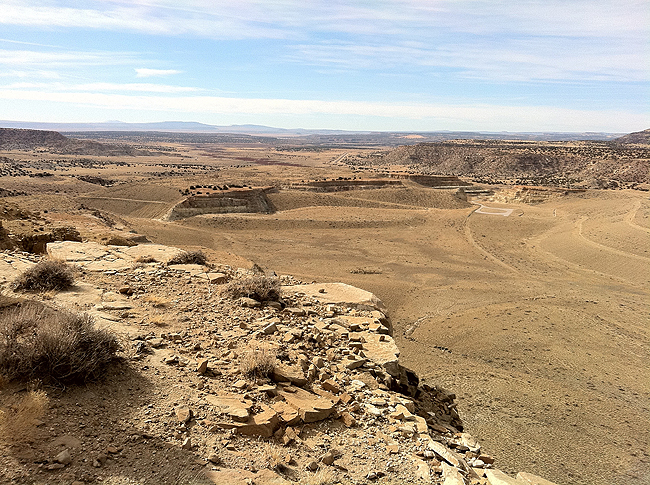
Reclaimed Jackpile-Paguate Uranium Mine, circa 2013

== See also ==
- List of ghost towns in New Mexico
- Uranium mining in New Mexico
