= Bennett Freeze =

Development ban of Navajo lands by the US Federal Government

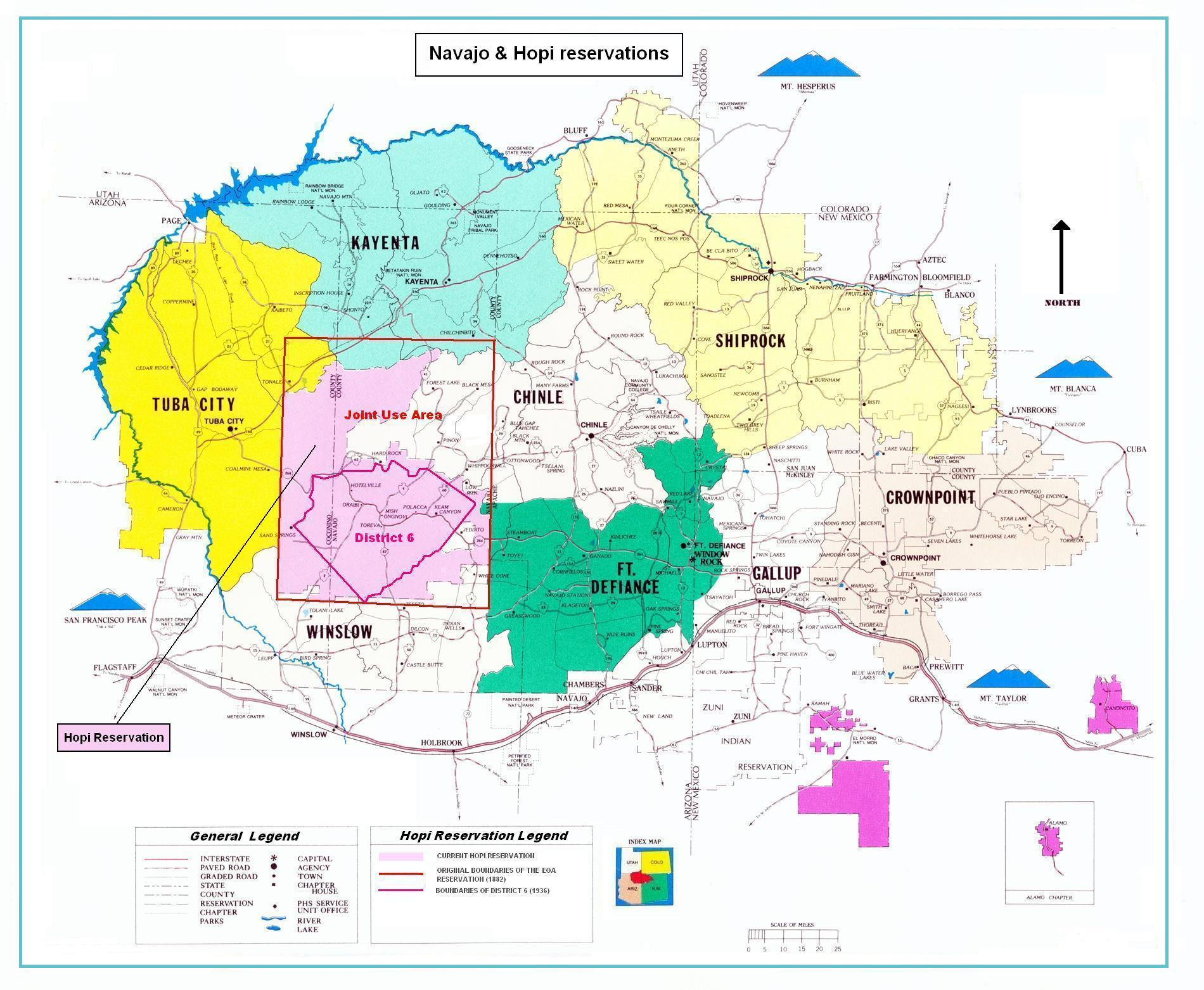
Map of the Hopi and Navajo reservation lands,, showing 1882 boundaries, 1936 District 6, and the 1962 Joint Use Area.

The Bennett Freeze was a 43-year development ban on 1.5 million acres (610,000 ha) of Navajo lands by the US Federal Government. It was put in place in 1966 in order to promote negotiations over a land dispute between the Navajo and the Hopi and lasted until 2009. It was named for the Commissioner of Indian Affairs at the time, Robert L Bennett, and meant that in the "frozen" area, no development at all could occur. This included fixing roofs, building houses, constructing gas and water lines, and repairing roads.

== Creation of the Navajo and Hopi Reservations ==
The Bennett Freeze has its origins in the treaty of Bear Springs and Treaty of 1868 that established a reservation for many Navajo. This was the result when the Navajo tribe was at war with the US army. As part of this conflict The Kit Carson Campaign sought to end traditional Navajo way of life through a scorched earth policy. Unable to live on their land, many were forced on the Long Walk of the Navajo to internment at Fort Sumner in New Mexico.

In 1868, the Navajo signed a treaty with the US government which established a reservation. The initial boundaries were in part of their traditional land base. Other areas were added to the reservation through executive action by various presidents in the late 1800s and early 1900s.

In 1882, President Chester A. Arthur created an area of land designated for the Hopi tribe and other tribes the Secretary of the Interior might settle on Hopi lands. It was decided the Hopi allotment would be a rectangle framed by lines of latitude and longitude, exactly one degree by one degree, and it left out the significant Hopi village of Moenkopi. It also included areas used by Navajos.

Despite the legal uncertainties of property ownership in the overlapping portions of Hopi and Navajo land, the two tribes co-existed without incident for many decades to come. The sparsely populated nature of the land in dispute and the differing traditional ways of life of the two tribes kept resource conflicts to a minimum.

== The History of the Bennett Freeze ==
As a result of a 1966 Hopi-Navajo Land Claims case, the then-Commissioner of Indian Affairs Robert L. Bennett created a development ban for Navajo living in the former Joint Use Area. The intent was to reduce tensions by essentially forcing Navajo families to leave the area. However, Navajo continued to reside in the contested area.

=== Mineral Rights ===
The land that makes up the Navajo Reservation contains rich deposits of coal and uranium. Generally considered barren rangeland at the time of its creation, the subterranean mineral richness of the area was not fully known or appreciated when the Navajo Reservation was first allotted by the US government, nor when it established the Hopi Reservation.

In 1919, a mining consortium became interested in the coal potential of the western portion of the Navajo Nation. The uncertain nature of land ownership and the rights associated with it became a major issue for the Hopi, Navajo and private mining interests. Competition for the land continued, especially over large coal-containing areas under Black Mesa.

As part of World War II and the Cold War, uranium was mined on both Navajo land and later in the Joint Use Area.

=== Joint Use Area ===
In 1962, the Supreme Court ruled in Healing v. Jones that there should be a "Joint Use Area" for both tribes, but tensions continued. The Freeze was intended to be a temporary measure to make the two tribes negotiate over the land, but an agreement was never reached. Under it, Hopi and Navajo would have to "agree upon any proposed economic activity in the area prior to undertaking that activity". This meant the start of many hardships for the thousands of Navajos and Hopi affected because the freeze essentially halted all economic development in the area. Additionally, there was constant conflict revolving around access to sacred sites.

In 1966 the coal company Peabody Coal started mining on Black Mesa.

=== Changes in the Joint Use Area ===
In 1972, Assistant Secretary Interior Harrison Loesch tried to decrease the severity of the situation by "unfreezing" some of the areas. However, because these areas were primarily Hopi and therefore hardly any more Hopi territory was affected by the Freeze, the Hopi essentially had unilateral veto power for proposed projects. Recognizing this problem, the Commissioner of Indian Affairs Morris Thomson gave his office the authority to override any improvement requests that the Hopi had rejected in 1976. The Navajo-Hopi Land Settlement Act of 1974 was a further attempt to reduce tensions by forcing Hopis off of lands reserved for Navajos and vice versa. Under this act, 6,000 Navajos had to leave their homes and once again, tensions were not reduced. Some claim that the primary beneficiary of this act were actually coal companies, specifically Peabody Coal, who would gain land access. They also posit that the conflict between the Hopi and Navajo was greatly exaggerated precisely to gain access to these resources.

In 1980, the US government tried to intervene again. However, as the government itself admitted in Senate Report 100-462, "the result [of past US actions] has been that the Native Americans living in the Bennett Freeze region reside in conditions that have not changed since 1966 and need to be improved".

In 2005, Senator John McCain (R-Arizona) introduced Senate Bill 1003: Navajo-Hopi Land Settlements of 2005. The bill passed the senate and included provisions such as amendments to the "Joint Use Area" established in 1880.

In 2009, the development ban was lifted by President Obama.

In 2010, Representative Ann Kirkpatrick (D-Arizona) introduced legislation to allocate more funds to the former Bennett Freeze area, but the bill has not passed.

== Bennett Freeze impact ==
The ban, which lasted 40 years, affected the lives of nearly 10,000 Navajo people who lived in the affected area. Now, around 20,000 people live in the formerly frozen area. Although the development freeze has been lifted since 2009, people in the area continue to suffer. Only 24% of the houses in the area are habitable, almost 60% do not have electricity, and the majority do not have access to potable running water. The legacy of the Bennett Freeze still looms over the region and deeply affects the day-to-day lives of its residents. In testimony before Congress, Nelson Gorman, Jr., Speaker of the Navajo Nation Council, likened it to "the deplorable conditions approximating those found only in underdeveloped third world countries.

With the advent of the Atomic Age in the 1940s and the subsequent onset of the Cold War, uranium mining on the Navajo Nation began. Miners from the region suffered adverse health impacts, and there is measured contamination in local infrastructure, including water sources, whose impact is unknown. The mine extracted as much as 1.3 billion gallons of water from the Navajo aquifer annually, and an estimated 45 billion gallons in Black Mesa's life cycle.
