= Taos Ski Valley, New Mexico =

Village in Taos County, New Mexico, United States

Taos Ski Valley
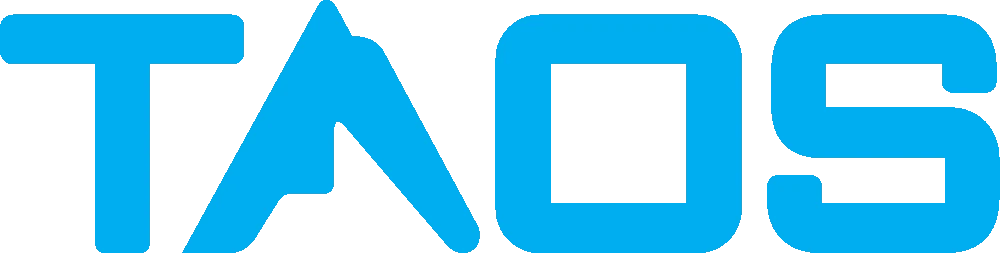

- Location in New Mexico Taos Ski Valley (the United States)
- Location: Taos County, New Mexico, U.S.
- Nearest city: Taos; 19 miles (31 km); Santa Fe; 89 miles (143 km); Albuquerque; 152 miles (245 km)
- Coordinates: 36.59000°N 105.43694°W
- Owner: Louis Bacon (Taos Ski Valley, Inc.)
- Vertical: 3,281 ft (1,000 m)
- Top elevation: 12,481 ft (3,804 m)
- Base elevation: 9,200 ft (2,804 m)
- Skiable area: 1,294 acres (5.2 km^{2})
- Trails: 110: 24% beginner; 25% intermediate; 51% advanced/expert
- Longest run: 5 mi (8 km)
- Lift system: 14 lifts: 1 gondola lift; 4 quads; 4 triples; 1 double; 4 surface lifts
- Lift capacity: 22,500 / hour
- Terrain parks: 2
- Snowfall: 300 in (760 cm)
- Snowmaking: 647 acres (2.6 km^{2})
- Night skiing: No
- Website: www.vtsv.org

Taos Ski Valley is a village and alpine ski resort in the southwestern United States, located in Taos County, New Mexico. As of the 2020 census, Taos Ski Valley had a population of 77. Until March 19, 2008, it was one of four ski resorts in America to prohibit snowboarding. The Kachina lift, constructed in 2014, serves one of the highest elevations of any triple chair in North America, to a peak of 12,481 feet (3,804 m) above sea level.

== History ==
In the 1800s, present-day Taos Ski Valley was the site of a small copper mining town called Twining, New Mexico, which was later abandoned. In 1955, Ernie and Rhoda Blake founded the area as a ski mountain.

The first ski lift, a J-bar, was installed in 1956. Until 1957, the ski resort featured only one ski slope, Snakedance. In 1957, the resort installed a second lift—a Poma (platter) lift.

The Blakes lived in an eleven-foot camper in the absence of any buildings in the area except the almost-completed Hondo Lodge (now Snakedance Condominiums). Even after moving into the lodge, they lived without power until 1963. Ernie and Rhoda had been living in Santa Fe, New Mexico, where Ernie managed the Santa Fe Ski Basin. Ernie was for a time involved in the day-to-day management of the Taos resort, answering the phone and telling prospective visitors whether the skiing was expected to be good in advance of weekend trips. The village was incorporated in 1996.

In 2006, Taos Ski Valley had 110 trails with 24% beginner, 25% intermediate, and 51% advanced/expert. It was home to the Ernie Blake Snowsports School, one of the highest rated ski schools in North America.

In December 2013, the Blake family sold Taos Ski Valley, Inc. to billionaire conservationist Louis Bacon.

In 2018, Taos Ski Valley started Taos Air, a virtual airline which operated scheduled public air charter service at Taos Regional Airport during ski season. Summer flights were added in 2021. Taos Air ceased using its own brand identity in December 2022 when flight operations were transferred to JSX, and it effectively terminated operations permanently in April 2024 when Taos Ski Valley allowed its airline service contract with the town of Taos to expire.

== Geography ==
According to the United States Census Bureau, the village has a total area of 2.4 square miles (6.2 km^{2}), all land.

Taos Ski Valley is one of the highest municipalities in the US, sited at an elevation of 9,321 feet (2,841 m); however, the village limits reach 12,581 feet (3,835 m) and the highest residential dwelling is at 10,350 feet (3,155 m). Kachina Village, also at over 10,350 feet, houses Bavarian Restaurant and two condo complexes and accommodates six permanent residents and visitors in 30 condo units; 70–80 home sites are planned for development. Wheeler Peak, the tallest mountain in New Mexico at 13,161 feet (4,011 m), overlooks the village.

The village is completely surrounded by Carson National Forest, including bordering designated wilderness.

=== Climate ===
Taos Ski Valley receives around 300 inches (760 cm) of snow a year. Taos Powderhorn is a SNOTEL weather station situated in the Taos Valley ski resort, near Kachina peak, at an elevation of 11,057 feet (3,370 m). Taos Powderhorn has a subalpine climate (Köppen Dsc).

Climate data for Taos Powderhorn, New Mexico, 2011–2020 normals: 11,057 ft (3,370 m)
Month	Jan	Feb	Mar	Apr	May	Jun	Jul	Aug	Sep	Oct	Nov	Dec	Year
Mean daily maximum °F (°C)	28.9 (−1.7)	29.4 (−1.4)	37.2 (2.9)	42.1 (5.6)	50.0 (10.0)	63.5 (17.5)	64.6 (18.1)	62.4 (16.9)	56.6 (13.7)	46.1 (7.8)	36.2 (2.3)	28.5 (−1.9)	45.5 (7.5)
Daily mean °F (°C)	22.5 (−5.3)	22.7 (−5.2)	29.6 (−1.3)	34.3 (1.3)	41.7 (5.4)	54.2 (12.3)	56.1 (13.4)	54.4 (12.4)	49.2 (9.6)	39.5 (4.2)	29.9 (−1.2)	22.3 (−5.4)	38.0 (3.4)
Mean daily minimum °F (°C)	16.1 (−8.8)	16.0 (−8.9)	22.0 (−5.6)	26.5 (−3.1)	33.4 (0.8)	44.9 (7.2)	47.7 (8.7)	46.4 (8.0)	41.8 (5.4)	32.9 (0.5)	23.7 (−4.6)	16.2 (−8.8)	30.6 (−0.8)
Average precipitation inches (mm)	3.09 (78)	3.78 (96)	4.07 (103)	4.10 (104)	2.28 (58)	0.82 (21)	2.85 (72)	3.09 (78)	3.36 (85)	3.74 (95)	3.22 (82)	3.81 (97)	38.21 (969)
Average snowfall inches (cm)	56.0 (142)	73.6 (187)	68.8 (175)	12.8 (33)	6.3 (16)	0.9 (2.3)	0.0 (0.0)	0.0 (0.0)	0.0 (0.0)	7.0 (18)	22.2 (56)	60.8 (154)	308.4 (783.3)
Source 1: XMACIS2
Source 2: NOAA (Precipitation)

== Economy ==
Tourism is the village's main industry. As of the 2011–2012 season Taos Ski Valley Corporation employed approximately 700 people during winter months. In an average year $47 million are spent in the local economy of Taos Ski Valley. About $12 million is from ski operations alone. The community is a popular summer and fall vacation destination. In 2005, 55 businesses operated in Taos Ski Valley. Lodging options include hotels, private home rentals, condominiums and alpine styled bed and breakfasts. The town of Taos, located 30 minutes drive down the canyon, provides year-round services.

== Demographics ==
Historical population
Census	Pop.	Note	%±
2000	56		—
2010	69		23.2%
2020	77		11.6%
U.S. Decennial Census

As of the 2010 census, the Village held 69 people and 272 housing units, with only 14.3% occupied. From 2000 to 2010 population increased 23.2%. The population density was 28.75 inhabitants per square mile (11.10/km^{2}). The racial makeup was 75.4% White and 24.6% Hispanic or Latino.

In 2000, 12.5% of 32 households had children under the age of 18 living with them, 37.5% were married couples living together, while 59.4% were non-families. 46.9% of all households were made up of individuals, and 3.1% had someone living alone who was 65 years of age or older. The average household size was 1.75 and the average family size was 2.46.

Only 4.3% were under age 18, 5.4% from 18 to 24, 33.9% from 25 to 44, 50.0% from 45 to 64, and 1.8% who were 65 years or older. The median age was 47 years. For every 100 females, there were 166.7 males. The ratio of males to females was 1.66.

The median household income was $67,708, and the median income for a family was $103,422. Males had a median income of $65,833 versus $24,375 for females. The per capita income for the village was $43,143. None of the population were below the poverty line.

== Education ==
Almost all of the CDP is within Taos Municipal Schools, with a very small remainder in Questa Independent Schools. The former operates Taos High School.

== See also ==
- List of municipalities in New Mexico
