= Mary Jo =

Mary Jo, various spelled Mari Jo, Mary Joe and similar, is a feminine double given name found mainly in the United States. It is often a contraction of Mary Josephine, Mary Joanna or similar.

Notable people with the name include:

- Mary Jo Arndt (1933–2011), American activist and civic leader
- Mary Jo Baedecker (born 1941), American geochemist
- Mary Jo Bane, American political scientist
- Mary Jo Bang (born 1946), American poet
- Mary Jo Bona, American literary scholar
- Mary Jo Bole (born 1956), American artist
- Mari Jo Buhle (born 1943), American historian
- Mary Jo Buttafuoco (born 1955), American author and motivational speaker
- Mary Jo Catlett (born 1938), American actress
- Mary Jo Chelette (1939–1984), American country singer
- Mary Jo Codey (born 1955), American healthcare activist
- Maryjo Cohen (born 1952), American business executive
- Mary Jo Daley (born 1949), American politician
- Mary Jo Deschanel (born 1945), American actress
- Mary Jo Duffy (born 1954), American comic book editor and writer
- Mary Jo Estep (1909 or 1910—1992), Shoshone massacre survivor
- Mary Jo Eustace (born 1962), Canadian actress and chef
- Mary Joe Fernández (born 1971), American tennis player
- Mary Jo Fisher (born 1962), Australian politician
- Mary Jo Foley, American writer
- Mary Jo Freshley (born 1934), American Korean dance instructor
- Mary Joe Frug (1941–1991), American legal scholar
- Mary Jo Haddad, Canadian nurse and health care executive
- Mary Jo Heath (born 1954), American radio music host
- Mary Jo Keenen (born 1961), American actress
- Mary Jo Kilroy (born 1949), American attorney and politician
- Mary Jo Kopechne (1940–1969), American secretary
- Mary Jo Leddy, (born 1946), Canadian writer and activist
- Mary Jo Markey, American television and film editor
- Mary Jo McGuire (born 1956), American politician
- MariJo Moore, American writer
- Mary-Jo Morell (1937–2025), nom de plume of German writer Doris Gercke
- Mary Jo Nye (born 1944), American historian of science
- Mary Jo Ondrechen (born 1953), American chemist
- Mary Jo Pehl (born 1960), American writer, actress, and comedian
- Mary Jo Peppler (born 1944), American volleyball player and coach
- Mary Jo Perino, American television sports journalist
- Mary Jo Podgurski, American healthcare educator
- Mary Jo Putney, American author
- Mary Jo Randle (born 1954), English actress
- Mari-Jo P. Ruiz, Filipina mathematician
- Mary Jo Salter (born 1954), American poet
- Mary Jo Sanders (born 1974), American boxer
- Mary Jo Shelly (1902–1976), American military administrator
- Mary Jo Slater (born 1946), American casting director and producer
- Mary-Jo Starr (born 1959), stage name of Australian actress, director, and singer Kaarin Fairfax
- Mary Jo Tarola (1928–2017), birth name of American model and actress Linda Douglas
- Mary Jo Taylor (born 1953), American politician
- Mary Jo Tiampo (born 1962), American freestyle skier
- Mary Jo Watson, Seminole art historian
- Mary Jo West (born 1948), American news anchor
- Mary Jo White (born 1947), American attorney and civil servant
- Mary Jo White (Pennsylvania politician) (born 1941), American state senator
- Mary Jo Wilhelm (born 1955), American politician
- Mary Jo Wills (born 1951), American diplomat
- Mary-Jo Wormell (born 1947), birth name of British writer Mary Lyons
- Mary Jo Young, American contestant on American Idol season 19

== Fictional characters ==
- Mari Jo Mason, in the US TV soap opera The Young and the Restless, played by Pamela Bach and Diana Barton
- Mary Jo Shively, in the US TV sitcom Designing Women, played by Annie Potts
