= Suthers =

Suthers is a surname. Notable people with the surname include:

- John Suthers (born 1951), American attorney and politician
- Marie H. Suthers (1895–1983), American politician and educator
- Robert Bentley Suthers (1871–?), British writer

== See also ==
- Suther
