= Kathryn Brush =

Canadian professor of visual arts

- Occupation: Art historian
- Spouse: John Shearman (m. 1998, d. 2003)

Academic background
- Education: B.A., Art History and German, McMaster University; M.A., PhD., Art History, Brown University
- Thesis: The West Choir Screen at Mainz Cathedral: Studies in Program, Patronage and Meaning (1987)

Academic work
- Discipline: Art history
- Institutions: University of Western Ontario
- Main interests: medieval art and architecture; history of museums and collecting; historiography

Kathryn Louise Brush FRSC is a Canadian art historian. She is Distinguished University Professor Emerita at the University of Western Ontario, and was the first professor in the Department of Visual Arts at the University of Western Ontario to be named a Fellow of the Royal Society of Canada.

== Education ==
Brush attended McMaster University while majoring in modern languages and literature. She spent two years studying in Canada before spending her third year in Europe at the University of Poitiers and the University of Göttingen. Following this, she changed her major to Art History and German for her Bachelor of Arts at McMaster University in 1978, and subsequently earned her MA (1982) and PhD (1987) in Art History at Brown University. Her dissertation under Kermit Champa there was titled "The West Choir Screen at Mainz Cathedral: Studies in Program, Patronage and Meaning."

== Career ==
After graduating from Brown University, Brush became the first woman hired for a full-time position in Art History at the University of Western Ontario in 1987. She earned research fellowships at Harvard University, Princeton University, and the Zentralinstitut für Kunstgeschichte in Munich. Her work has also been supported by the Social Sciences and Humanities Research Council of Canada (SSHRC) and the Alexander von Humboldt-Stiftung. In 1996 she published her first monograph, The Shaping of Art History: Wilhelm Vöge, Adolph Goldschmidt, and the Study of Medieval Art, which analyzed the work of two of the most influential German scholars of medieval visual culture during the years from 1885 to 1915, when art history was first institutionalized as a university discipline. In 2003, she published Vastly More than Brick and Mortar: Reinventing the Fogg Art Museum in the 1920s through Yale University Press, a book which described, in detail, the history of the Fogg Art Museum at Harvard University and its place in the development of formalized art study and museum practice in the US and the international domain.

In 2010, Brush was the curator for a SSHRC-funded exhibition on "Mapping Medievalism at the Canadian Frontier". The exhibition and accompanying essay volume explored the concept of "medieval" Canada, considering the technologies developed by Indigenous peoples before 1500, the medieval notion of "wilderness" grafted onto Canada's landscape by European colonists, and the medievalisms of Canada's iconic Group of Seven.

In 2013, Brush was awarded the university's Edward G. Pleva Award for Excellence in Teaching and was a candidate as a councillor of the Medieval Academy of America. Two years later, Brush was one of three professors from the University of Western Ontario named a Fellow of the Royal Society of Canada, and thus became the first Visual Arts professor from the university to be elected. In 2017, she was named a Distinguished University Professor and awarded the 2017 Hellmuth Prize for Achievement in Research. The following year she collaborated with Joanne Bloom to curate an exhibition at Harvard University's Fine Arts Library called "Camera Woman Along the Medieval Pilgrimage Roads" which focused on the early 20th-century photographer Lucy Wallace Porter (1876–1962). She is currently writing a book on the life and scholarly imagination of the legendary Harvard medievalist Arthur Kingsley Porter (1883–1933).

== Personal life ==
Brush was married in 1998 to John Shearman, professor of Italian Renaissance art at Harvard University, until his death in August 2003.

== Publications ==
The following is a list of publications:

- Artistic Integration in Gothic Buildings (co-editor) (1995)
- The Shaping of Art History: Wilhelm Vöge, Adolph Goldschmidt, and the Study of Medieval Art (1996)
- Vastly More than Brick and Mortar: Reinventing the Fogg Art Museum in the 1920s (2004)
- Mapping Medievalism at the Canadian Frontier (2010)
- Numerous articles in North American and European journals and essay volumes
