= 1938 United States elections =

- ← 1936 1937 1938 1939 1940 → Midterm elections
- Election day: November 8
- Incumbent president: ▌Franklin D. Roosevelt (D)
- Next Congress: 76th

Senate elections
- Overall control: Democratic hold
- Seats contested: 36 of 96 seats (32 Class 3 seats + 6 special elections)
- Net seat change: Republican +8
- 1938 Senate election results Democratic gain Democratic hold Republican gain Republican hold

House elections
- Overall control: Democratic hold
- Seats contested: All 435 voting seats
- Popular vote margin: Democratic +1.2%
- Net seat change: Republican +81
- 1938 House election results Democratic gain Democratic hold Republican gain Republican hold

Gubernatorial elections
- Seats contested: 33
- Net seat change: Republican +12
- 1938 gubernatorial election results Democratic gain Democratic hold Republican gain Republican hold

Elections were held on November 8, 1938, in the middle of Democratic President Franklin D. Roosevelt's second term. The Democratic Party lost 72 seats, mostly to the Republican Party, in the House of Representatives. The Democrats also lost eight seats to the Republicans in the U.S. Senate. Despite these heavy losses, the Democrats maintained control of Congress.

The election was a defeat for Roosevelt, as the conservative coalition (an alliance of Republicans and Southern Democrats) took control of Congress and stymied Roosevelt's domestic agenda. Roosevelt had campaigned openly against members of his own party who had not supported the New Deal, but Roosevelt's preferred candidates were met with little success across the country. The election took place in the aftermath of the Recession of 1937–1938 and the defeat of the Judicial Procedures Reform Bill of 1937 ("the court-packing plan"), and Roosevelt was at the nadir of his popularity. The Republicans picked up congressional seats for the first time since the start of the Great Depression, and few new major domestic programs became law until the advent of the Great Society in the 1960s.

== See also ==
- 1938 United States House of Representatives elections
- 1938 United States Senate elections
- 1938 United States gubernatorial elections
