= 1983 FIS Freestyle Ski World Cup =

Freestyle skiing competitive season

Freestyle Skiing World Cup 1983
| Discipline | Men | Women |
| Overall | (Canada) Peter Judge | (Switzerland) Conny Kissling |
| Moguls | (Canada) Bill Keenan | (United States) Hayley Wolff |
| Aerials | (Switzerland) Sandro Wirth | (Canada) Marie-Claude Asselin (3) |
| Ballet | (West Germany) Richard Schabl | (United States) Jan Bucher |
| Combined | (Canada) Alain Laroche | (Canada) Marie-Claude Asselin (3) |

Competition
| Locations | 7 | 7 |
| Individual | 25 | 25 |

The 1983 FIS Freestyle Skiing World Cup was the fourth World Cup season in freestyle skiing organised by International Ski Federation. The season started on 4 January 1983 and ended on 19 March 1983. This season included four disciplines: aerials, moguls, ballet and combined.

== Men ==
=== Ballet ===
| Num | Season | Date | Place | Event | Winner | Second | Third |
|---|---|---|---|---|---|---|---|
| 26 | 1 | 3 January 1983 | (Austria) Mariazell | AC | (West Germany) Richard Schabl | (West Germany) Hermann Reitberger | (West Germany) Ernst Garhammer |
| 27 | 2 | 20 January 1983 | (France) Tignes | AC | (West Germany) Richard Schabl | (West Germany) Hermann Reitberger | (West Germany) Ernst Garhammer |
| 28 | 3 | 29 January 1983 | (West Germany) Oberjoch | AC | (West Germany) Hermann Reitberger | (West Germany) Richard Schabl | (West Germany) Ernst Garhammer |
| 29 | 4 | 2 February 1983 | (Italy) Livigno | AC | (West Germany) Richard Schabl | (West Germany) Ernst Garhammer | (United States) Peter Judge |
| 30 | 5 | 12 February 1983 | (Italy) Ravascletto | AC | (West Germany) Richard Schabl | (France) Jacques Poillion | (West Germany) Hermann Reitberger |
| 31 | 6 | 11 March 1983 | (United States) Squaw Valley | AC | (West Germany) Hermann Reitberger | (West Germany) Richard Schabl | (Canada) Daniel Côté |
| 32 | 7 | 17 March 1983 | (United States) Angel Fire | AC | (West Germany) Hermann Reitberger | (West Germany) Richard Schabl | (West Germany) Ernst Garhammer |

=== Moguls ===
| Num | Season | Date | Place | Event | Winner | Second | Third |
|---|---|---|---|---|---|---|---|
| 25 | 1 | 4 January 1983 | (Austria) Mariazell | MO | (France) Philippe Deiber | (Sweden) Lasse Fahlén | (Canada) Bill Keenan |
| 26 | 2 | 19 January 1983 | (France) Tignes | MO | (Italy) Hans Schenk | (France) Philippe Deiber | (Sweden) Lasse Fahlén |
| 27 | 3 | 3 February 1983 | (Italy) Livigno | MO | (Canada) Bill Keenan | (Sweden) Stefan Engström | (Italy) Mauro Mottini |
| 28 | 4 | 5 February 1983 | (Italy) Livigno | MO | (Canada) Bill Keenan | (Italy) Mauro Mottini | (France) Philippe Deiber |
| 29 | 5 | 16 March 1983 | (United States) Angel Fire | MO | (Sweden) Stefan Engström | (United States) Cooper Schell | (Canada) Bill Keenan |
| 30 | 6 | 18 March 1983 | (United States) Angel Fire | MO | (Canada) Bill Keenan | (Sweden) Lasse Fahlén | (United States) Frank Beddor |

=== Aerials ===
| Num | Season | Date | Place | Event | Winner | Second | Third |
|---|---|---|---|---|---|---|---|
| 23 | 1 | 21 January 1983 | (France) Tignes | AE | (Switzerland) Sandro Wirth | (Canada) Jean Corriveau | (Canada) Yves LaRoche |
| 24 | 2 | 22 January 1983 | (France) Tignes | AE | (Switzerland) Sandro Wirth | (Canada) Craig Clow | (Canada) Jean Corriveau |
| 25 | 3 | 4 February 1983 | (Italy) Livigno | AE | (Switzerland) Sandro Wirth | (Canada) Jean Corriveau | (Canada) Yves LaRoche |
| 26 | 4 | 13 February 1983 | (Italy) Ravascletto | AE | (Canada) Alain Laroche | (Canada) Craig Clow | (Switzerland) Dani Nieth |
| 27 | 5 | 19 March 1983 | (United States) Angel Fire | AE | (United Kingdom) Mike Nemesvary | (Canada) Jean-Marc Rozon | (Canada) Craig Clow |
| 28 | 6 | 19 March 1983 | (United States) Angel Fire | AE | (Canada) Alain Laroche | (Canada) Jean-Marc Rozon | (United States) Frank Beddor |

=== Combined ===
| Num | Season | Date | Place | Event | Winner | Second | Third |
|---|---|---|---|---|---|---|---|
| 23 | 1 | 21 January 1983 | (France) Tignes | CO | (France) Eric Laboureix | (United Kingdom) Mike Nemesvary | (United States) Bruce Bolesky |
| 24 | 2 | 22 January 1983 | (France) Tignes | CO | (Canada) Peter Judge | (United States) Bruce Bolesky | (United Kingdom) Mike Nemesvary |
| 25 | 3 | 4 February 1983 | (Italy) Livigno | CO | (Canada) Alain Laroche | (Canada) Peter Judge | (France) Éric Laboureix |
| 26 | 4 | 13 February 1983 | (Italy) Ravascletto | CO | (Canada) Alain Laroche | (France) Éric Laboureix | (United States) Paul Rosenberg |
| 27 | 5 | 19 March 1983 | (United States) Angel Fire | CO | (Canada) Peter Judge | (United States) Frank Beddor | (United States) Bruce Bolesky |
| 28 | 6 | 19 March 1983 | (United States) Angel Fire | CO | (United States) Frank Beddor | (Canada) Alain LaRoche | (France) Éric Laboureix |

== Ladies ==
=== Ballet ===
| Num | Season | Date | Place | Event | Winner | Second | Third |
|---|---|---|---|---|---|---|---|
| 26 | 1 | 3 January 1983 | (Austria) Mariazell | AC | (United States) Jan Bucher | (France) Christine Rossi | (Switzerland) Conny Kissling |
| 27 | 2 | 20 January 1983 | (France) Tignes | AC | (United States) Jan Bucher | (France) Christine Rossi | (Switzerland) Conny Kissling |
| 28 | 3 | 29 January 1983 | (West Germany) Oberjoch | AC | (United States) Jan Bucher | (France) Christine Rossi | (Switzerland) Conny Kissling |
| 29 | 4 | 2 February 1983 | (Italy) Livigno | AC | (United States) Jan Bucher | (Switzerland) Conny Kissling | (Canada) Lucie Barma |
| 30 | 5 | 12 February 1983 | (Italy) Ravascletto | AC | (France) Christine Rossi | (United States) Jan Bucher | (Canada) Lucie Barma |
| 31 | 6 | 11 March 1983 | (United States) Squaw Valley | AC | (United States) Jan Bucher | (France) Christine Rossi | (Canada) Lucie Barma |
| 32 | 7 | 17 March 1983 | (United States) Angel Fire | AC | (United States) Jan Bucher | (United States) Karen Benker | (Switzerland) Conny Kissling |

=== Moguls ===
| Num | Season | Date | Place | Event | Winner | Second | Third |
|---|---|---|---|---|---|---|---|
| 25 | 1 | 4 January 1983 | (Austria) Mariazell | MO | (United States) Mary Jo Tiampo | (United States) Hilary English | (Switzerland) Conny Kissling |
| 26 | 2 | 19 January 1983 | (France) Tignes | MO | (United States) Hayley Wolff | (United States) Mary Jo Tiampo | (United States) Hilary English |
| 27 | 3 | 3 February 1983 | (Italy) Livigno | MO | (United States) Hayley Wolff | (Italy) Laura Colnaghi | (Sweden) Madeline Uvhagen |
| 28 | 4 | 5 February 1983 | (Italy) Livigno | MO | (United States) Hayley Wolff | (United States) Mary Jo Tiampo | (Switzerland) Erika Gallizzi |
| 29 | 5 | 16 March 1983 | (United States) Angel Fire | MO | (United States) Hilary English | (Canada) Lisa Downing | (United States) Mary Jo Tiampo |
| 30 | 6 | 18 March 1983 | (United States) Angel Fire | MO | (United States) Mary Jo Tiampo | (Canada) Marie-Claude Asselin | (United States) Hayley Wolff |

=== Aerials ===
| Num | Season | Date | Place | Event | Winner | Second | Third |
|---|---|---|---|---|---|---|---|
| 23 | 1 | 21 January 1983 | (France) Tignes | AE | (Canada) Marie-Claude Asselin | (United States) Liz Heidenreich | (Switzerland) Eveline Wirth |
| 24 | 2 | 22 January 1983 | (France) Tignes | AE | (Canada) Marie-Claude Asselin | (United States) Liz Heidenreich | (Austria) Andrea Amann |
| 25 | 3 | 4 February 1983 | (Italy) Livigno | AE | (Canada) Marie-Claude Asselin | (United States) Liz Heidenreich | (Switzerland) Eveline Wirth |
| 26 | 4 | 13 February 1983 | (Italy) Ravascletto | AE | (Canada) Marie-Claude Asselin | (Switzerland) Eveline Wirth | (Switzerland) Conny Kissling |
| 27 | 5 | 19 March 1983 | (United States) Angel Fire | AE | (Canada) Marie-Claude Asselin | (Switzerland) Conny Kissling | (Switzerland) Eveline Wirth |
| 28 | 6 | 19 March 1983 | (United States) Angel Fire | AE | (Canada) Marie-Claude Asselin | (Switzerland) Eveline Wirth | (Switzerland) Conny Kissling |

=== Combined ===
| Num | Season | Date | Place | Event | Winner | Second | Third |
|---|---|---|---|---|---|---|---|
| 23 | 1 | 21 January 1983 | (France) Tignes | CO | (Canada) Marie-Claude Asselin | (Switzerland) Conny Kissling | (United States) Hayley Wolff |
| 24 | 2 | 22 January 1983 | (France) Tignes | CO | (Switzerland) Conny Kissling | (Canada) Marie-Claude Asselin | (United States) Hayley Wolff |
| 25 | 3 | 4 February 1983 | (Italy) Livigno | CO | (Canada) Marie-Claude Asselin | (Switzerland) Conny Kissling | (Switzerland) Eveline Wirth |
| 26 | 4 | 13 February 1983 | (Italy) Ravascletto | CO | (Canada) Marie-Claude Asselin | (Switzerland) Conny Kissling | (United States) Hayley Wolff |
| 27 | 5 | 19 March 1983 | (United States) Angel Fire | CO | (Canada) Marie-Claude Asselin | (Switzerland) Eveline Wirth | (Switzerland) Conny Kissling |
| 28 | 6 | 19 March 1983 | (United States) Angel Fire | CO | (Switzerland) Conny Kissling | (Canada) Marie-Claude Asselin | (France) Catherine Frairer |

== Men's standings ==
=== Overall ===
| Rank | | Points |
|---|---|---|
| 1 | (Canada) Peter Judge | 66 |
| 1 | (Canada) Alain Laroche | 66 |
| 3 | (France) Eric Laboureix | 64 |
| 4 | (United Kingdom) Mike Nemesvary | 61 |
| 5 | (United States) Bruce Bolesky | 60 |

- Standings after 25 races.

=== Moguls ===
| Rank | | Points |
|---|---|---|
| 1 | (Canada) Bill Keenan | 98 |
| 2 | (Sweden) Stefan Engstroem | 93 |
| 3 | (Sweden) Lasse Fahlen | 93 |
| 4 | (France) Philippe Deiber | 90 |
| 5 | (Italy) Mauro Mottini | 88 |

- Standings after 6 races.

=== Aerials ===
| Rank | | Points |
|---|---|---|
| 1 | (Switzerland) Sandro Wirth | 97 |
| 2 | (Canada) Craig Clow | 92 |
| 3 | (Canada) Alain Laroche | 90 |
| 4 | (Canada) Jean Corriveau | 90 |
| 5 | (United Kingdom) Mike Nemesvary | 87 |

- Standings after 6 races.

=== Ballet ===
| Rank | | Points |
|---|---|---|
| 1 | (West Germany) Richard Schabl | 124 |
| 2 | (West Germany) Hermann Reitberger | 123 |
| 3 | (West Germany) Ernst Garhammer | 116 |
| 4 | (France) Jacques Poillion | 108 |
| 5 | (United States) Bruce Bolesky | 102 |

- Standings after 7 races.

=== Combined ===
| Rank | | Points |
|---|---|---|
| 1 | (Canada) Alain Laroche | 42 |
| 2 | (France) Eric Laboureix | 42 |
| 3 | (Canada) Peter Judge | 40 |
| 4 | (United Kingdom) Mike Nemesvary | 39 |
| 5 | (United States) Bruce Bolesky | 38 |

- Standings after 6 races.

== Ladies' standings ==
=== Overall ===
| Rank | | Points |
|---|---|---|
| 1 | (Switzerland) Conny Kissling | 35 |
| 2 | (Canada) Marie-Claude Asselin | 34 |
| 3 | (Switzerland) Eveline Wirth | 26 |
| 4 | (United States) Hayley Wolff | 24 |
| 5 | (France) Catherine Frairer | 23 |

- Standings after 25 races.

=== Moguls ===
| Rank | | Points |
|---|---|---|
| 1 | (United States) Hayley Wolff | 46 |
| 2 | (United States) Mary Jo Tiampo | 46 |
| 3 | (Switzerland) Erika Gallizzi | 37 |
| 4 | (United States) Hilary English | 33 |
| 5 | (Canada) Marie-Claude Asselin | 32 |

- Standings after 6 races.

=== Aerials ===
| Rank | | Points |
|---|---|---|
| 1 | (Canada) Marie-Claude Asselin | 48 |
| 2 | (United States) Liz Heidenreich | 42 |
| 3 | (Switzerland) Eveline Wirth | 42 |
| 4 | (Switzerland) Conny Kissling | 40 |
| 5 | (France) Catherine Frairer | 30 |

- Standings after 6 races.

=== Ballet ===
| Rank | | Points |
|---|---|---|
| 1 | (United States) Jan Bucher | 60 |
| 2 | (France) Christine Rossi | 56 |
| 3 | (Switzerland) Conny Kissling | 51 |
| 4 | (Canada) Lucie Barma | 43 |
| 5 | (United States) Liz Heidenreich | 40 |

- Standings after 7 races.

=== Combined ===
| Rank | | Points |
|---|---|---|
| 1 | (Canada) Marie-Claude Asselin | 32 |
| 2 | (Switzerland) Conny Kissling | 30 |
| 3 | (Switzerland) Eveline Wirth | 23 |
| 4 | (United States) Hayley Wolff | 22 |
| 5 | (France) Catherine Frairer | 22 |

- Standings after 6 races.
