= Joyce Porter Arneill =

American political leader

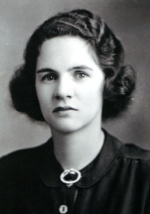
- Arneill in circa 1938

President of the National Federation of Republican Women
- In office 1938–1940
- Preceded by: Position established
- Succeeded by: Judy Weis

Personal details
- Born: Joyce Porter; June 10, 1908 Stamford, Connecticut, U.S.
- Died: June 4, 1990 (aged 81) Denver, Colorado, U.S.
- Resting place: Fairmount Cemetery, Denver, Colorado
- Party: Republican Party (United States)
- Spouse: James Rae Arneill Jr. (m. 1929–1986)
- Children: 2
- Parent(s): Louis Hopkins Porter, Ellen Marion Porter
- Relatives: Arthur Kingsley Porter (uncle) Beatrice Porter (sister)
- Education: Low-Heywood School Bryn Mawr College Yale School of Nursing
- Occupation: Political activist, Philanthropist
- Known for: Co-founding the National Federation of Republican Women

Joyce Porter Arneill (June 10, 1908 – June 4, 1990) was an American political leader, philanthropist and community activist. She co-founded and served as the first president of the National Federation of Republican Women from 1938 to 1941, playing a key role in mobilizing Republican women nationwide. A Colorado delegate in the 1939 presidential election, she was also involved in local community organizations, including the Denver Dumb Friends League (an animal rights and rescue organization). In addition to her political work, Arneill was an accomplished golfer, winning the Colorado Women's Open Championship in 1931. She was married to Dr. James Rae Arneill Jr., with whom she had two sons.

== Biography ==
Joyce Porter was born on June 10, 1908, in Stamford, Connecticut, to Louis Hopkins Porter and Mrs. Ellen Marion Porter of Stamford, Connecticut. She was the niece of Arthur Kingsley Porter, a distinguished academic and art historian, known for his contributions to the study of medieval art. Joyce had one sister, Beatrice Porter.

Arneill grew up in a politically engaged household in Stamford, Connecticut.

Her father, Louis H. Porter, was a corporation lawyer and manufacturer, and her uncle, Schuyler Merritt, was a long-serving member of Congress and mentored her. This environment exposed her to discussions on politics and economics from a young age.

Joyce attended a finishing school and attended Bryn Mawr College (for two years) and the Yale School of Nursing (for two years) in New Haven.

During her time at Yale, she met James Rae Arneill Jr., a medical student from Denver, Colorado. The two eventually married.

== Founding of the National Federation of Republican Women ==
Following the founding of the National Federation of Republican Women in December 1937, Arneill worked closely with Marion Martin, who served as the executive director of the federation, to expand its reach.

In September 1938, Arneill was elected as the first president of the newly established National Federation of Women's Republican Clubs of America during a meeting held in Chicago. At the age of 30, she took on the role of organizing and mobilizing Republican women across the country.

The federation, directed by Marion Martin, assistant chairman of the Republican National Committee, aimed to expand its membership to 500,000 by the 1940 election. Its objectives included educating women on political issues, supporting Republican candidates, and promoting principles such as freedom, equality, and justice.

Prior to this position, Arneill had organized the Independent Coalition of American Women in Colorado in 1936, where she helped form 23 clubs with approximately 3,000 members. Her experience in Colorado contributed to her selection as president, where she focused on increasing women's participation in the Republican Party and promoting their involvement in political activities.

By the federation's first official meeting in September 1938, held in Chicago, the organization had already grown to include statewide federations from eleven states and the District of Columbia, along with seventy-five individual clubs from twelve additional states. Arneill’s efforts were instrumental in helping the federation quickly grow to represent approximately 95,000 women, significantly outpacing the League of Women Voters' membership of 43,116 at that time.

In 1940, Arneill emphasized to the Missouri Federation of Republican Women's Clubs that the New Deal had sparked a level of political engagement among women that was previously uncommon.

In September 1940, Federation's first national assembly, held in Detroit. This two-day meeting marked the organization's first major gathering since its founding two years earlier. The event brought together representatives from more than 3,000 affiliated clubs.

During the assembly, Arneill introduced Wendell L. Willkie, the Republican Presidential nominee, at a mass meeting held in the Olympia Auditorium. She co-directed the federation meetings alongside Marion E. Martin, the federation's executive director and founder, who also served as the director of the Republican Party's women's division.

=== Political career and contributions ===
Arneill co-founded the National Federation of Republican Women and served as its first president from 1939 to 1941. Under her leadership, the organization grew to include approximately 160,000 members. She was also a Republican delegate for Colorado during the 1939 presidential election, where she played a key role in engaging women in political activities and supporting the Republican Party.

Arneill was actively involved in the early development of the NFRW, serving as its first president from its founding in 1938 until 1941. Arneill was succeeded by Jessica M. Weis in 1941.

== Community service and hobbies ==
Beyond her political contributions, Arneill was active in various community organizations. She served on the board of the Denver Dumb Friends League from the 1940s to the 1970s, reflecting her commitment to animal welfare. She was also a member of the Denver Garden Club, the Colorado Orchid Club, and the Denver Botanic Gardens, where she pursued her passion for gardening.

She was an accomplished golfer who won the first Colorado Women's Open Golf Championship in 1931 at Cherry Hills. That same year, she set a record at the Denver Country Club. She won multiple women's club championships at the Denver Country Club and once scored 80 from the men's tees.

== Personal life ==
=== Marriage and children ===
On June 22, 1929, Joyce Porter Arneill married James Rae Arneill Jr., in a prominent social event held at Blachley Hall, the home of her parents in Stamford, Connecticut. The outdoor ceremony took place in a flower garden and was officiated by Rev. Gerald A. Cunningham, rector of St. John's Episcopal Church.

Following the ceremony, a grand reception was held, attended by approximately 1,000 guests. The bride was accompanied by several attendants, including her sister, Beatrice Porter, as maid of honor, along with bridesmaids Frances Allen, Marie Lynah, Margaret Holloran, Marion Neilson, Carla Swan, and Mrs. William Downs (the groom’s sister).

James Rae Arneill Jr., the son of Mr. and Mrs. James Rae Arneill of Denver, Colorado, was a recent graduate of Hotchkiss School, Yale University, and had completed his medical degree at Yale Medical School in June 1929.

Her husband went on to found the Arneill Medical Center and was instrumental in establishing the Forney Transportation Museum.

On Tuesday, May 1, 1934, their son was born at the Harkness Pavilion, located at 70 Haven Avenue in New York City.

== Death and legacy ==
Arneill was described as energetic and dedicated to a variety of interests, ranging from gardening to community service. Her husband, James R. Arneill Jr., died in 1986, and in her later years, Arneill became less active due to health issues.

She died on June 4, 1990, at the age of 81, at her home in Denver. She was buried at Fairmount Cemetery. Arneill was survived by her two sons, James Arneill III of Denver and Bruce Porter Arneill of Mount Carmel, Connecticut, as well as seven grandchildren and two great-grandchildren.
