= Cult of Carts =

The Cult of Carts (a term coined by the architectural historian A. K. Porter) is various occasions in western Europe during the 12th and 13th centuries, when ordinary lay-people harnessed themselves to carts in the place of oxen in order to transport building materials to cathedral building sites.

== Precursors to the 'Cults of Carts' ==
Throughout European history there have been several documentary accounts of occasions when the public spontaneously came together to labour on some important building project (the earliest being Suetonius' account of the rebuilding of the Temple of Jupiter Optimus Maximus in Rome after a fire in AD 70). In medieval Europe, perhaps the most widely known and influential of these events occurred during the building of the Benedictine Abbey at Montecassino (Italy) in 1066. The Abbey's chronicler, Peter the Deacon, described how a crowd of pious lay people spontaneously seized some heavy marble columns which had been delivered from Rome and carried them up the long steep hill to the building site, singing and praying as they went.

A similar story was also told of the building of another Benedictine monastery at St Trond (now Sint-Truiden in Belgium), c.1155, which was included in an early 12th-century account of the Abbey's history by its Abbot, Adelhard II.

== Major 'Cult of Carts' episodes in medieval France ==
The first such account from the Gothic period was written by Abbot Suger of St Denis, who had visited Montecassino in 1123 and was familiar with the story of its construction. In his account of the building of the Abbey of St Denis (written c.1144) Suger described how, after finding some Roman marble columns in a disused quarry near Pontoise, he began to despair of ever retrieving them from the forest - until a crowd of local people of all social ranks came together of their own volition, tied ropes to the columns and dragged them to the road, accompanied by many spontaneous displays of pious devotion.

In 1145, a few years after the incident described by Suger, one of the most famous 'Cult of Cart' miracles occurred at Chartres, where Bishop Fulbert's cathedral was nearing completion. The event was described in a letter claiming to be an eye-witness account, written by Abbot Haymo of Saint-Pierre-sur-Dives to the monks of Tutbury Abbey in England. Haymo described how the citizens of Chartres, of all social classes, harnessed themselves to carts like oxen and dragged materials to the building site as an act of mass piety which involved the singing of hymns and the acceptance of chastisement from members of the clergy.

In the following years a number of similar events supposedly occurred in other towns around France the last recorded at Châlons-sur-Marne around 1171. However most of these events are known only from a single source, usually written by a member of the clergy from the relevant church. Several of these contemporary accounts are very similar in style and in details, which casts some doubt on their accuracy and also on the genuine spontaneity of these events, which may instead have been orchestrated by the local clergy.

== Aftermath of the 'Cults of Carts' ==
An attempt was made to revive the practice in early 14th century Rome when material for the rebuilding of the Basilica of St. John Lateran was supposedly dragged in carts by local women, who would not allow the stones to be 'defiled by animals'. Generally however stories of the practice died out as opportunities for the expression of lay piety became more normalised through confraternities and other social structures.

During the Gothic-revivals of the 19th and early 20th centuries, various writers used the supposedly spontaneous outbreaks of popular piety exemplified by the 'Cults of Carts' to evoke an over-romanticised view of medieval Europe as a religious golden-age. More modern scholarship has tended to view the stories more sceptically. As with all such foundation myths, evidence from documentary accounts must be tempered by an understanding of the role of such stories in promoting individual churches (and the Benedictine order in general) and also by the tendency of medieval chroniclers to adapt and copy stories from earlier texts (see topos).
