= Suther =

Suther is a surname. Notable people with the surname include:

- John Suther (1907–1984), American college football player
- Thomas Suther (1814–1883), Scottish bishop

== See also ==
- Suthers
