= John Shearman =

English art historian

John Kinder Gowran Shearman (pronounced "Sherman"; 24 June 1931 – 11 August 2003) was an English art historian who also taught in America. He was a specialist in Italian Renaissance painting, described by his colleague James S. Ackerman as "the leading scholar of Italian Renaissance painting", who published several influential works, but whose expected major book on Quattrocento painting, for the Pelican History of Art (commissioned in 1984, and still a gap in the series in 2019), never appeared. However, what is widely acknowledged as his most influential book, on the concept of Mannerism, published in 1967, is still in print.

== Early life and education ==
Born in 1931 to Charles E. G. Shearman, a British army brigadier, and Evelyn Shearman (née White) in Aldershot, Hampshire, John Shearman was educated in Surrey at St Edmund's School, Hindhead, and Felsted School in Essex. After completing his two year National Service in Germany, he took up a place at The Courtauld Institute of Art in 1951 at the invitation of Samuel Courtauld, who he had met while on a school trip to London; Shearman’s interest in art and architecture having been stimulated by his father, a keen amateur artist, and his grandfather, Ernest Charles Shearman, a respected British ecclesiastical architect. Shearman graduated from the Courtauld with a degree in art history in 1955 and completed his Ph.D. in 1957. His doctoral thesis, Developments in the Use of Colour in Tuscan Paintings of the Early 16th Century, was supervised by the eminent art historian Johannes Wilde, to whom Shearman later dedicated his book on Andrea del Sarto in 1965.

== Career ==
Shearman remained at the Courtauld after completing his studies firstly as a lecturer, becoming Fellow of the Institute for Advanced Study in Princeton, New Jersey from 1964, then Reader at the Courtauld from 1967, and Deputy Director 1974–1979. He had hoped for the Directorship of the Courtauld upon the retirement of Anthony Blunt in 1974 but his application was not successful; the position going to the medievalist Peter Lasko, who had administrative experience, although some believed it was Shearman’s close association with Blunt, already falling out of favour, that thwarted this aspiration. During his time at the Courtauld he contributed photographs to the Conway Library whose archive, of primarily architectural images, is being digitised under the wider Courtauld Connects project. After his death, his library, containing substantial resources on Renaissance and Baroque art including about 200 books on Raphael, was bequeathed to the Courtauld.

Five years after his failure to become Director of the Courtauld Institute Shearman returned to Princeton, where he was chair of the art and archaeology department from 1979. Shearman moved to Harvard University in 1987 as professor of fine arts and, in 1989, he received the William Dorr Boardman Professorship becoming chair of the Fine Arts Department from 1990 to 1993. In 1994, until his retirement in 2002, he was Charles Adams University Professor.

Often involved in identifying and conserving works of art, Shearman worked with the Italian and Vatican authorities on issues including the damage after the 1966 Flood of the River Arno in Florence and the Restoration of the Sistine Chapel frescoes, serving on the Pontifical Advisory Commission. He also served on the UNESCO international advisory committee for the restoration of Leonardo da Vinci’s The Last Supper, that took more than twenty years from 1979 to 1999. As curator he even oversaw the restoration of the Faculty Room while at Harvard.

In 2001, he identified an Andrea del Sarto altarpiece that had been lost for 350 years. He also served on various editorial boards, including The Burlington Magazine (1968–2003), L’Arte (1969–73), Art Quarterly (1969–72), RILA/BHA (1971–99), Art 562 Benjamin Paul History (1977–78), and the Zeitschrift für Kunstgeschichte (1984–89).

His book Raphael in Early Modern Sources 1483 to 1600, which he announced he was working on at a conference in honour of Raphael’s five hundredth birthday at the Bibliotheca Hertziana in Rome in 1983, was completed shortly before his death and published posthumously in 2003. The dedication of the book to his teachers at the Courtauld, Anthony Blunt and Johannes Wilde, reflects, as Benjamin Paul said in his obituary for the British Academy, that Shearman “had come full circle and truly completed his life’s work”. A festschrift, aptly named Coming About…a Festschrift for John Shearman, making reference to Shearman’s love of sailing, was published in 2001 with contributions from no fewer than fifty-three of his students, honouring his status as “a consummate scholar-teacher”.

== Honours ==
1976 Fellow of the British Academy

1979 The Serena Medal for Italian Studies, British Academy

1979 Fellow Accademia del Disegno, Florence

1983 Bronze Medal of the Collège de France

1993 Fellow of the American Academy of Arts & Sciences

1994 The Charles Rufus Morey Award for his book Only Connect: Art and the Spectator in the Italian Renaissance

1995 Fellow Accademia si San Luca, Rome

2000/2001 Honorary Fellow of the Courtauld Institute of Art

He was also a Fellow of the Accademia Raffaello (Urbino)

== Private life ==
Shearman was married three times; in 1957 to Jane Dalrymple Smith (d.1982) with whom he had four children (one son, Michael and three daughters, Juliet, Niccola and Sarah). Shortly after his first wife’s death, he married Sally Roskill, the first wife of the art historian Mark Roskill, although they divorced in 1997, and, in 1998, he married fellow art historian Kathryn Brush, Distinguished University Professor Emerita at the University of Western Ontario.

He was a keen sailor, interested in yacht and dinghy sailing, and a member of the Bembridge Sailing Club.

John Shearman died of a heart attack near Lethbridge, Alberta on a holiday with his wife in the Rocky Mountains in 2003.

== Publications ==
His publications include:

- Andrea del Sarto Oxford: Clarendon Press, 1965
- Mannerism, London, Penguin/Baltimore, MD, 1967
- Raphael's Cartoons in the Collection of Her Majesty the Queen, and the Tapestries for the Sistine Chapel. London: Phaidon, 1972; edited, and Hirst, Michael. Wilde, Johannes.
- The Vatican Stanze: Functions and Decorations. British Academy Italian Lecture 1971. London: Oxford University Press, 1972
- Michelangelo: Six Lectures. New York: Oxford University Press, 1978
- The Early Italian Pictures in the Collection of Her Majesty the Queen, Cambridge, UK: Cambridge University Press, 1983
- Only Connect: Art and the Spectator in the Italian Renaissance, A. W. Mellon lectures in the Fine Arts 1988 Bollingen Series 35, 37. Princeton, NJ: Princeton University Press, 1992
- Raphael in Early Modern Sources 1483–1602, 2003, Yale University Press, ISBN 0-300-09918-5 (Updated edition)
