= 1939 United States elections =

The following is an overview of elections in the United States held in 1939.

== Federal elections ==
Federal-level elected officers are United States senator and United States representative. These are only held in even-numbered years, except to fill a vacated seat.

In 1939, there were no such special elections for the Senate, and ten such elections for the House of Representatives. All ten of the newly elected representatives were of the same party as the representative who had previously occupied the vacated seat (eight Democrats, two Republicans). The most historically significant was the election of Estes Kefauver, who became a national figure and won most of the 1952 Democratic Party presidential primaries. Kefauver went on to earn a reputation as an anti-corruption campaigner. In 1950, the Senate, led by Kefauver, investigated numerous charges of corruption among senior officials of Harry S. Truman's administration, some of whom had received fur coats and deep freezers in exchange for favors. A large number of employees of the Internal Revenue Bureau (today the IRS) were accepting bribes; 166 employees either resigned or were fired in 1950, with many soon facing indictment. When Attorney General J. Howard McGrath fired the special prosecutor in early 1952 for being too zealous, Truman fired McGrath.

== State elections ==
At the state level, voters weighed in on a wide range of ballot measures. In the 1939 New York state election, the legalization of parimutuel betting was approved by a ballot measure, despite opposition by NYC Mayor Fiorello La Guardia. There was no change in power in the three gubernatorial elections that year.

The background of this election was the beginning of World War II in Europe.

== See also ==
- 1939 United States House of Representatives elections
- 1939 United States gubernatorial elections
- 1939 New York state election

== Sources ==
- Smaltz, Donald C. (January 29, 1996). "Speech Delivered by Donald C. Smaltz". University of North Texas Libraries.
- Smaltz, Donald C. (July 1998). "Independent Counsel: A View from Inside". The Georgetown Law Journal. 86 (6).
