= Lucy Wallace Porter =

American photographer

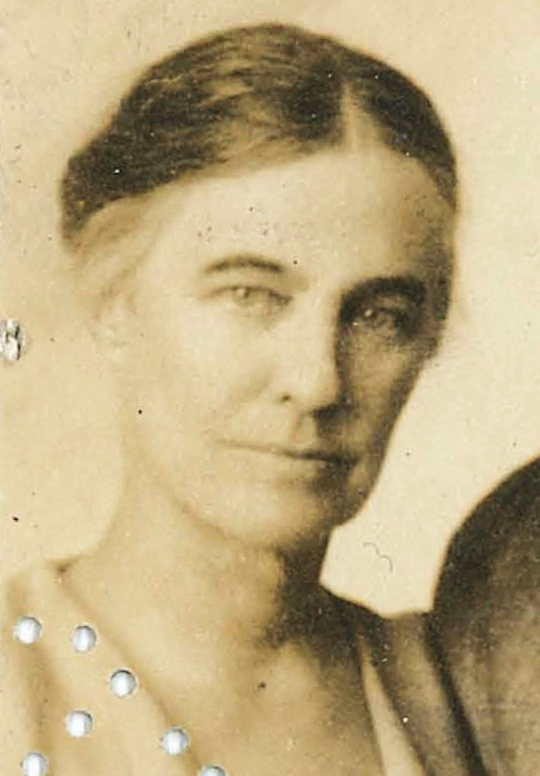
Lucy Wallace Porter, 1933 passport photograph

Lucy Wallace Porter (January 23, 1876 – September 19, 1962), also known as Lucy Bryant Wallace, was an American photographer. In 1912 she married the Harvard medievalist, Arthur Kingsley Porter (1883–1933). His published works included Romanesque Sculpture of the Pilgrimage Roads and Spanish Romanesque Sculpture. He is known to have been an innovative “scholar-photographer” though later critical studies have shown that Porter was the principal photographer who accompanied him on his travels from 1919 onwards.

Kathryn Brush (University of Western Ontario, Canada) has researched Porter's contribution to her husband's work and concluded by recognising her as a major photographer in her own right. Brush writes that following their marriage, Wallace Porter went on to produce 'more than two-thirds of the photographs published in his distinguished Romanesque Sculpture of the Pilgrimage Roads.

Upon her death, her estate was bequeathed to Harvard University.

== Background and education ==
=== Early life ===
Porter was born and raised in Ansonia, Connecticut, the daughter of Thomas Wallace and Ellen Bryant. Her father and uncle co-owned Wallace & Sons, a large factory that produced copper wires for electronics.

=== Education ===
She studied art history, music, and the sciences at Miss Porter's Young Ladies' School in Farmington, Connecticut. She then enrolled in Yale's School of Music within one of the first classes to admit women in 1895–1896.

=== Early career ===
After leaving school, Porter went through two years (1897–1899) of specialised study at the Chicago Kindergarten College, an industry that was then considered to be very modern and progressive in America. After beginning her career in New York City schools, in 1906 she resumed her studies in Columbia's Teachers College which was then 'one of America's most forward-looking institutions of its type'. During these years, she specialised in art, history, and literature.

== Photographic practice ==
In 1912 she married the Harvard medievalist, Arthur Kingsley Porter (1883–1933). Porter does not appear to have any formal training in large-format photography. Rather, it was immediately after her wedding (when the couple sailed for Europe) when she began to experiment with the medium. During this period, Kingsley Porter taught Wallace Porter how to operate a large-format view camera equipped with glass plate negatives. Kathryn Brush (University of Western Ontario, Canada) has researched Porter's contribution to her husband's work. According to Brush, the lessons were accompanied by the manual Fotografia per i dilettanti (Photography for Amateurs) by Giovanni Muffone.

As Brush writes, 'the caliber of the "student's" photographs quickly exceeded those of her more experienced husband'. Her photography demonstrated a 'superior command of lighting, exposure, and composition', with subject matter encompassing a diverse range of church features. Kingsley Porter, noting Porter's talents, published 26 of her photographs in his volume of Lombard Architecture that was published by Yale University Press in 1915. During their travels in 1918 and 1919 in France, where Kingsley Porter was commissioned to document damaged medieval churches, Porter continued to develop her photographic acumen. Kingsley Porter even acknowledged that Porter's skills were far superior to his in a letter to his brother on May 12, 1919:

Photographs have gone better than before – Lucy runs the cameras exclusively now, and does much better with them than I ever did. She has the large camera, with 8×10 or 5×7 plates, and also a smaller one, which we can carry by hand, which takes 4×5 plates. We are able now to procure all the plates we need, so the photographs are going well. I trust that nothing breaks or gives out, for it is almost impossible to get repairs made.

Porter's contribution to her husband's publications would continue to have a significant impact on his career. Brush notes that she helped him to 'judge, compare, and envision links among sculptors and sculptures all over Europe, especially in the regions of present-day France, Spain, and Italy'. Porter was the principal photographer who accompanied him on his travels from 1919 onwards. Kingsley Porter's published works included Romanesque Sculpture of the Pilgrimage Roads (1923) and Spanish Romanesque Sculpture (1928). He is known to have been an innovative “scholar-photographer”. Brush writes that following their marriage, Porter went on to produce 'more than two-thirds of the photographs published in Romanesque Sculpture of the Pilgrimage Roads'. Brush concluded by recognising her as a major photographer in her own right.

=== Style ===
Scholars studying Porter's photographs have noted the direct, front-on view which aligned with the expectations of modern art scholars more than the perspectives of medieval viewers:

In almost all cases, Lucy Porter's photographs proclaim their modernity by representing eleventh- and twelfth-century sculpture separated from its architectural contexts [...] Lucy's post-war photography among the ruins of northern France made her well versed in this modernist practice. Despite the constraints imposed upon her, much of her work from the first half of the 1920s displayed considerable creativity and imagination. She produced a number of images that are striking in their design, artistic quality, and expressiveness, including her now "classic" photograph of the Old Testament prophet Jeremiah carved on the trumeau at Moissac.

== Collections and exhibitions ==
=== Collections ===
In 1949 Porter donated the collection of photographs taken by the couple on their journeys to Europe to Harvard University's Fogg Art Museum. The collection is now held at Harvard's Arthur Kingsley Porter Teaching and Research Collection, Special Collections, Fine Arts Library. By the late 1970s the majority of the Porters' photographic history had been destroyed as a result of the 'deteriorating and highly flammable cellulose nitrate negatives'. Before their removal, 35 mm negatives were made at the Library. Dumbarton Oaks, Harvard's research center in Washington, D.C., had also made 2000 prints of photographs featuring Byzantine objects from the original nitrate negatives. The Department of Image Collections at the National Gallery of Art Library in Washington, D.C. has approximately 3,200 photographs of art and architecture taken by the Porters as well as an additional 6,400 photographs from Kingsley Porter's teaching and research collection.

In the late 1980s, an exchange between the Getty Museum and Harvard's visual collections also resulted in some 2000 new prints from the Porters' Collection being made for the Getty.

Photographs attributed to Porter are also to be found in the Conway Library's collection of architectural photographs at the Courtauld Institute of Art, London. This collection is currently (2020) being digitised as part of the Courtauld Connects project.

=== Exhibitions ===
An exhibition titled Camera Woman Along the Medieval Pilgrimage Roads: The Early 20th-Century Photography of Lucy Wallace Porter was held at Harvard University from August to November 2018. It described Porter as 'one of the most influential women photographers in the field of art history during the twentieth century'. The exhibition was curated by Kathryn Brush (University of Western Ontario) and Joanna Bloom (Photographic Resources Librarian, Harvard Fine Arts Library).

== Death and legacy ==
Porter died on September 19, 1962, at Cambridge, Massachusetts, US. Upon her death, her estate was bequeathed to Harvard.
