= Marion Martin (politician) =

American politician (1900-1987)

Marion Ella Martin
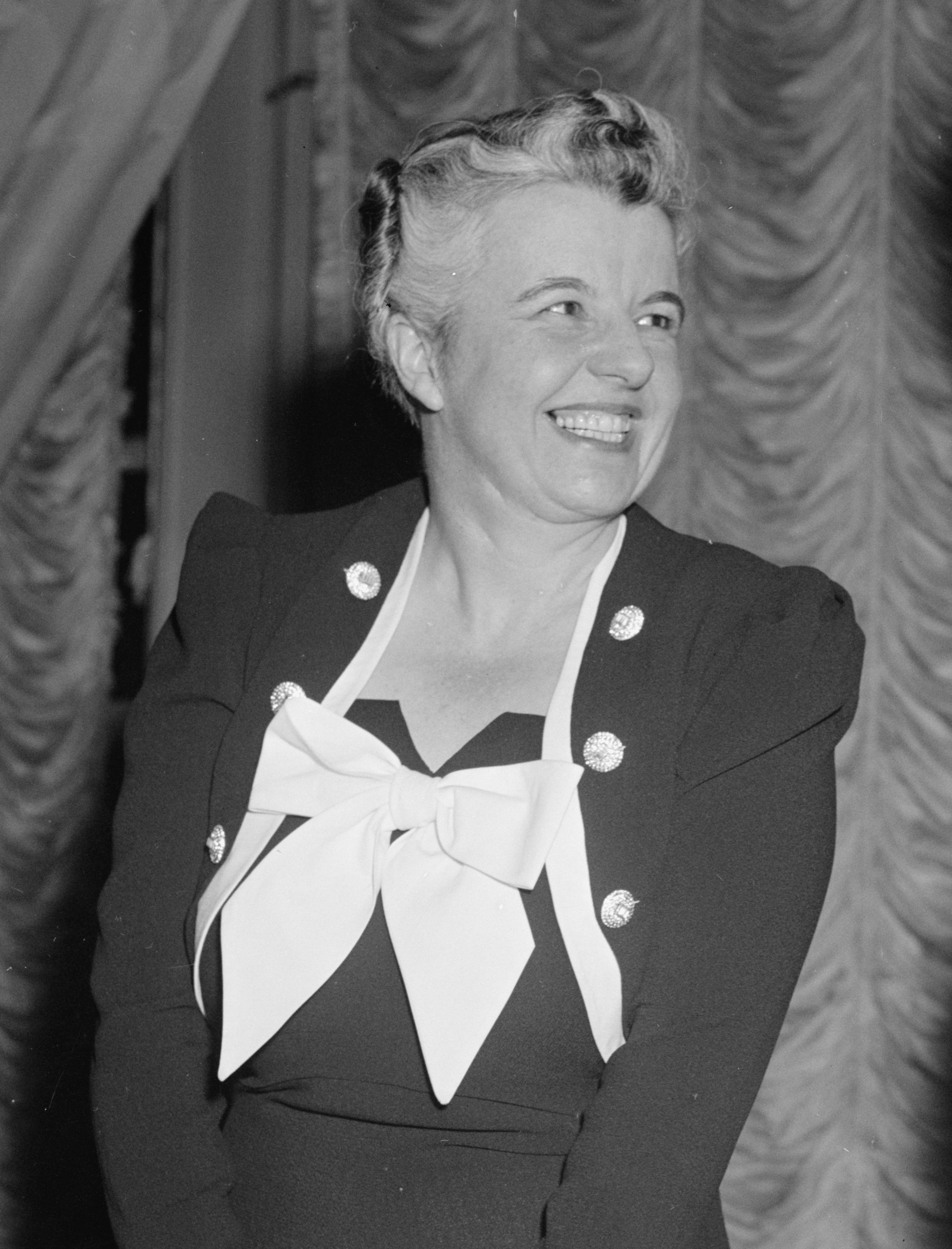
- Martin in 1939

Assistant Chairman of the Republican National Committee
- In office 1936–1946

Commissioner of Labor and Industry of Maine
- In office 1947–1972
- Governor: Horace Hildreth

Member of the Maine Senate
- In office 1934–1938

Member of the Maine House of Representatives
- In office 1930–1934

Personal details
- Born: Marion Ella Martin; April 8, 1900 Kingman, Maine, U.S.
- Died: January 8, 1987 (aged 86) Hallowell, Maine, U.S.
- Party: Republican
- Education: Wellesley College; University of Maine (BA)
- Alma mater: University of Maine

Marion Ella Martin (April 8, 1900 – January 8, 1987) was an American politician and women's rights advocate known for her work within the Republican Party in the mid-20th century. She served as a Maine state legislator and later as Assistant Chairman of the Republican National Committee, where she founded the National Federation of Republican Women (NFRW) to coordinate women's political efforts. Martin focused on integrating women into established political structures and encouraged their participation in mainstream party activities. Her initiatives contributed to expanding women's roles within the Republican Party during that era.

== Early life and education ==
Marion Ella Martin was born in Kingman, Maine on April 8, 1900, to William Henry Martin and Florence McLaughlin Martin. William Martin, who ran a wholesale potato business, and Florence Martin, was involved in civic activism.

The Martin family was prosperous and supportive, encouraging their daughter's ambitions of becoming a research chemist. In 1913, they sent her to Bradford Academy, a private secondary school for girls in Massachusetts. She graduated from the academy in 1917.

Following her graduation in 1917, Martin enrolled at Wellesley College. During her second year, she contracted tuberculosis, which led her to leave school and return to her family's home in Maine. She experienced a period of lethargy that persisted until the late 1920s. A subsequent trip around the world reportedly improved her health. Martin, despite her privileged upbringing, emphasized the importance of perseverance in overcoming challenges, which influenced her later work as a Republican and advocate for women's rights.

After returning from her travels, Martin resumed her education and public activities. She continued her studies and earned a bachelor's degree in economics from the University of Maine in 1935, at the age of 35.

During her political career, Martin pursued additional legal studies, taking courses at Yale University and Northwestern University between legislative sessions.

== Political career in Maine ==
Martin served two terms in both the Maine House of Representatives and the State Senate from 1931 to 1938. One of the few women in the state legislature at the time, she gained recognition for her political skills. In 1936, the Portland Evening Express noted her success in navigating the predominantly male political landscape, describing her as meeting "the tests of a man’s game."

While serving in the legislature, Martin developed an interest in legal matters and became the first non-lawyer to chair the Senate's Legal Affairs Committee. To enhance her legislative work, she attended law courses at Yale. During this period, she came to the attention of the Republican National Committee (RNC)..

== National Republican Party ==
In 1937, Marion Martin was appointed as the assistant chairman for women’s activities within the Republican National Committee (RNC). At that time, the Republican Party was facing challenges after significant losses in the 1936 elections. Martin was given the responsibility of revitalizing women's involvement in the party, which led her to establish the National Federation of Women’s Republican Clubs (NFWRC), later known as the National Federation of Republican Women (NFRW). With the assistance of Joyce Porter Arneill, chosen to be president, the organization successfully unified various women's clubs into a national network, quickly growing to over 100,000 members within a year. By 1946, the federation's membership had expanded to 400,000 members.

Martin played a crucial role in shaping the early political activism of Republican women. As the head of the RNC's Women’s Division, she was instrumental in creating the NFWRC in 1938, a move designed to consolidate local Republican women’s clubs into a unified national organization. Martin's strategy focused on integration, encouraging women to work within the established party framework rather than independently. She emphasized party loyalty while discouraging extremist positions, aiming to align women's political efforts with the broader Republican agenda.

Despite her efforts to secure women a more significant role in policy-making, achieving substantial influence within the party often remained elusive. Nonetheless, Martin’s work laid the foundation for increased female participation in Republican politics, helping women navigate the post-suffrage era's challenges of whether to work within the party or pursue independent agendas. The NFRW officially came into existence on September 23-24, 1938, at a meeting held at the Palmer House in Chicago. Starting with 11 charter states, the organization quickly grew into one of the largest women's political groups in the United States.

== Later career ==
From 1947 until her retirement in 1972, Martin was consecutively appointed by two Republican and two Democratic governors to serve as Commissioner of Labor and Industry in Maine, where she made significant contributions to the state’s labor policies.

For 30 years, Martin served on the board of directors of the National Safety Council, including eight years as vice president and 28 years as a member of the executive committee. In 1970, she was appointed to the Presidential Task Force on Traffic Safety, and from 1970 to 1972, she served on the advisory committee on occupational safety for the U.S. Department of Labor.

Martin was also a trustee of Bradford College in Massachusetts for 12 years and led its alumni association as president for three years. In recognition of her service, she was awarded the college’s first Dorothy Bell Medallion in 1978 for her "distinguished achievement as a volunteer and professional in improving the lives of others through devoted service to her school, state, and nation."

== Political views ==
Marion Martin, a staunch conservative, closely aligned with the Republican Party throughout the 1930s and 1940s. Her views on women's political involvement were assimilationist. She believed that women needed to conform to the established male-dominated political sphere to achieve equality. Martin was critical of women's clubs that engaged in what she saw as trivial activities, arguing that such behavior hindered women's credibility as serious political participants.

=== Education ===
Martin emphasized the importance of an educated citizenry, stating that “one percent of our people . . . think and the other 99 percent emote.” She expressed the view that leadership positions should be held by informed and hardworking individuals, while those unwilling to put in the effort should not expect political recognition.

=== Extremism and New Deal ===
Martin was critical of the New Deal, describing it as leading to a "breakdown in American morale" due to fomenting "class hatreds." She believed the New Deal government was wasteful and corrupt and was skeptical that an activist federal government could resolve social issues.

=== Party Loyalty and Women’s Representation ===
Martin thought that the Republican Party needed to acknowledge the contributions of women, not just through praise but through meaningful appointments. She criticized Republicans for choosing “dummies” to represent them and instead advocated for appointing qualified women who were genuinely capable of contributing to the party’s success.

=== Social Class and Strikes ===
While Martin was generally opposed to strikes, she acknowledged that they could sometimes address “justifiable grievances.” However, she was cautious, recognizing that outright opposition to labor strikes could harm the Republican Party's image as it might reinforce the perception of the party being anti-labor.

=== Women’s Political Involvement ===
While advocating for women's advancement in politics, Martin was cautious about framing this progress as a “women’s crusade.” She criticized the tendency of women to be swayed by emotional rhetoric, which she believed made them susceptible to extremist movements. Martin warned against "alarmist" groups, noting that women were often drawn to such causes, which she felt undermined their political effectiveness.

=== Women's employment rights ===
Martin emphasized the need for women to prepare for post-World War II job competition with men. Drawing from the experiences following World War I, she warned that returning soldiers would likely resent the increased presence of women in the workforce. Martin urged women to take proactive steps to protect their employment rights, including utilizing their voting power in upcoming elections. She stressed that many women had become permanent breadwinners and that the nation must accept their role in industry. Additionally, Martin called for the elimination of discriminatory legislation, such as bans on employing both spouses in government jobs, and predicted that women would play a decisive role in the 1944 election, potentially electing a Republican president.

== Death and legacy ==
=== Death ===
Marion E. Martin died on January 8, 1987, in Hallowell, Maine at her home, at the age of 86.

=== Legacy ===
Martin became a key figure in mobilizing women on behalf of the Republican Party during the late 1930s and 1940s. In establishing the National Federation of Women’s Republican Clubs, Martin sought to shift away from the practices and ideals that clubwomen of the 1920s had previously championed—such as independence, separatism, a crusading political style, and a focus on women’s moral superiority.

She is survived by three nephews: William H. Martin of Bethesda, Maryland; Richard A. Martin of Potomac, Maryland; and Ralph E. Martin of Richmond, Virginia, as well as a niece, Mary Gillman of Winchester, Virginia. A funeral service was held on January 10 in Augusta, Maine.
