= Jessica M. Weis =

American politician (1901–1963)

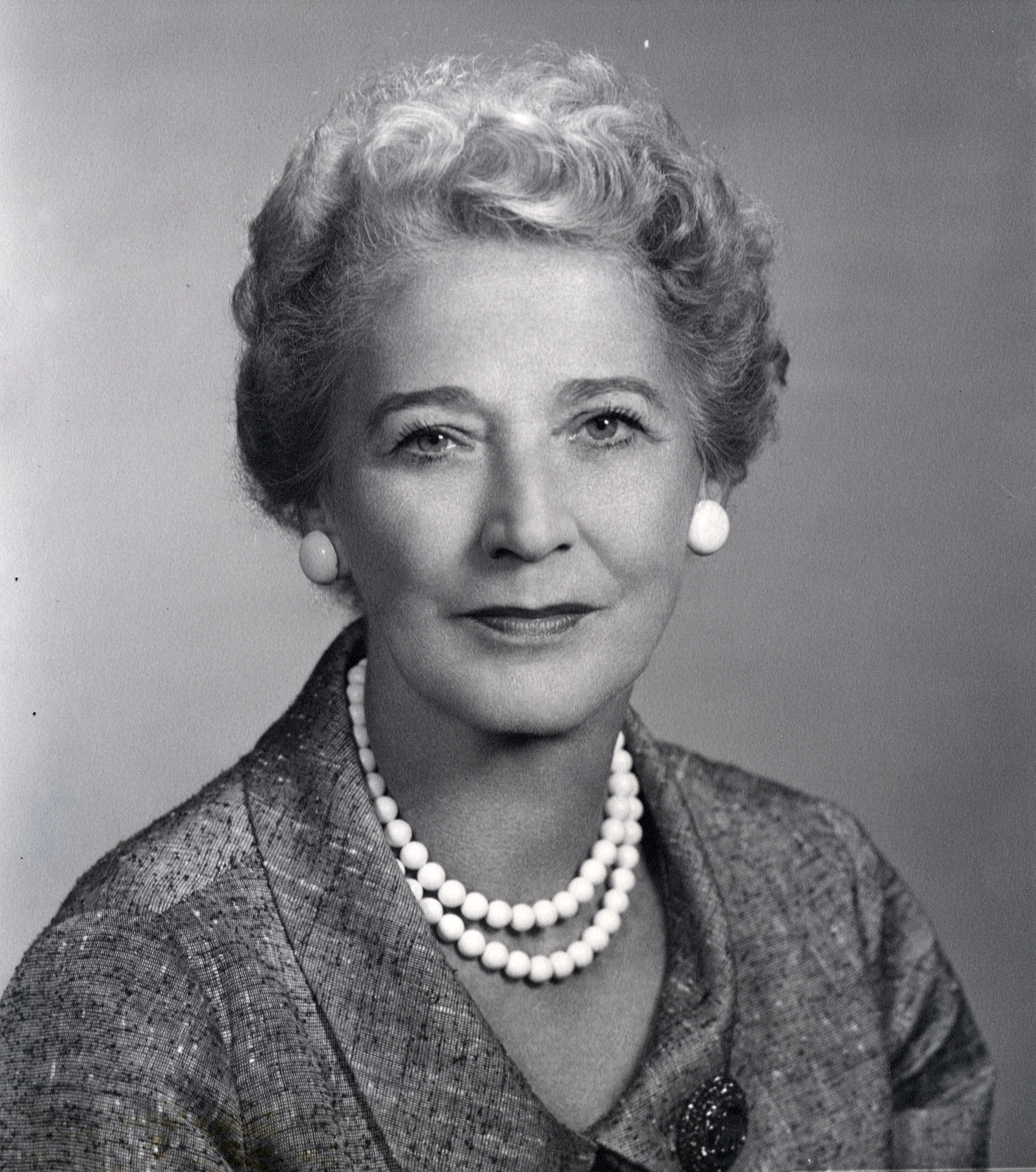

Member of the U.S. House of Representatives from New York's 38th district
- In office January 3, 1959 – January 3, 1963
- Preceded by: Kenneth Keating
- Succeeded by: Frank Horton (redistricting)

President of the National Federation of Republican Women
- In office 1941–1942
- Preceded by: Joyce Porter Arneill
- Succeeded by: Marie Suthers

Personal details
- Born: July 8, 1901 Chicago, Illinois, U.S.
- Died: May 1, 1963 (aged 61) Rochester, New York, U.S.
- Party: Republican
- Spouse: Charles William Weis Jr.
- Children: 3

Jessica "Judy" McCullough Weis (July 8, 1901 – May 1, 1963) was a two-term Republican member of the United States House of Representatives from Rochester, New York.

Weis was born in Chicago, the daughter of Charles H. McCullough Jr. and Jessie Martin McCullough. Her father was president of the Lackawanna Steel Company in Lackawanna, New York. She was educated at the Franklin School in Buffalo, at Miss Wright's School in Bryn Mawr, Pennsylvania and at Madame Rieffel's French School in New York City. In 1921 she married Charles William Weis Jr. of Rochester, who became president of the Stecher Traung Lithographic Company. They had three children.

As a young woman, Weis worked as a volunteer for the Red Cross, the Junior League, and other charitable organizations. In 1923 she founded the Chatterbox Club, a women's social club. Weis first became active in politics during the 1936 election campaign of Alf Landon, when she organized statewide road caravans to support his election. She held various posts in the local, state, and national Republican Party. She was vice chairman of the Monroe County Republican Committee from 1937 until 1952. She was also a member of the Republican National Committee from 1944 until 1963.

Weis served as the first vice president of the newly founded National Federation of Republican Women and served as its president in 1941. She was a delegate at large to the 1940, 1944, 1948, 1952 and 1956 Republican National Conventions. In 1948 Weis seconded the nomination of Thomas E. Dewey for president, the first woman to do so. She went on to work as associate campaign manager for the Republican Party in the 1948 election.

In 1952 Weis was a member of the caucus that helped Dwight D. Eisenhower select a running mate, an experience she described in an essay she contributed to the book, Politics USA. In 1953, President Eisenhower appointed her to the National Defence Advisory Council, she was re-appointed to this post until her resignation in 1958. She was also an appointee to the Inter-American Commission of Women. In 1956, she was the planning chair of the Republican National Convention in San Francisco.

When Kenneth Keating vacated his house seat to run for the US Senate, Weis was elected to Congress from New York's the 38th District. She was reelected in 1960, and served from January 3, 1959 until January 3, 1963. She served on the Committees on Governmental Operations, District of Columbia, and the newly formed Committee on Science and Astronautics. In 1961 Weis supported the Equal Rights Amendment and the Equal Pay Act.

Weis declined to run for a third term when she was diagnosed with cancer. She died in Rochester, New York, age 61, and was interred at Mount Hope Cemetery. Her papers are housed at Harvard University's Schlesinger Library.

== See also ==
- Women in the United States House of Representatives

U.S. House of Representatives
Preceded by Kenneth Keating	Member of the U.S. House of Representatives from New York's 38th congressional district 1959–1963	Succeeded by Charles Goodell
