= Marie H. Suthers =

American politician and educator (1895–1983)

President of the National Federation of Republican Women
- In office 1943–1946
- Preceded by: Judy Weis
- Succeeded by: Peggy Green

Personal details
- Born: March 12, 1895 Chicago, Illinois, U.S.
- Died: February 9, 1983 (aged 87) Evergreen Park, Illinois, U.S.
- Party: Republican
- Profession: Educator

Marie Wikoff (née Hesse) Suthers (March 12, 1895 – February 9, 1983) was an American politician and educator.

Born in Chicago, Illinois, Suthers lived in the Beverly neighborhood in Chicago. Suthers received her bachelor's degree from Chicago State University and taught adult education in the Chicago public schools system. She was involved with the Republican Party. Suthers served in the Illinois House of Representatives from 1951 to 1953. She then served on the Chicago Board of Elections from 1952 until 1981. Suthers died at the Little Company of Mary Hospital in Evergreen Park, Illinois.
