= 1939 New York state election =

- November 7, 1939

The 1939 New York state election was held on November 7, 1939, to elect the Chief Judge of the New York Court of Appeals. Besides, an amendment to the State Constitution proposed to legalize Parimutuel betting on horse-race tracks, and was accepted.

== History ==
In 1939, there was only one state officer to be elected statewide: The Chief Judge of the Court of Appeals, to succeed Frederick E. Crane, who would reach the constitutional age limit at the end of the year.

The revised State Constitution of 1938, ratified by the electorate the previous year, increased the term in the New York State Assembly to two years, so that there were no assembly elections anymore in odd-numbered years.

The Democratic State Committee met on September 27, and nominated associate judge Irving Lehman for Chief Judge.

The American Labor State Committee met on September 30 and endorsed the Democratic nominee Irving Lehman.

The Republican State Committee met on October 3, and endorsed the Democratic and American Labor nominee Irving Lehman.

== Result ==
Judge Irving Lehman was elected unopposed.

1939 state election result
Office	Republican ticket		Democratic ticket		American Labor ticket	
Chief Judge	Irving Lehman	1,946,481	Irving Lehman	1,512,650	Irving Lehman	240,302

== See also ==
- New York state elections

== Sources ==
- Official result: 1,225,495 Approved Pari-Mutuel in NYT on December 10, 1939 (subscription required)

New York Red Book 1940
