= Robert Bentley Suthers =

Robert Bentley Suthers (1870 – 1950) was a Socialist journalist who wrote several books, including an important text in favour of municipal socialism called Mind your own business: the case for municipal management.

R. B. Suthers was born in 1870 in Manchester and attended Manchester Grammar School where in 1883, when he was in second form, he was awarded the second prize for Classics. In 1892 he was living at 57 Meadow Street in Moss Side and in 1893, when he was 22, he was on the list of contributors to the Cradley Chainmakers strike fund as the cashier for the Clarion, a socialist newspaper which had been founded the previous year. The Clarion was registered on the 11 October 1984 as a limited company, and as a member of staff Suthers bought a £1 share, as did the other staff. It was a popular paper, and as a result in 1895 moved from a small office in Manchester to Fleet Street, London. In 1899, Suthers became a writer for The Clarion and wrote the "Whatnot" column for many years. He also wrote a number of pamphlets for the newspaper, which published his books.

In December 1901, the Clarion announced the publication of a new book by Suthers called "Municipal Socialism".

In a widely quoted phrase, Suthers wrote as follows about Glasgow, showing that the city was the leading adopter of municipal institutions:

Think, for instance, of the citizen of Glasgow, who is generally considered to be the richest in municipal institutions in the Kingdom.

A citizen of Glasgow may live in a municipal house. He may walk along the municipal street, or ride on the municipal tramcar, and watch the municipal dust-cart collecting the refuse, which is used to fertilise the municipal farm. Then he may turn into the municipal market, buy a steak from an animal killed in the municipal slaughterhouse, and cook it by municipal gas on a municipal gas stove. For his recreation he has the choice of municipal libraries, municipal art galleries, and municipal music in the municipal parks. Should he fall ill he can ring up his doctor through the municipal telephone, or he may be taken to the municipal hospital on the municipal ambulance by a municipal policeman. Should he be so unfortunate as to get on fire, he will be put out by a municipal fireman using municipal water, after which he will perhaps forego the enjoyment of a municipal bath, though he may find it necessary to buy a new suit in the municipal old clothes market.

In the midst of all this municipal happiness he will probably fall down dead with astonishment when he learns that Glasgow has no municipal cemetery.

This text appears in a number of Suthers publications on municipal socialism or municipal management, and in several newspapers of the time. It is also quoted in a number of books including T. C. Smout's influential "Century of the Scottish People", but has been incorrectly cited since 1907, when R. P. Porter gave the first mis-attribution, and also miss-spelt the presumed author of the quotation. Robert Porter was the Director of the Eleventh U. S. Census, who strongly opposed municipal trading. George Bernard Shaw and Robert Porter were commissioned to write a ‘Pro and Con’ edition on Municipal Trading in 1903 but the publishing house went bankrupt before the book could be published. Shaw subsequently published a pro-municipal trading text in 1904.

This Wikipedia entry allows Suther's authorship to be correctly acknowledged.

In 1925 Suthers left the Clarion and became a contributor to the Daily Herald.

Further details of his life can be inferred from the 1911 UK census and the military records of his son, Robert Eric Suthers. Robert and Alice's first son, Robert Eric Suthers, was born at East Finchley, London on the 15 January 1899 and their second son was born on 15 June 1901. R. E. Suthers was killed at the age of 19, in the First Battle of the Aisne during the First World War on 2 August 1918.

Suthers engaged in a long philosophical debate regarding the nature of free will with G.K Chesterton and the debate would be referenced in Chesterton's book Orthodoxy.

== Bibliography ==
=== Books ===
- 1901 - A Man, A Woman, and A Dog
- 1905 - Mind your own business: the case for municipal management.
- 1907 - Jack's Wife
- 1904 - The Clarion Birthday Book, compiled by H. Beswick and R. B. Suthers
- 1906 - My Right To Work
- 1910 - Free Trade Delusions

=== Pamphlets ===
- 1904 - John Bull and Doctor Socialism (no. 1).
- 1908 - John Bull and Doctor Protection
- 1909 - Common objections to socialism answered
