= Mary Jo Arndt =

American political activist

President of the National Federation of Republican Women
- In office 1998–1999
- Preceded by: Marilyn Thayer
- Succeeded by: Marian Miller

Personal details
- Born: Mary Jo Larsen; September 18, 1933; Chicago, Illinois, U.S.
- Died: September 24, 2011 (aged 78)

Mary Jo Arndt (née Larsen; September 18, 1933 – September 24, 2011) was an American activist and civic leader involved in Republican politics. She was president of the Illinois Federation of Republican Women and in 1982, she was elected to the Illinois Republican Committee representing the 6th congressional district. Between 1998 and 1999, she was president of the National Federation of Republican Women. She was described by the Chicago Tribune as "arguably the state's most influential Republican woman operative".

== Early life ==
Arndt was born Mary Jo Larsen on September 18, 1933, in Chicago, Illinois. She was the only child of Holger Hans Larsen, a home builder who co-founded the John Ericsson Republican League of Du Page County, and Georgia E. Larsen (née Weede), a volunteer with the Lombard Republican Women's Organization. The family relocated first to Elgin and then to Lombard, Illinois. She attended Glenbard West High School before receiving a bachelor's of science degree in teaching from Northern Illinois University in 1955, where she served as one of the first female student body presidents. She met Paul W. Arndt, a veterinary student from DeKalb, through a mutual friend while he was passing through Lombard. The couple married in 1956 at the Maple Street Chapel. They had three daughters: Georgianne, Kristi and Kerri.

Arndt worked as a fourth and fifth grade teacher at Lincoln Elementary School in Villa Park, before she and her husband founded the Lombard Veterinary Hospital in 1959. She was involved with local activism, helping with the construction of the Bicentennial Lombard Log Cabin in Sunset Park, serving as a member of the women's board of the Lincoln Park Zoological Society, and assisting with the parent-teacher association and as a local Girl Scout leader while her daughters were growing up. Arndt lobbied for the University of Illinois College of Veterinary Medicine and served on the board of overseers for the Illinois Institute of Technology.

== Political career ==
Arndt served as a Young Republican volunteer for Barry Goldwater's 1964 presidential campaign. She first joined the York Township Republicans during the early 1970s, defeating the judge John J. Bowman for the seat. She served as the Illinois publicity chairwoman for the National Republican Women's Conference in Washington, D.C., in 1969 and as the precinct committeewoman for DuPage County. She joined the Illinois Federation of Republican Women, serving as a member from 1970 to 1974, as first vice-president from 1975 to 1976 and as the president from 1977 to 1981. She was a member of the executive committee for Republican Women in Power from 1971 to 1976, a member of the advisory committee for the State Superintendent for Public Instruction from 1974 to 1978 and a member of the 14th congressional senators advisory committee from 1975 to 1982.

Arndt was elected to the Illinois Republican Committee in 1982 as the only woman on the twenty-two person commission, representing the 6th congressional district. She was appointed by President Ronald Reagan to the President's Commission on White House Fellowships on August 8, 1987, to succeed LeGree Silva Daniels. She served as the vice president of the National Federation of Republican Women from 1986 to 1987 and as the president from 1998 to 1999. She then founded the Illinois Republican Women's Roundtable in 1989 and the Illinois Lincoln Excellence in Public Service Series, which provides scholarships to women who chose to study government and politics. In 1990, she was described by the Chicago Tribune as "arguably the state's most influential Republican woman operative". She was appointed by President George H. W. Bush to serve as an observer for the 1990 Romanian general election. She then travelled to Taiwan in 1991 as a representative for a political educational exchange.

== Later life and honors ==
Arndt died on September 24, 2011, from peritoneal cancer. She was named as the Outstanding Woman Leader in Government and Politics by the West Suburban YWCA in 1988 and as a Power Personality by Today's Chicago Woman magazine in 1990. Arndt was honored for her service by HR 1563, a resolution proposed by Representative Tom Cross and passed by the Illinois General Assembly on November 19, 2008.
