= Mary Jo Bole =

American sculptor, printmaker, and artist-bookmaker

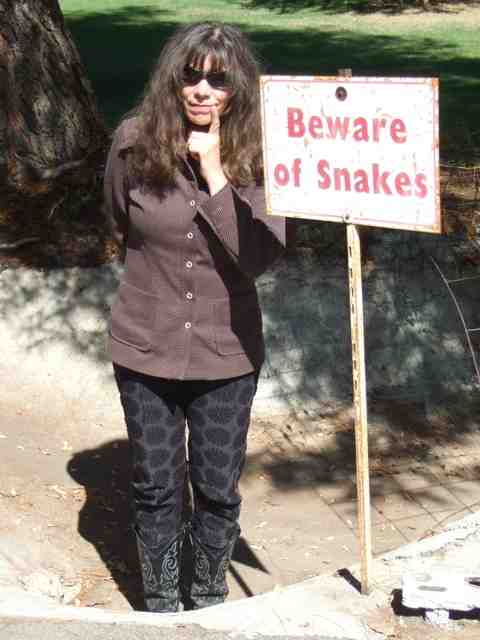
- Bole in 2013
- Born: March 1, 1956 (age 69); Cleveland, Ohio
- Occupations: sculptor, printmaker, and artist-bookmaker

Mary Jo Bole (born March 1, 1956, in Cleveland, Ohio), US, is a sculptor, printmaker, and artist-bookmaker who lives and works in Columbus. Bole has exhibited her works in the United States and Europe. She was a professor of art at Ohio State University.

== Career ==
In 2013, Bole completed Combing Columbus: Photogenic Drawings for the Bicentennial, a book which was commissioned by "Finding Time: Columbus Public Art 2012" to commemorate the city's heritage as part of its bicentennial celebration. "The book...contains dozens of [Bole's] drawings and paintings...It's a little like walking through a jumbled museum--you never know what you're going to find." Bole's projects have received grants and commissions from such organizations as The Andy Warhol Foundation for the Visual Arts, the National Endowment for the Arts, the Ohio Arts Council, the Greater Columbus Arts Council, and the Headlands Center for the Arts in Sausalito, California.

Bole's artworks are in a number of collections including the Detroit Art Institute, Shiffler Collection, The Pushkin Museum in Moscow, the John Michael Kohler Arts Center (Sheboygan, Wisconsin), the National City Bank, and the Gustavsberg Factory Collection, Stockholm, as well as in several significant private collections.

== Artist books ==
Boles has produced seven artist's books, some of which are included in the collections of the Museum of Modern Art, New York, and the Getty Museum, Los Angeles. ..."MJ's Daily Spy History is the title of a gemlike book produced during Mary Jo Bole's Dresden residency. Opening it, one is immediately transported to a flea market on a sunny Saturday morning. And like a fleamarket, it presents a kaleidoscopic array of artifacts from everyday life and experience of its creator."

Bole has also created cover art for five album recordings, including two for Cheater Slicks: Your Last Record, and Refried Dreams, both produced by The Red Label in Los Angeles, and for Pram, Owl Service, produced by Domino Recording Label, London.

== Exhibitions ==
Bole worked in Dresden, Germany for three months as part of The Artist-in-Residence Exchange Program, sponsored in 2004 by the GCAC. In a 2008 book about the program and Bole's participation, curator Susanne Altmann writes

In her artistic work, Mary Jo Bole clearly feels a commitment to this fascination with unusual artifacts in unusual contexts." Altmann continues, "Again and again, death is the dominant theme in Mary Jo Bole's work--often benefitting from the way she brings it closer to humor and storytelling...Mary Jo Bole displays her marked ability to work with opulent ornament and autobiographical fragments on a universal level."

Art critic Donald Kuspit writes in the Material Speculations catalogue,

[Bole] collects artifacts and images associated with death, and makes works that return to childhood--a very personal childhood. It is as though she wants to encompass the beginning and end of life--her life which began in the family and will end in a cemetery of relatives. Her subject is not so much nature, although that is there, ever present, threatening, yet gently embracing as the site-specific Nature Takes Over, 1999 indicates, as human nature, more particularly, her own nature, as The Stuff of Self-Indulgence, 1990 suggests."

James Voorhies writes of Bole's work, Purge Incomplete was included in a 2009 project at the Eastern State Penitentiary in Philadelphia, Pennsylvania.

"Today, Eastern State Penitentiary is a historic landmark and museum with site-specific works by contemporary artists. Mary Jo Bole's installation "Purge Incomplete" ...investigates the intersections of architecture, psychology, and human behavior with particular attention to the prison's plumbing."

Boles' My Yard 1993, The Wexner Center for the Arts, at The Ohio State University, Columbus, Ohio was described in the Columbus Dispatch as "Meditation on death rich in gentle universal symbols," by Lesley Constable. Constable observes: "The exhibition 'My Yard' was inspired by the artists' lifelong fascination with cemeteries, probably triggered, Bole surmises, from having grown up across from Lakeview Cemetery in Cleveland." Included in the exhibition Contemporary American Ceramics at the Newport Harbor Art Museum (now the Orange County Art Museum) in 1985, "Mary Jo Bole celebrates her love for the city of Cleveland by making raucous, anthropoidal, boxy skyscrapers and factories. Their witty, boisterous swagger is her homage to sooty industrial Midwestern cities such as Cleveland for which she feels we should all have greater appreciation." Karen McCready, the curator, continues in the exhibition catalog: "Her distinctive wall reliefs and free-standing pieces characterize Cleveland as a city of grimy elegance."

A solo exhibition, "Tombs and Toilets," in Los Angeles at Mount Saint Mary's College was scheduled to open in February 2014, with an exhibition catalogue published by the college. Her work is included in "Wounded Home", a collaborative installation reflecting on the Civil War, at the Lloyd Library and Museum, Cincinnati, Ohio; the exhibition runs through January 2014. In October 2013, a film by Mary Jo Bole and Jerry Dannemiller, That Sweet Scioto River Water screened in conjunction with Blues for Smoke, an exhibition at the Wexner Center, Columbus, Ohio, that was originated by MOCA in Los Angeles.

== Archive ==
Her journals and papers, the Mary Jo Bole Collection, are in the rare books and manuscripts collection in the William Oxley Thompson Library at Ohio State University.

== Education ==
- M.F.A. New York State College of Ceramics at Alfred University, Alfred, New York
- B.F.A. Cum Laude, University of Michigan, Ann Arbor, Michigan

== Artist books ==
- Bole, Mary Jo. Combing Columbus: Photogenic Drawings for the Bicentennial, commissioned and published by "Finding Time: Columbus Public Art 2012." (Edition of 1100). 2013.
- Bole, Mary Jo. Toilet Worship, published by Logan Elm Press, The Ohio State University Libraries, Columbus, Ohio. (Edition 140). 2012.
- Bole, Mary Jo. MJ's Daily Spy History, published by Knust Press, Nijmegen, The Netherlands (Edition 500). 2005.
- Bole, Mary Jo. Thankful Subjects, published by Knust Press, Nijmegen, The Netherlands (Edition 230). 1997.
- Bole, Mary Jo and Berry von Boekel (with 30 invited artists), Splitting Pictures, Knust Press, Nijmegen, The Netherlands (Edition 350). 1997.
- Bole, Mary Jo, Rust Rest in collaboration with artists Birdie Thaler and Berry Van Boekel, Knust Press, Nijmegen, The Netherlands, 1996.

== Solo exhibitions, selected ==
- Purge Incomplete, Eastern State Penitentiary, Philadelphia, PA, 2009
- Terse Tender, Feinkunst Kruger Gallery, Hamburg, Germany, 2006
- Dear Little Twists of Fate, Seigfred Hall, Ohio University, Athens, Ohio, 2002
- Mary's Monuments, Europees Keramisch Werkcentrum, The Netherlands, 1994
- My Yard installation, The Wexner Center for the Visual Arts, The Ohio State University, Columbus, Ohio, 1993
- Mary Jo Bole, Gallerija Langas, Vilnius, Lithuania, 1992

== Group exhibitions, selected ==
- Evolution/Impact, The Riffe Center, Columbus, Ohio. 2007.
- Bad Drawing: Mistaken, Misbehaving, Malevolent, Awful, DAAP Galleries, College of Design, Architecture, Art and Planning University of Cincinnati, Cincinnati, Ohio. 2006.
- Reimagining the Distaff ToolKit, a traveling exhibition beginning at the Bennington Museum, Bennington, Vermont, curated by Rickie Solinger, 2010–2013.
- Object/Imprint, Urban Space, Columbus, Ohio. 2011.
- Toilet Concealment, artists installation "Rooms to Let," Columbus, Ohio. 2012.
- Wounded Home, a collaborative installation in a home in Cincinnati, Ohio. 2013.

== Grants and fellowships ==
- The Eastern State Penitentiary Historic Site, Project Development Grant, Philadelphia, Pennsylvania, 2007
- The Ohio Arts Council, Columbus, Ohio, individual fellowships and project grants 2007, 2004, 2000, 1989, 1985, 1984, 1980
- The Greater Columbus Arts Council, Individual Fellowship Grant, Columbus, Ohio, 2002
- Andy Warhol Foundation Grant (through Woman's Studio Workshop), Rosedale, New York, 1999

== Artist in residence, selected ==
- J. M. Kohler Arts Center, artist in industry program, Kohler factory, Kohler, Wisconsin, 2008, 1988/89
- Pilchuck Glass School, Stanwood, Washington, 2007
- Knust Press, Nijmegen, The Netherlands, 2005, 1998, 1996
- Dresden, Germany, artist exchange program sponsored by the Greater Columbus Arts Council, Columbus, Ohio, 2004
- Headlands Center for the Arts, Sausalito, California, sponsored by The Ohio Arts Council, 2002
- Gustavsberg Factory, Stockholm, Sweden, 2000
- Women's Studio Workshop, Rosendale, New York 1999
- Europees Keramisch Werkcentrum 'S-Hertogenbosch, The Netherlands, 1993
- Jlesia Bone China Factory, Kaunas, Lithuania, 1992

== Guest lectures/visiting artist, selected ==
- Art Institute of Chicago, Chicago, Illinois, 2010, 1995, 1986
- Rhode Island School of Design, Providence, Rhode Island, 2009, 1985
- Tyler School of Art, Philadelphia, Pennsylvania, 2009
- Penn State University, State College, Pennsylvania, 2009
- University of Washington, Seattle, Washington, 2005
- University of California, Berkeley, California and University of California, Davis, California 2002
- California College of Arts and Crafts, Oakland, California, 2002
- Cranbrook Academy, Bloomfield Hills, Michigan, 2001
- Philadelphia Museum of Art, Philadelphia, Pennsylvania, 1994
- Art Academy, Tilburg, The Netherlands, 1993

== Teaching experience ==
Professor, Department of Art, The Ohio State University, Columbus, Ohio (1990–2011)
