= National Federation of Republican Women =

American political action group

- Abbreviation: NFRW
- Formation: 1938; 88 years ago
- Founders: Joyce Porter Arneill, Marion Martin
- Founded at: Chicago, Illinois, United States
- Type: Women's wing
- Purpose: Promote Republican values, recruit and elect Republican candidates, advance women in politics
- Headquarters: Alexandria, Virginia, United States
- Members: Tens of thousands
- President: Julie Harris
- Parent organization: Republican Party
- Affiliations: Republican Party
- Website: www.nfrw.org
- Formerly called: National Federation of Women's Republican Clubs

The National Federation of Republican Women (NFRW) is a political action committee (PAC) that serves as the women's wing of the Republican Party in the United States. It was founded in 1938 by Marion Martin (1901–1987), who was the assistant chair of the Republican National Committee (RNC). The NFRW is recognized as one of the largest grassroots political organizations in the country, with thousands of members spread across local clubs nationwide. According to the NFRW, its mission is to "empower women from all backgrounds in the political process and provide a forum for women to serve as leaders in political, government, and civic arenas."

== History ==
=== Background ===
Before women were granted the right to vote in the United States, local Republican women's clubs were already being established. The oldest known Republican women's club was founded in Salt Lake City, Utah, in 1899. These clubs were formed for various reasons, ranging from promoting the Republican Party to advocating for changes in party policies, endorsing candidates, and at times, protesting the activities of local Republican Party organizations.

=== Foundation ===
In 1937, Marion Martin, the newly appointed assistant chairman of the Republican National Committee (RNC), undertook a nationwide assessment of Republican women's organizations. Her findings revealed a lack of cohesion among these groups, with many clubs operating independently and without unified goals. Martin was particularly concerned about their inconsistent support for the Republican Party and the diverse agendas of these organizations, which often included nonpartisan activities or support for candidates outside the Republican fold.

To address these issues, Martin proposed the formation of a centralized national organization. In December 1937, after much debate and a committee vote, the National Federation of Women's Republican Clubs (NFWRC) was established as an auxiliary to the RNC. The Federation was designed to standardize the educational efforts of women's clubs and promote loyalty to the Republican Party.

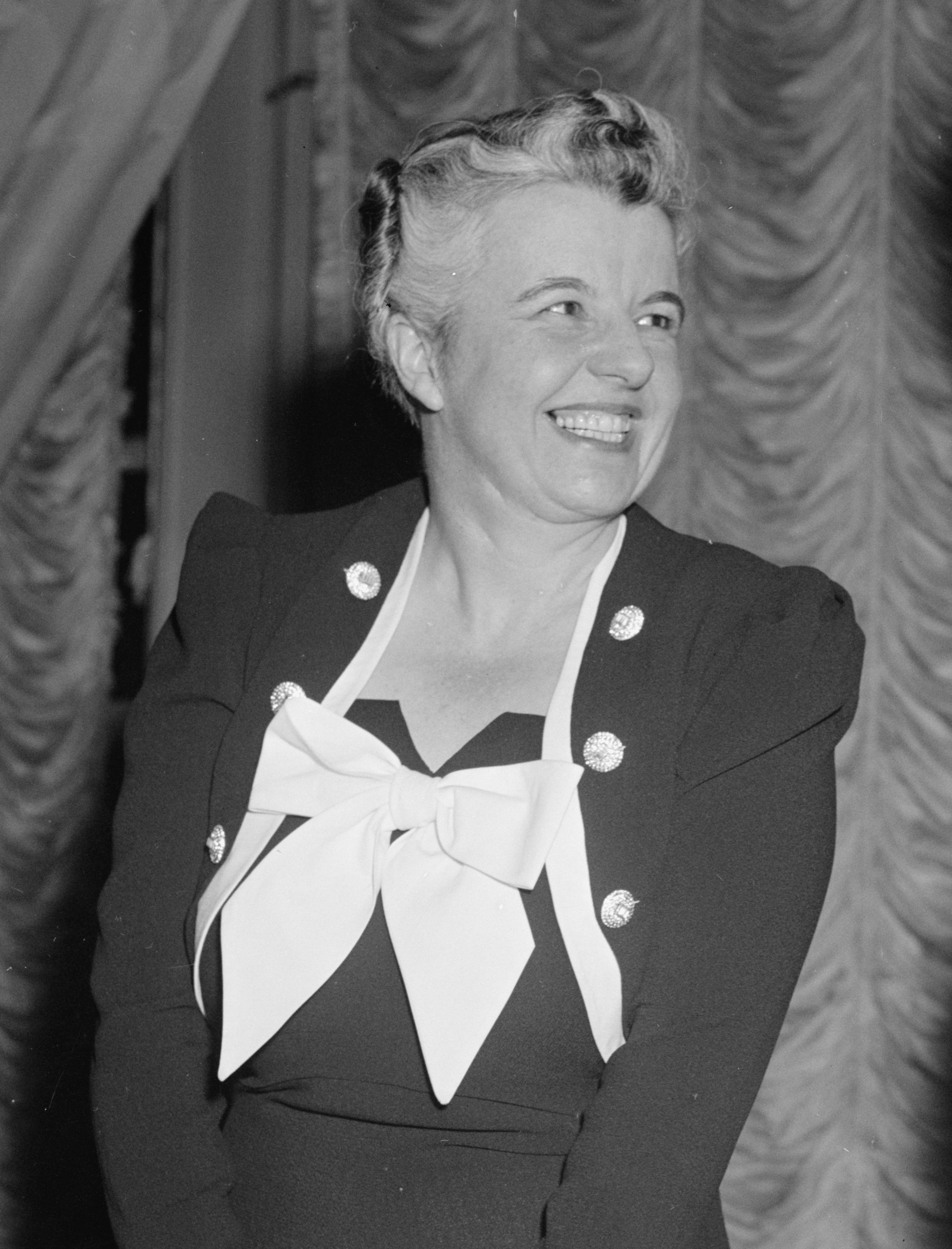
Martin in 1939

The first meeting was held in September 1938 at the Palmer House in Chicago, representing 85 clubs and 95,000 women. Joyce Porter Arneill, from Colorado, was chosen as the Federation's first president, though Martin retained significant influence as its executive director. Under Martin's leadership, the Federation emphasized political education through study materials distributed to clubs nationwide, aiming to create a disciplined network of informed Republican women.

During World War II, the Federation shifted its focus away from overtly partisan activities as many women joined the workforce to support the war effort. The organization refrained from taking stances on divisive issues such as isolationism, opting instead to provide nonpartisan political education. This decision faced criticism but was intended to maintain the Federation's integrity and focus on long-term political engagement.

The NFRW experienced significant growth in its early years. By September 1, 1943, the organization comprised 23 statewide federations and 98 individual clubs from 16 states. In January 1953, the organization's name was officially changed to the National Federation of Republican Women, reflecting its expanded national presence.

=== Farrington presidency ===
In 1948, Elizabeth P. Farrington succeeded Marion Martin as president of the NFRW and strategically broadened the organization's membership by reaching out to Southern women and African-American members. Unlike Martin, who focused on general party loyalty, Farrington prioritized gender-specific concerns that resonated with women across different demographics, thereby uniting them under the Republican banner. To enhance the Federation's independence, she successfully moved it out from under the financial oversight of the RNC, granting the organization the ability to select its own leadership and manage its budget autonomously.

Farrington also infused the NFRW's activities with religious symbolism and a staunch anti-communist stance, which significantly boosted its appeal during the Cold War era. Her leadership not only diversified the Federation's membership but also drove it to unprecedented growth, with membership expanding to half a million women by the early 1950. The NFRW leveraged the power of emerging media during the Eisenhower administration, particularly through television. The organization innovatively conducted political events in private homes, such as the "Operation Coffee Cup" gatherings, where Republican candidates engaged directly with voters in an intimate, informal setting. This strategy effectively shifted political discourse from public arenas to the domestic sphere, making politics more accessible to women in their own homes. By the 1950s, the NFRW had capitalized on these efforts to foster grassroots involvement, which contributed significantly to public education on Republican principles. The organization was widely praised for its volunteers' dedication to community service and their altruistic commitment to educating the public on party ideals.

=== Post-Cold War ===
The early 1990s period was marked by a growing recognition of the "gender gap" in voter behavior, where women showed distinct political preferences compared to men. The NFRW, alongside other groups, actively supported female candidates and worked to promote them in leadership positions within the party; however, the Republican Party faced internal challenges, particularly concerning women's rights issues like abortion. While efforts were made to include women in leadership roles and candidate training programs, the party's increasingly conservative platform risked alienating moderate women. Despite these ideological tensions, the NFRW remained committed to enhancing feminine participation in politics.

During the 1992 elections, often referred to as the "Year of the American Woman in Politics", the NFRW sought to elevate the visibility of female Republican candidates. However, the party struggled to fully showcase its female candidates at the 1992 convention, instead emphasizing traditional family values. The efforts of the NFRW during this era reflected a broader movement to strengthen the influence of ladies within the party, despite the challenges posed by the party's shifting ideological landscape.

== Organization ==
=== Structure ===
The NFRW is structured across national, state, and local levels, with specialized programs aimed at mobilizing Republican women and supporting their participation in politics. The organization conducts training programs to recruit, train, and elect Republican women candidates. It also hosts a biennial convention where members convene to network, vote, and set future goals for the organization. The NFRW functions independently from the Republican Party, both financially and organizationally. As a registered political action committee, it has the authority to make financial contributions to political candidates. For example, in 2004, the NFRW contributed $27,000 to Republican candidates for federal offices, and in 2008, it contributed $10,506; however, the organization did not make any financial contributions during the 2014 and 2016 election cycles.

=== Mission ===
According to the NFRW, its mission is the following:

- The mission of the NFRW is to mobilize and empower Republican women across the United States to actively participate in the political process.
- This includes supporting local, state, and federal campaigns, promoting conservative values, and building leadership within communities.
- The organization is dedicated to recruiting and electing Republican candidates, educating the public, informing the media, and fostering engagement in civic responsibilities.
- Founded in 1938, the NFRW focuses on strengthening the Republican Party through grassroots involvement and volunteer efforts, contributing significantly to political outreach and campaign activities.

=== Membership ===
Women can join the NFRW through local clubs or via a national at-large membership, which also includes state and national membership. State federations operate independently but must align their bylaws with those of the NFRW. Currently, the organization comprises more than 1,600 local clubs across all 50 states, the District of Columbia, and U.S. territories. Members at the local, state, and national levels focus on recruiting and supporting Republican candidates, advocating for party policies, and promoting women's involvement in the political process. The NFRW plays a key role in organizing Republican women and advancing the party's objectives throughout the United States.

== Partnership ==
One of the NFRW's notable partnerships involved collaboration with organizations like RENEW (Republican Network to Elect Women) and the WISH List. These groups collectively organized training sessions to prepare Republican women, helping them navigate the political landscape and develop the skills necessary for successful candidacies.

== Seal ==
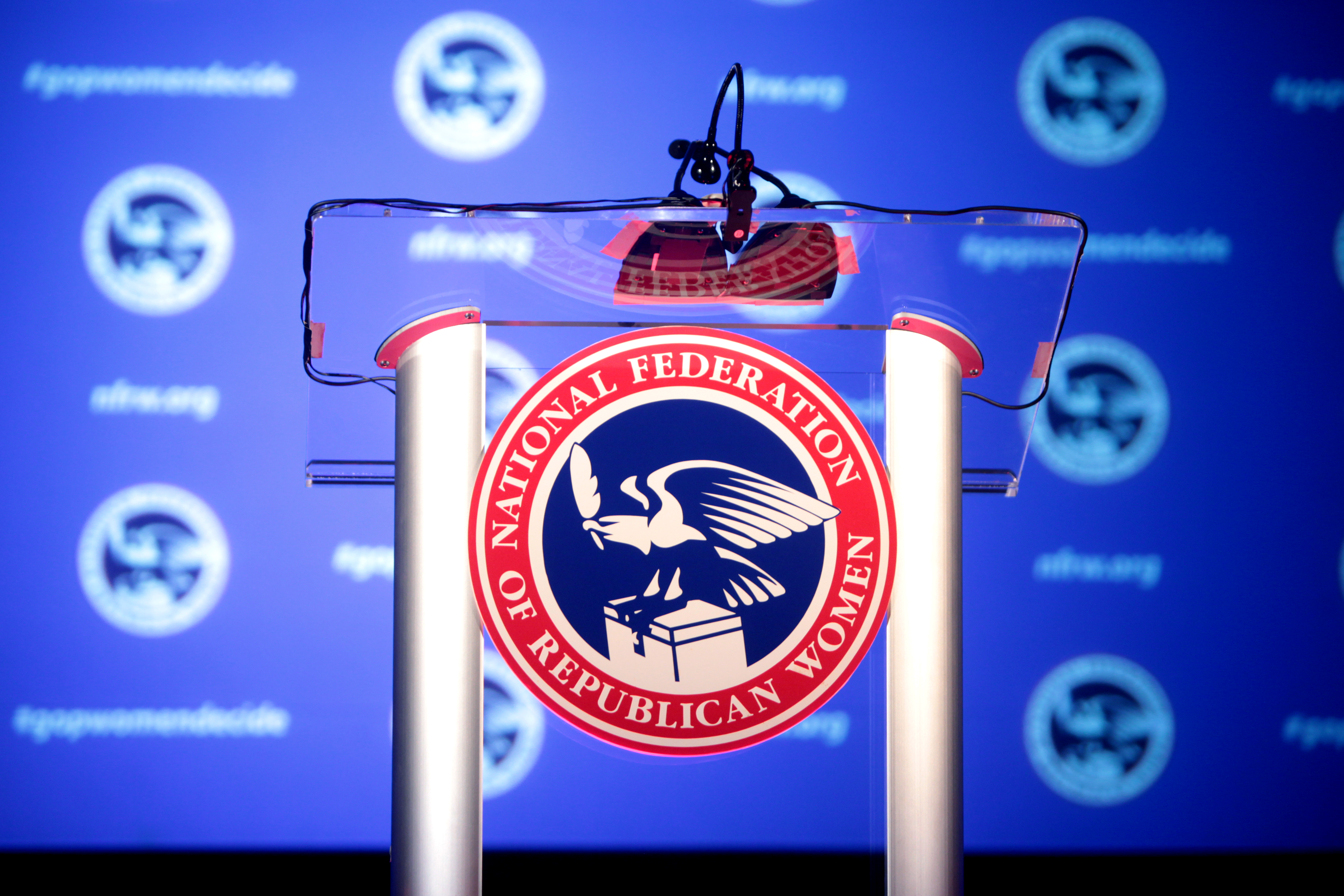
NFRW podium in 2015

The seal of the National Federation of Republican Women (NFRW) is a registered trademark that reflects the organization's focus on the democratic process. It features an American Eagle holding a quill pen and standing beside a ballot box, symbolizing the protection of voting rights and electoral integrity. Adopted at the NFRW's biennial convention in 1944, the seal draws inspiration from the Great Seal of the United States. The quill pen represents the influence of written words, particularly as seen in the Declaration of Independence and the U.S. Constitution.

== Leadership ==
Presidents of the National Federation of Republican Women
No.	Name	State	Term start	Term end
1	Joyce Arneill	Colorado	1938	1940
2	Judy Weis	New York	1941	1942
3	Marie Suthers	Illinois	1943	1946
4	Peggy Green	Massachusetts	1947	1948
5	Elizabeth Farrington	Hawaii	1949	1952
6	Nora Kearns	Pennsylvania	1953	1956
7	Mary Catherine Gibson	Michigan	1957	1960
8	Ruth Parks	Colorado	1961	1962
9	Dorothy Andrews Elston Kabis	Delaware	1963	1967
10	Gladys O'Donnell	California	1968	1971
11	Constance Dean Armitage	South Carolina	1972	1975
12	Patricia Hutar	Illinois	1976	1977
13	Betty Green Heitman	Louisiana	1978	1980
14	Betty Rendel	Indiana	1981	1985
15	Judy Hughes	Colorado	1986	1989
16	Huda Jones	Kentucky	1990	1993
17	Charlotte Mousel	California	1994	1995
18	Marilyn Thayer	Louisiana	1996	1997
19	Mary Jo Arndt	Illinois	1998	1999
20	Marian Miller	Indiana	2000	2001
21	Heidi Smith	Nevada	2002	2003
22	Dianne Thompson	Texas	2004	2005
23	Beverly Davis	Utah	2006	2007
24	Shirley Sadler	Ohio	2008	2009
25	Sue Lynch	Wisconsin	2010	2011
26	Rae Lynne Chornenky	Arizona	2012	2013
27	Kathy Brugger	California	2014	2015
28	Carrie Almond	Missouri	2016	2017
29	Jody Rushton	Texas	2018	2019
30	Ann Schockett	New York	2020	2021
31	Eileen Sobjack	Washington	2022	2023
32	Julie Harris	Arkansas	2024	Present

== See also ==
- Conservative variants of feminism
- Women in the United States House of Representatives
- Women in the United States Senate
- Women's political organizations in the United States
