= 1939 United States gubernatorial elections =

- November 7, 1939; April 16, 1940 (LA)

3 governorships
	Majority party	Minority party
Party	Democratic	Republican
Seats before	30	18
Seats after	30	18
Seat change	Steady	Steady
Seats up	3	0
Seats won	3	0
- Democratic hold

United States gubernatorial elections were held in 1939, in three states. Kentucky, Louisiana and Mississippi hold their gubernatorial elections in odd numbered years, every 4 years, preceding the United States presidential election year.

== Race summary ==
=== Results ===
State	Incumbent	Party	First elected	Result	Candidates
Kentucky	Keen Johnson	Democratic	1939 (Note: Johnson took office after his predecessor (Happy Chandler) resigned.)	Incumbent elected to full term.	✓ Keen Johnson (Democratic) 56.51%; King Swope (Republican) 43.49%
Louisiana (Held, 16 January and 20 February 1940)	Earl Long	Democratic	1939 (Note: Long took office after his predecessor (Richard W. Leche) resigned.)	Incumbent lost nomination to full term. New governor elected. Democratic hold.	✓ Sam H. Jones (Democratic) 99.40%; W. W. Tuttle (Republican) 0.60%
Mississippi	Hugh L. White	Democratic	1935	Incumbent term-limited. New governor elected. Democratic hold.	✓ Paul B. Johnson Sr. (Democratic); Unopposed
