= Arthur Kingsley Porter =

American art historian (1883–1933)

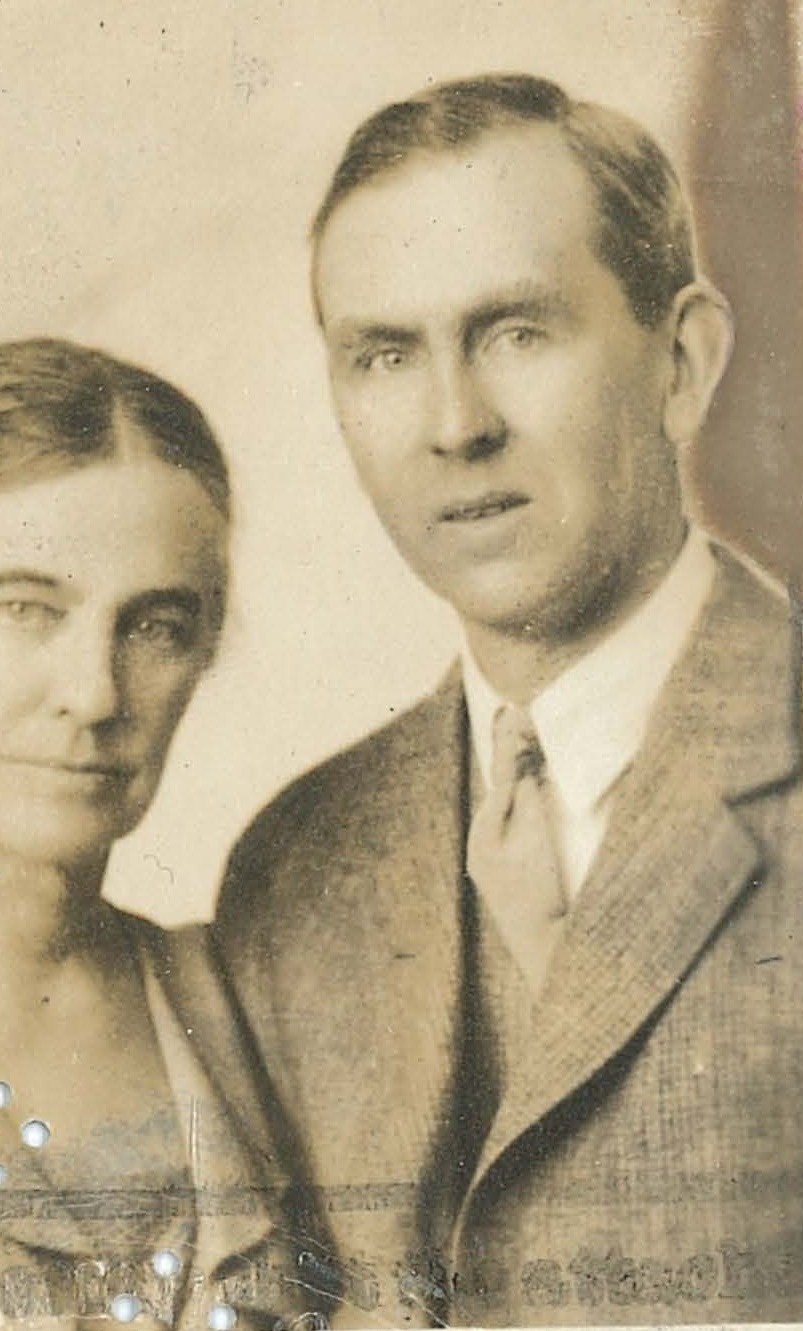
- Born: February 16, 1883; Darien, Connecticut, U.S.
- Died: July 8, 1933 (aged 50); Ireland
- Resting place: Woodland Cemetery, Stamford, Connecticut
- Education: Yale University; Columbia University
- Spouse: Lucy Bryant Wallace
- Parent(s): Timothy Hopkins Porter, Maria Louisa Hoyt

Arthur Kingsley Porter (1883–1933) was an American archaeologist, art historian, and medievalist. He was chair of Harvard University's art history department, and was the first American scholar of Romanesque architecture to achieve international recognition. Porter disappeared in 1933. His most significant scholarly contributions were his revolutionary studies and insights into the spread of Romanesque sculpture. His study of Lombard architecture also remains the first in its class. He left his Cambridge mansion, Elmwood, to Harvard University, where it has served as the official residence of Harvard's president since 1970.

== Early life ==
Porter was born on February 16, 1883, in Darien, Connecticut, the third son born to a wealthy family that also kept a residence in New York City. Porter prepared at the Browning School in New York City, alongside classmate John D. Rockefeller Jr. He then attended Yale University, as had his two older brothers, Louis Hopkins Porter and Blachley Hoyt Porter, his father, Timothy Hopkins Porter, several uncles and cousins. Porter had intended to study law. In 1904, while traveling in France, seeing Coutances cathedral inspired an interest in architecture. After graduating fourth in his class at Yale that year, he began a two-year study of architectural practice as a special student at Columbia University from 1904 to 1906.

== Family ==
Arthur Kingsley Porter was the son of Timothy Hopkins Porter, a banker, and Maria Louisa Hoyt, one of the first women to graduate from Vassar College. When his parents married in 1870 they merged two of Connecticut's oldest and most influential families, both groups of ancestors having arrived in Connecticut in the early 1600s.

In a biography of Porter's life, it was said of the Porters:

All the literature consulted converged on one main point: the Porters of Connecticut combined economic privilege with the finest pedigrees in education.

And of the Hoyt family:

The Hoyts of Connecticut had long established their position at the top of the social pecking order over centuries of diligent work and astute investment. In the late nineteenth century, the United States was admitting large numbers of Europeans who sought to make their fortune in the land of opportunity. It was therefore paramount to the survival of the oldest families that wealth was not the only requirement for admittance to the highest social strata. The Hoyts fulfilled all the criteria for being one of the most influential families in Connecticut, by possessing great wealth but also having an old family tradition that no amount of money could buy.

The Porter family was known for being understated and private with matters having to do with the extent of their wealth. A New York Times report in October 1924 listed the largest taxpayers in lower Manhattan, and the names of Arthur Kingsley Porter and his brother Louis are listed in the table. The piece revealed that Louis Hopkins Porter had paid more taxes in 1923 than the estate of John Jacob Astor IV, some Rockefeller family members, and the same amount as William Randolph Hearst.

He married Lucy Bryant Wallace in 1912 in New York City. She acted as chief photographer for the pair from 1919 onward. They eventually traveled for long stays in Italy, Greece and Spain, and finally to Ireland.

== Disappearance ==
Porter disappeared at age 50, in July 1933. He was outside during a storm on Inishbofin Island, near Glenveagh Castle, his home in Ireland, and was presumed drowned. His wife later told the coroner of her six-hour search with two local fishermen. The inquest concluded that he had probably died from misadventure.

== Notable relatives ==
- Cousin Noah Porter, Academic, author, and the 11th President of Yale College from 1871 to 1886.
- Uncle Schuyler Merritt, Republican member of the United States House of Representatives representing Connecticut's 4th district for a combined 17 years. Merritt is also the namesake of the Connecticut parkway that bears his name.
  - Merritt acted as a surrogate father to A. Kingsley Porter in Kingsley's father's later years
  - Merritt was a mentor to Porter's niece, Joyce Porter Arneill, a political activist and philanthropist
- Uncle Frederick Maxfield Hoyt, yacht designer, naval architect and sailor. Hoyt was a member of the New York Yacht Club, and navigator on the sailing yacht Atlantic when she won the 1905 Kaiser's Cup race, setting a transatlantic sailing record that would stand for 100 years. Hoyt was also a first-class passenger on the RMS Titanic in 1912. After placing his wife in Collapsible Lifeboat D, he ascended to the bridge to have a drink with his friend, Titanic Captain Edward Smith, before jumping into the water himself and being rescued.
- Niece Joyce Porter Arneill, political activist and philanthropist, daughter of Porter's brother Louis Hopkins Porter. At 30 years old, Arneill was founder and first president of the National Federation of Republican Women, the women's wing of the Republican Party in the United States. At age 31, Arneill was a delegate to the Republican national convention before the 1940 presidential election.

== Yale and Harvard professorships ==
Porter taught as a lecturer at Yale University in 1915, and was named assistant professor in the History of Art in 1917. In January 1916, he proposed giving the university $500,000 ($12 million in 2017 dollars) in order to establish a department of art history. Porter laid out the very specific purposes for which the money was to be used

[t]o provide salaries for professors or instructors in the history of art in the academic department, as might be required. To provide for the running and overhead expenses of such a department, the purchases of equipment, slides, photographs, books, etc. Any residue to be used for the purchase of additional works of art to add to the collection of the Art School, and for the proper maintenance and housing of the same.

The university declined the offer, which could only be used for the purposes he set out.

Porter became frustrated at Yale's lack of openness to having a full department dedicated to the study of the history of art and architecture. In 1918 he left Yale to lead architectural preservation efforts by the French government caused by war damage, as the only foreigner invited to join said commission.

Porter began teaching at Harvard University in 1921. He and his wife bought Cambridge mansion Elmwood that same year. He was appointed to the newly established William Dorr Boardman Memorial Professorship of Fine Arts in January 1925. In 1923 and 1924 he taught as an exchange professor in France and visiting professor Spain. Porter taught at Harvard until his disappearance in 1933.

Porter left Elmwood to Harvard University in his will, as well as a trust for its maintenance. His widow, Lucy, left the university an additional $1,000,000 in her will ($9 million in 2017 dollars) to endow a chair to be called the A Kingsley Porter Chair Professorship. The medievalist Ernst Kitzinger was appointed in 1967 as the chair's first professor.

== Indiana Jones persona and the Sahagún sarcophagus ==
Porter was given the nickname a ‘real-life Indiana Jones’. He was unique in the academic community, given he was a multimillionaire in his own right, with his own European castle, and the means to travel extensively, often for more than a year at a time.

Sarcophagus curse

While his overall station and manner of teaching, exploring, researching and writing certainly fit this "Indiana Jones" profile, perhaps nothing made this a more fitting comparison than the incident with the sarcophagus commissioned by Count Pedro Ansùrez in 1093 for his young son Alfonso.

Porter came into possession of the sarcophagus, and took it to Harvard as a gift to the university's Fogg Museum, where it was prominently displayed. The sarcophagus enabled Porter to prove his theory on the spread of Romanesque sculpture:

The lid of the sarcophagus was considered to be one of the finest examples of European sepulchral sculpture in existence from the Middle Ages. The discovery of the burial slab gave Kingsley the proof he had been searching for that Romanesque sculpture was practiced in Spain during the eleventh century. The sculptured style of decoration on the coffin lid was a divergence from tomb construction of the time. It contained large figures representing souls that had passed into the other world, Evangelists and Archangels, all in human form. The figures were depicted with large bulging eyes and the archangel Gabriel had long chiselled curls. Therefore, as an art object it was invaluable to archaeologists to further their knowledge of eleventh-century Romanesque Spanish sculpture.

In 1931, Jacobo Fitz-James Stuart, the 17th Duke of Alba, discovered the sarcophagus had been removed from Lèon and brought to Harvard by Porter. The Spanish government became involved with the negotiations with Harvard, but before any deal was reached, Alfonso XIII of Spain was overthrown by a revolution, and so the slab remained on display at Harvard in 1931. Negotiations resumed in 1933, and Porter consented for the sarcophagus lid to be returned to Léon on 8 July 1933.

For those who insisted on a supernatural explanation for Kingsley's demise, then his disturbance of the tomb at Sahagún in 1926…and his mysterious disappearance would have been fodder for their belief in a medieval curse that had been unleashed on the unwary archaeologist. There was still one fact to emerge, involving the infamous sarcophagus slab, that was certainly uncanny: The sarcophagus lid that had enclosed the tomb of Alfonso Ansúrez in 1093 was finally returned to its rightful place on 8 July 1933 – the day of Kingsley's disappearance.

== Residences ==
- Blachley Lodge, on Noroton Hill, Darien, CT, where Porter was born
- Elmwood
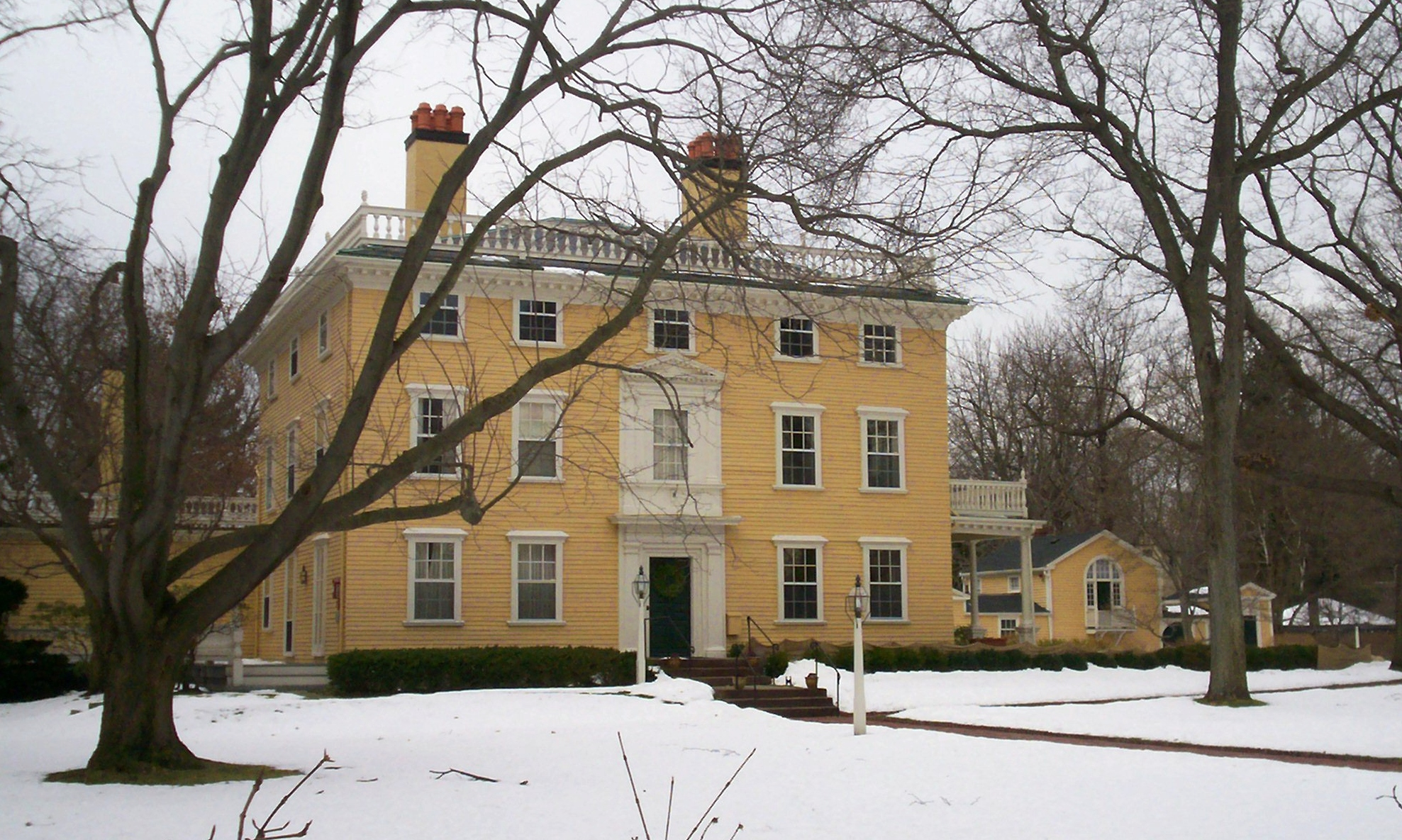
  Elmwood, Cambridge, MA
  - Porter's Cambridge Mansion, Elmwood, had been previously occupied by Elbridge Gerry, a signer of the US Declaration of Independence and Vice President of the United States under President James Madison. Poet James Russell Lowell was born at Elmwood and lived there most of his life. Lowell's friend Henry Wadsworth Longfellow wrote a poem about the house entitled “The Herons of Elmwood”
  - Porter purchased Elmwood from Lowell's heirs in 1920, and put significant resources into improving it while honoring the home's history.
  - Porter often held class at Elmwood and allowed students to see relics from his travels.
  - Elmwood became the official residence of Harvard University's president in 1970, and remains so today.
- Glenveagh Castle, Ireland
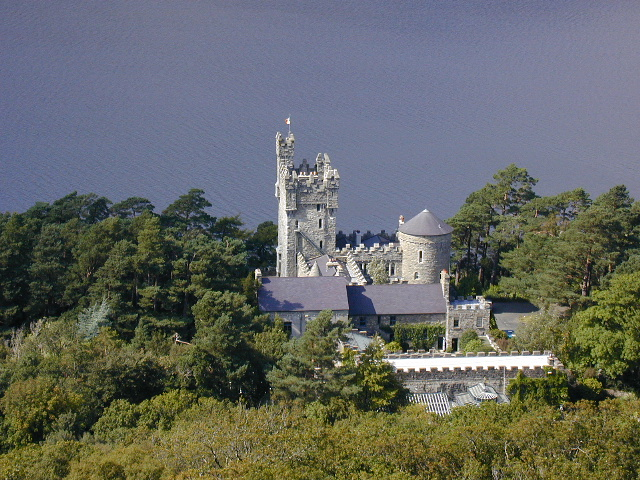
  Glenveagh Castle (Courtesy of Wikimedia Commons)
  - Porter purchased Glenveagh Castle and its surrounding 30,000 acres in 1929. He further restored a fisherman's cottage on nearby Inishboffin Island. In 1937, Lucy Porter sold the property to Henry Plumer McHilhenny, one of Porter's former students from Harvard. It briefly became a retreat for Hollywood stars such as Greta Garbo and Charlie Chaplin.

== Achievements and selected works ==
Porter wrote 293 works that were published in 934 publications, in seven languages, with 7,452 library holdings. Porter's photographic collection contains 35,000 photographs and 11,700 negatives, pertaining to every aspect of medieval art. Photographs taken by Porter are held in the Conway Library of art and architecture at The Courtauld Institute in London. The Department of Image Collections at the National Gallery of Art Library in Washington, D.C. holds approximately 3,200 photographs of art and architecture taken by the Porters as well as an additional 6,400 photographs from Kingsley Porter's teaching and research collection.

- Medieval Architecture: Its Origins and Development, with Lists of Monuments and Bibliographies (2 volumes, Baker & Taylor, 1909)
- The Construction of Lombard and Gothic Vaults (New Haven: Yale University Press, 1911)
- Lombard Architecture (4 volumes, 1915–1919)
- The Seven Who Slept (Boston: Marshall Jones Company, 1919)
- Romanesque Sculpture of the Pilgrimage Roads (10 vol., 1923) – "his most well known and contentious work"
- Spanish Romanesque Sculpture (2 volumes, 1928), based on lectures at the Sorbonne.
- The Crosses and Culture of Ireland (New Haven: Yale University Press, 1931), based on five lectures delivered at the Metropolitan Museum of Art in February and March 1930.
