= Mary Jo Tiampo =

American freestyle skier

Personal information
- Nationality: American
- Born: 1962 (age 63–64)

Sport
- Country: United States
- Sport: Freestyle skiing
Medal record
Women's freestyle skiing
Representing United States
World Championships
Gold medal – first place	1986 Tignes	Moguls

Mary Jo Tiampo (born 1962) is an American freestyle skier and world champion.

She won a gold medal in moguls at the FIS Freestyle World Ski Championships 1986 in Tignes.
